= Erechim =

Municipality of Rio Grande do Sul, Brazil

- Municipality
- The Municipality of Erechim
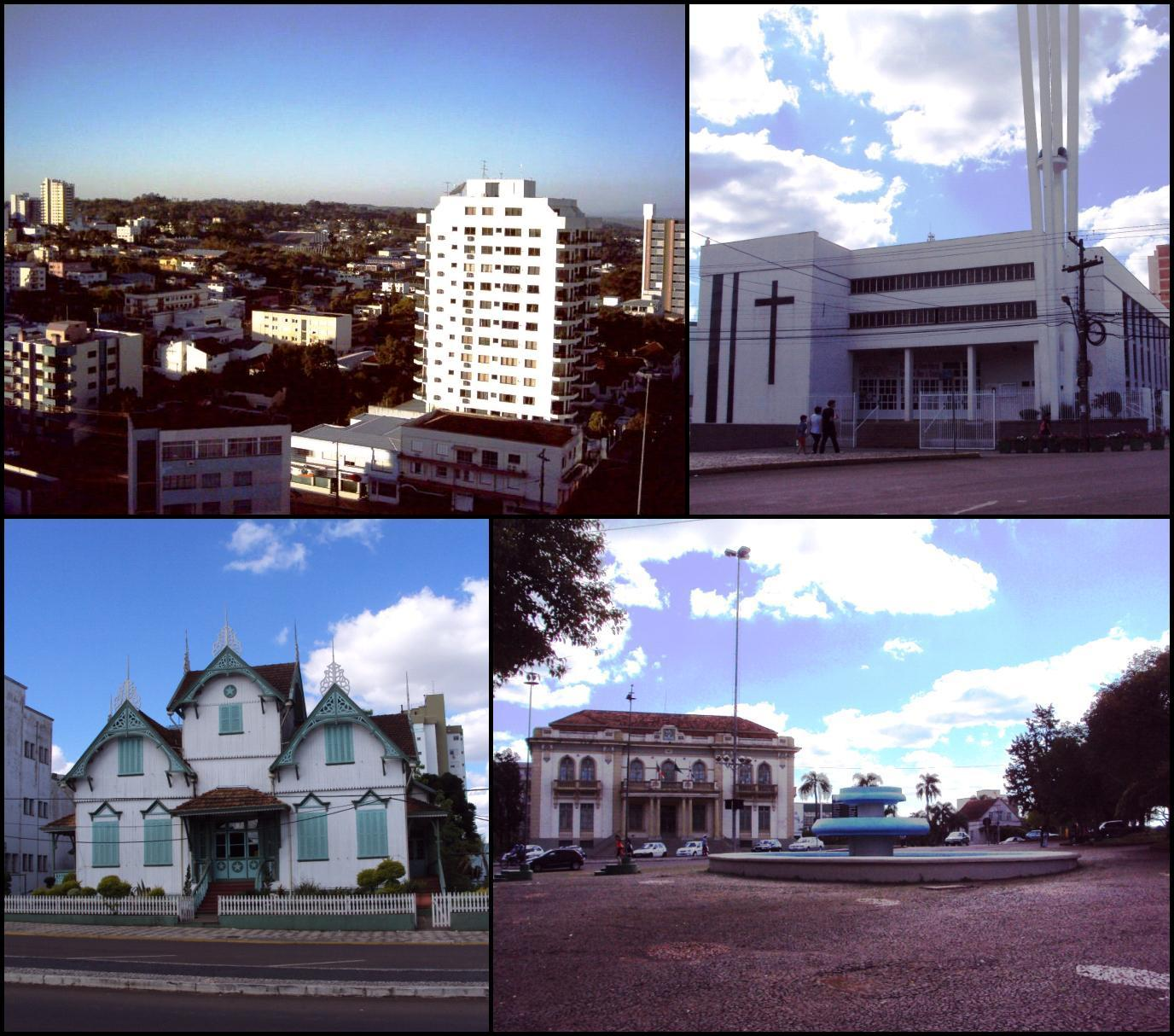
- Top left:View of downtown Aratiba area, Top right:Erechin Cathedral, Bottom left:Castelinho native house in Alemanda street, Bottom right:A fountain in Bandeira Square, near Tiradentes Avenue

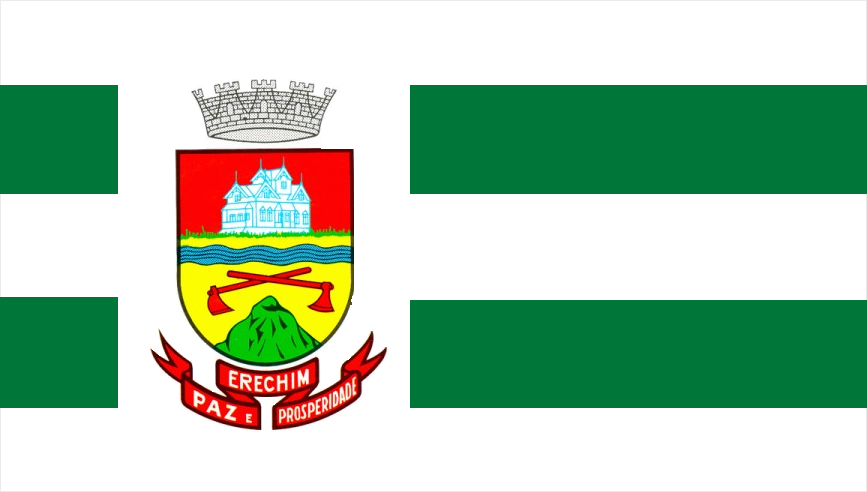
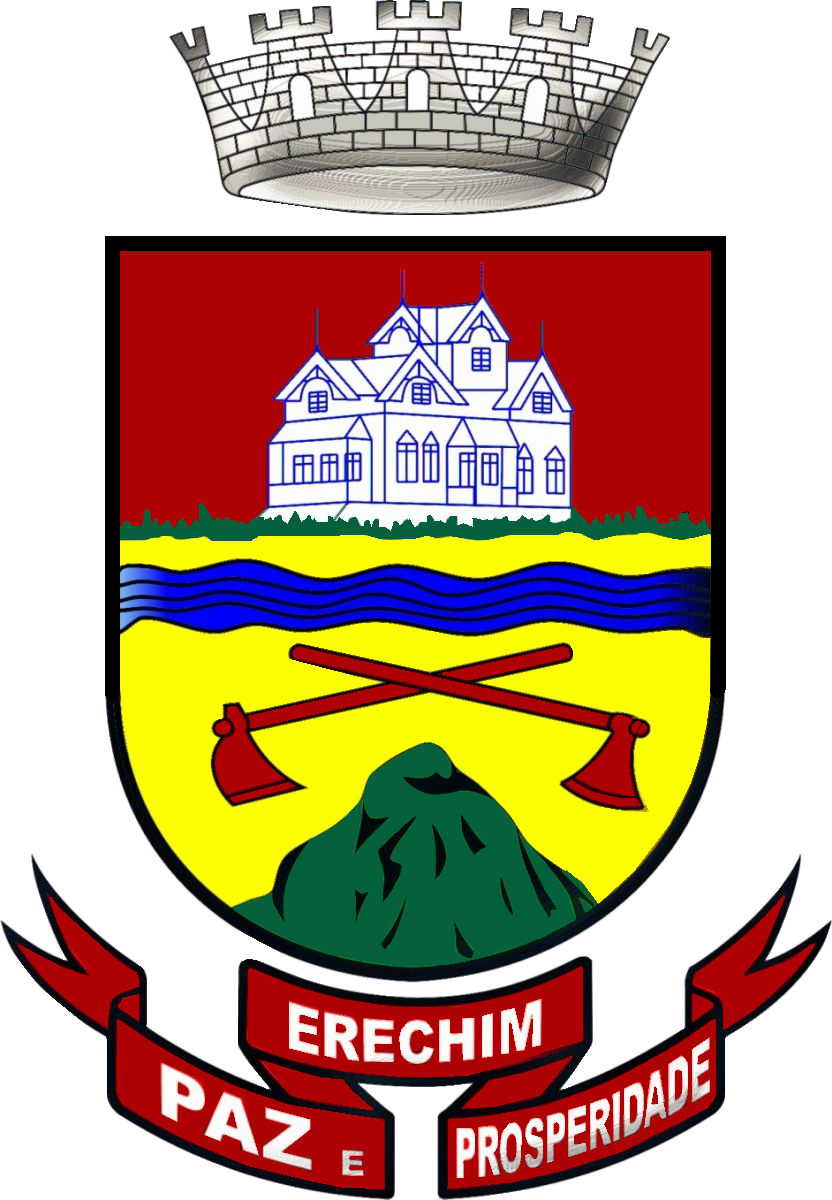
- Flag Coat of arms
- Nickname: Flower city
- Location of Erechim

- Location in Brazil
- Coordinates: 27°38′02″S 52°16′26″W
- Country: Brazil
- Region: South
- State: Rio Grande do Sul
- Founded: April 30, 1918

Government
  - Mayor: Paulo Pólis (MDB)

Area
  - Total: 429.164 km^{2} (165.701 sq mi)
- Elevation: 783 m (2,569 ft)

Population (2022 Census)
  - Total: 105,705
  - Estimate (2025): 109,609
  - Rank: RS: 19th BR: 301st
  - Density: 246.304/km^{2} (637.926/sq mi)
- Time zone: UTC-3 (BRT)
- Postal code: 99700-000 to 99714-999
- HDI (2010): 0.776 – high
- HDI rank: RS: 23rd BR: 168th
- GDP (2020): R$5,859,841,940
- GDP rank: RS: 14th BR: 203rd
- GDP per capita (2020): R$54,953.36
- Website: www.erechim.rs.gov.br

Erechim (Portuguese pronunciation: [eɾe'ʃi᷉]) is a municipality in the state of Rio Grande do Sul, located in the South Region of Brazil. Recognized as a subregional hub in the country, it serves as the central city of the Alto Uruguai region in Rio Grande do Sul and is the second most populous city in the northern part of the state, with an estimated population of 105,705 inhabitants in 2022 Census, according to the IBGE. According to the Socioeconomic Development Index (IDESE), Erechim ranks as the second most developed city in Rio Grande do Sul among municipalities with over 100,000 inhabitants, leading in the education sector. The Atlas of Violence identifies it as the second safest municipality in the state. In 2015, Erechim held the 15th position in GDP among municipalities in Rio Grande do Sul.

Erechim is one of Brazil’s earliest planned modern cities. Its urban layout drew inspiration from urban planning concepts used in Washington, D.C. (1791), Paris (1850), Buenos Aires (1580), and Belo Horizonte (1897). However, recent modifications to its road network have enhanced traffic flow, characterized by wide streets, a clear hierarchy, and the creation of convergence points through diagonal streets intersecting the basic grid. Key elements of its urban design include a perpendicular street grid intersected by diagonal avenues, uniformly sized city blocks, and a perimeter avenue encircling the city.

== Etymology ==
When Erechim was established as a municipality on April 30, 1918, it was named "Erexim," a term derived from the Kaingang language, meaning "small field," formed by combining rê or erê ("field") and xim ("small"). The city's name likely reflects the forests that surrounded it at the time. The city has also been known by other names, such as Paiol Grande, Boa Vista, Boa Vista de Erechim, and José Bonifácio, but "Erechim" has endured to the present day.

According to the orthographic rules of the Portuguese language established in the Orthographic Agreement of 1943, the toponym should be spelled "Erexim," since the letter "x" is used for words of Kaingang origin. However, the municipality’s name is officially registered with "ch," as seen in all traffic signs, vehicle plates, and official documents.

During the celebrations marking Erechim’s 50th anniversary in 1968, Rubem Safro, popularly known as Buja, referred to the city as the "Capital of Friendship" while hosting a local event. This nickname was soon embraced by the municipality, reflecting the harmonious coexistence of its diverse ethnic communities.

== History ==
=== Origins ===
Studies conducted by Eletrosul indicate that the Alto Uruguai region, where Erechim is located, has been inhabited by humans for at least 10,000 years. Over the past three centuries, the area was primarily home to indigenous Kaingang peoples, with some Guarani groups occupying lower-altitude regions.

The first non-indigenous settlers in the area now comprising Erechim were likely Paulista descendants of bandeirantes, who settled sporadically after receiving land grants from the state government. Their initial occupation was marked by violent conflicts with the Kaingang, whom the Portuguese referred to as "coroados."

These early settlers established themselves in a forested region intersected by the abundant river network of the western Pelotas-Uruguay basin. Around 1887, Augusto de Oliveira Penteado, known as Augusto César, along with João Placidino Machado and Antônio Ferreira de Albuquerque, conducted a river exploration. They submitted a detailed report to the Passo Fundo Municipal Council in late 1888, naming various geographical features.

In 1908, the Erechim Colony was founded, planned by the Director of Lands and Colonization, Carlos Torres Gonçalves, following positivist principles to serve as a model for colonization. The colony experienced rapid economic growth, facilitated by the presence of a railway and well-planned roads constructed according to the colony’s original design. The colony was officially established in 1910 with the arrival of the first 36 settlers: four families totaling 28 individuals and four single persons.

=== Pioneerism and Immigration ===
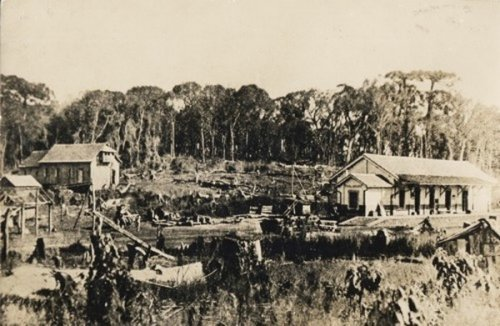
The Erechim railway station in 1910

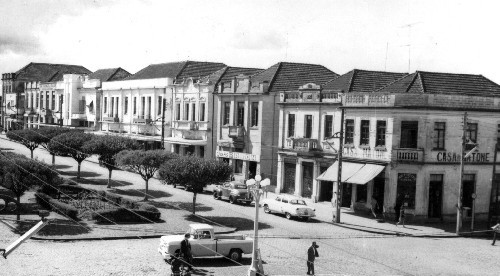
Maurício Cardoso Avenue

The region was primarily colonized by immigrants of Polish (1918), German (1912), Jewish (1911), and predominantly Italian descent. The first Italian families arrived around 1910 via the railway, significantly shaping the region’s social, cultural, and material character over the years. Many immigrants, particularly Italians, sought better lives for themselves and future generations. Their influence remains evident today, especially in the city’s architecture and cuisine.

By 1910, under the influence of these early immigrants, the colony’s seat had already developed an urban character, with streets laid out and approximately 50 wooden houses constructed, alongside 22 more under construction. The settlement included two lodging barracks for immigrants, an infirmary, a materials warehouse, nine commercial establishments, a barber shop, a tailor shop, three shoe shops, and a butcher shop. The rural area also developed rapidly. By 1914, the initial settlement of the Erechim Colony had become the most prosperous village in the region. On April 20, 1916, the Land and Colonization Commission’s office was relocated from the Erechim settlement to Paiol Grande, the previously designated general headquarters of the colony.

=== Administrative formation ===
With the growth of the settlement and its economy—driven by agriculture, livestock, commerce, and services—Erechim was elevated to municipality status under state decree No. 2342 on April 30, 1918, signed by Borges de Medeiros, separating it from the municipality of Passo Fundo. Its seat was established in the former settlement of Boa Vista do Erechim, officially established on June 18, 1918. Over the years, new districts were added. In the 1920 national census, the municipality was divided into five districts: Boa Vista do Erechim (seat), Erechim, Barro, Erebango, and Marcelino Ramos. By December 31, 1937, it included eleven districts: Erechim, Barro, Marcelino Ramos, Nova Itália, Nova Polônia, Paulo Bento, Quatro Irmãos, Rio Novo, São Valentim, Treze de Maio, and Viadutos. In 1943, the municipality consisted of twelve districts: José Bonifácio (formerly Erechim), Barro, Carlos Gomes (formerly Ribeirão do Torto, previously Nova Polônia), Cotegipe, Marcelino Ramos, Nova Itália, Paulo Bento, Princesa Isabel (formerly Treze de Maio), Quatro Irmãos, Rio Novo, São Valentim, Severiano Almeida (formerly Nova Itália), and Viadutos. By December 1, 1960, it comprised nine districts: Erechim, Barão de Cotegipe, Capo-Erê, Itatiba, Mariano Moro, Nova Itália (formerly Severiano de Almeida), Paulo Bento, Quatro Irmãos, and Três Arroios. The last modification, under state law No. 10762 of April 16, 1996, separated the districts of Paulo Bento and Quatro Irmãos, which became independent municipalities. Erechim then consisted of three districts: Capo-Êre, Jaguaretê, and the seat.

=== Urban growth ===
Following the completion of official procedures for emancipation, the Secretary of Public Works, Carlos Torres Gonçalves, ordered the planning of the city that would serve as the municipality’s seat. Engineers and surveyors from the land commission, based in the former Erechim settlement (now Getúlio Vargas), began their work using the railway station as the starting point, apparently without prior terrain reconnaissance. The urban plan mirrored that of Belo Horizonte, the capital of Minas Gerais, and incorporated urban planning concepts from Washington, D.C. (1791) and Paris (1850). Once the layout was approved, the city’s development commenced with the sale of plots and rapid construction of wooden buildings, particularly along José Bonifácio Avenue, now known as Maurício Cardoso. Thus, Vila Boa Vista emerged, replacing the former Paiol Grande.

Over time, urban improvements became necessary. Key projects included leveling the gully along Maurício Cardoso Avenue, channeling streams in the initial blocks of Itália Street and Nelson Ehlers Street, and filling numerous potholes with wood and dirt.

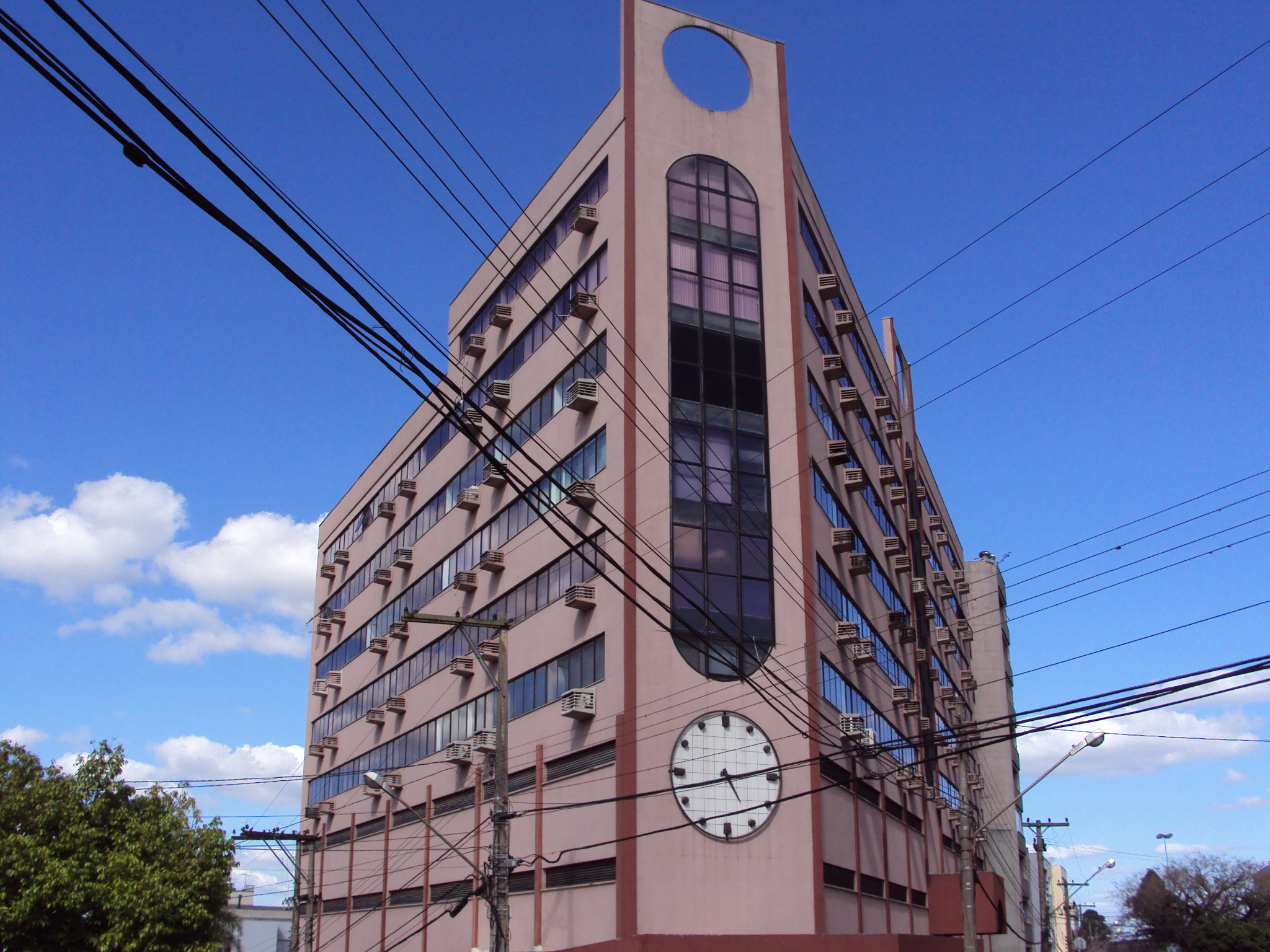
Financial center in the city center, the Clock Building

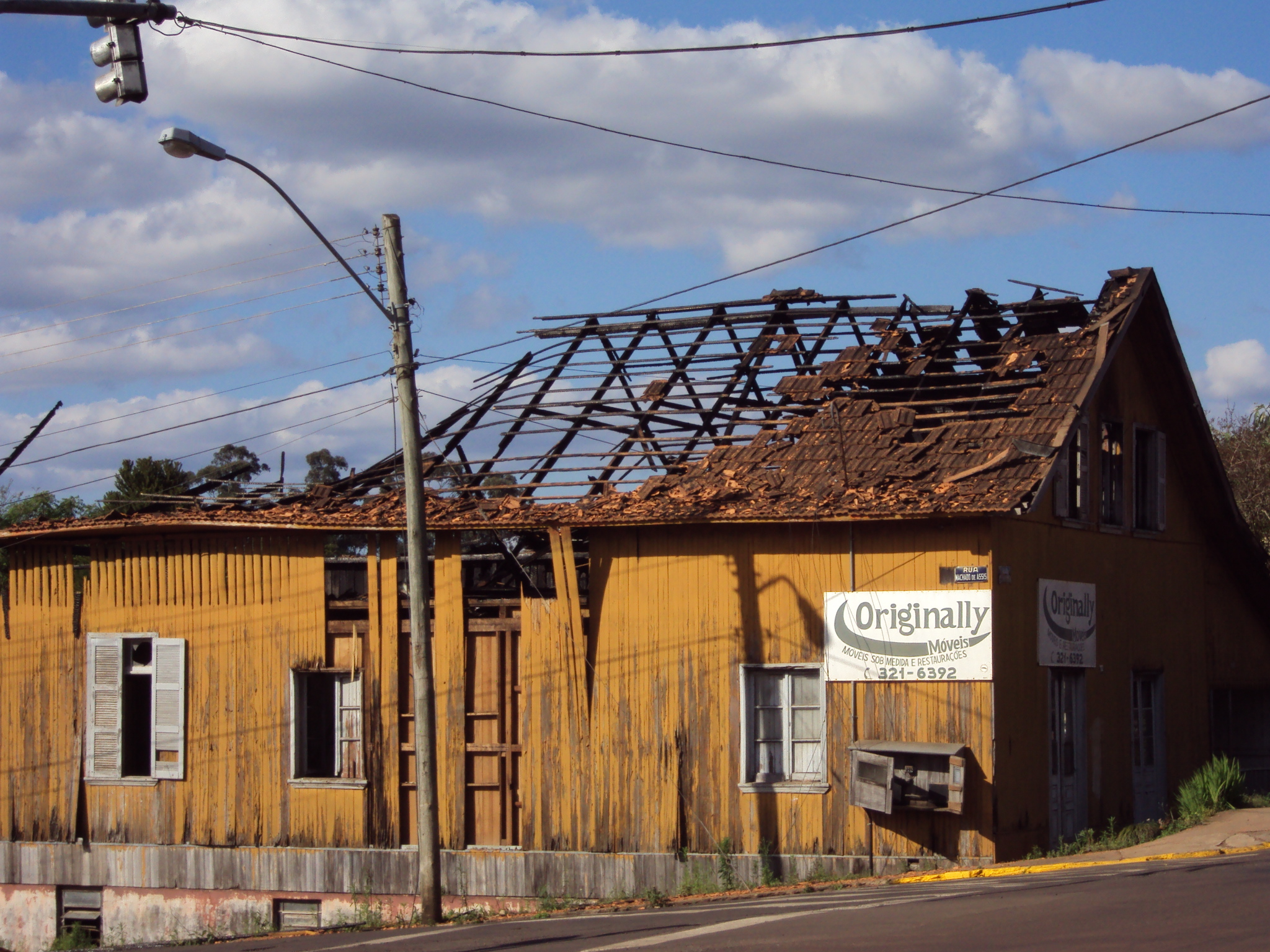
One of the houses built in the 1930s in Erechim, destroyed by a fire in 2010.

Later, extensive studies revealed that Erechim was built over uneven terrain. A months-long topographic survey, led by Diumer Schneider, the Malinowski brothers, the Losina brothers, Antônio Bergmann, and Henrique Schwerin, mapped the area at two-meter intervals. Before this survey was completed, the mayor ordered the municipal surveyor to level the pavement, resulting in curbs that reflected the terrain’s imperfections. Numerous administrations unsuccessfully attempted to level the city. Subsequently, a Master Plan was developed to guide urban development. This plan prioritized leveling buildings before streets, leading to structures with multiple floors partially below ground after street leveling to mitigate steep inclines. The Master Plan sparked significant controversy and was ultimately shelved.

=== Recent history ===
With the growth of Erechim and neighboring cities, the Erechim Microregion was established, encompassing Erechim and 30 other municipalities. The most populous include Getúlio Vargas, Aratiba, Barão de Cotegipe, Estação, Gaurama, Campinas do Sul, Erval Grande, Marcelino Ramos, Viadutos, Itatiba do Sul, Áurea, and Severiano de Almeida. In 2006, IBGE estimated the microregion’s population at approximately 211,228 inhabitants across a total area of 5,745 km². Its average HDI was 0.791, with an average per capita GDP of R$22,048 in 2003. The microregion is part of the Noroeste Rio-Grandense mesoregion.

One of the most tragic incidents in Erechim’s history occurred on September 22, 2004, when a bus chartered by the municipality to transport rural students to city schools, carrying 31 passengers, fell into a CORSAN dam. It took rescue teams over three hours to pull the bus out of the water. The parents of the deceased teenagers were compensated with R$190,000. The driver, who sustained minor injuries, was arrested in 2005 for speeding. Autopsies confirmed that 17 children and teenagers died. Lucas Verazzo, a student, died heroically saving three classmates from drowning before losing his life in an attempt to save a fourth. The three days following the accident were marked by protests, with classes suspended across all city schools.

== Geography ==
Erechim is situated in the Alto Uruguai region, located between the Uruguay River and the Ijuí River, with numerous small and medium-sized streams forming sub-basins that shape its landscape. The municipality has an average elevation of 783 meters. It borders the municipalities of Aratiba and Três Arroios to the north; Getúlio Vargas and Erebango to the south; Gaurama and Áurea to the east; and Paulo Bento and Barão de Cotegipe to the west. Erechim is approximately 370 km from the state capital, Porto Alegre, with a road distance of about 330 km. The region is characterized by basalt as its geological foundation, forming a deeply dissected plain shaped by tributaries of the Uruguay River.

The municipality covers an area of 430.764 km², accounting for 0.1602% of Rio Grande do Sul’s territory, 0.0764% of the South Region, and 0.0051% of Brazil’s total area. The urban perimeter spans 14.2925 km². Erechim is part of the Noroeste Rio-Grandense mesoregion, within division 004, which includes municipalities formerly part of the Erechim Microregion, a designation replaced by IBGE in 2017. This new division also places Erechim within the Passo Fundo Intermediate Geographic Region.

=== Climate ===
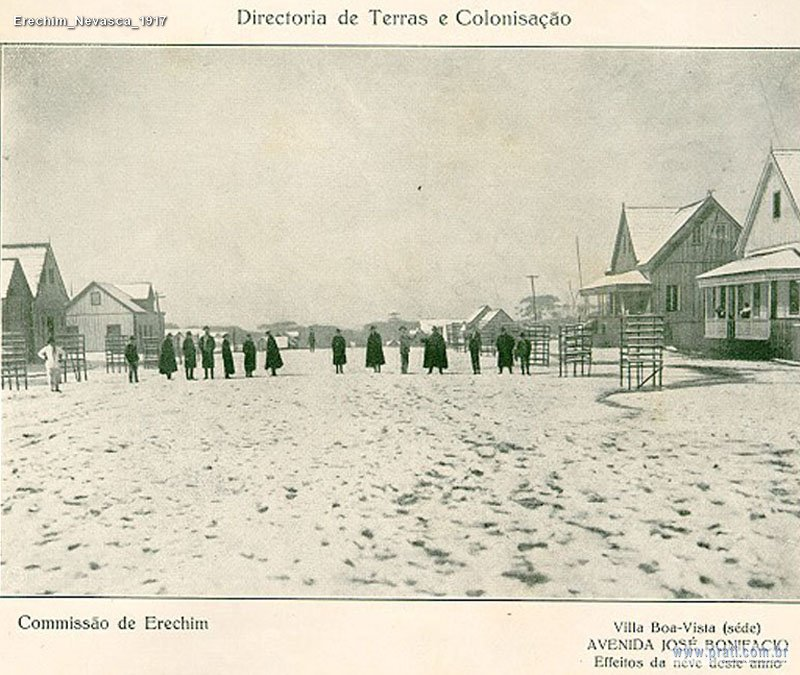
Records of snow in Erechim in 1917

Erechim’s climate is classified as humid subtropical (Cfa according to the Köppen classification), falling within climate zone C. The city experiences regular rainfall throughout the year, with an average annual temperature of approximately 18. Winters are cold, though rarely extreme, and summers have moderate temperatures. During winter, polar air masses can lower temperatures below zero, often leading to frost. Autumn and spring serve as transitional seasons. The annual rainfall exceeds 1,800 millimeters (mm). Prolonged dry spells, or Indian summers, often result in smoke from wildfires in hills and rural areas. While rare, snow has been recorded in Erechim in 1918, 1942, 1956, 1957, 1965, 1990, and 2001.

Data from the automatic weather station operated by the National Institute of Meteorology (INMET) in Erechim, active since November 2006, recorded the lowest temperature of −3.8 on July 18, 2017, and the highest of 35.6 on December 29, 2019. The highest 24-hour precipitation accumulation reached 111.2 on October 4, 2023.

Climate data for Erechim (1976–2005 normals, extremes 2006–present)
Month	Jan	Feb	Mar	Apr	May	Jun	Jul	Aug	Sep	Oct	Nov	Dec	Year
Record high °C (°F)	35.1 (95.2)	34.8 (94.6)	35.0 (95.0)	32.4 (90.3)	29.1 (84.4)	26.4 (79.5)	26.6 (79.9)	30.6 (87.1)	33.4 (92.1)	34.6 (94.3)	33.4 (92.1)	35.6 (96.1)	35.6 (96.1)
Mean daily maximum °C (°F)	27.9 (82.2)	27.2 (81.0)	26.4 (79.5)	23.5 (74.3)	20.5 (68.9)	18.3 (64.9)	18.2 (64.8)	20.0 (68.0)	20.9 (69.6)	23.5 (74.3)	25.7 (78.3)	27.2 (81.0)	23.3 (73.9)
Daily mean °C (°F)	22.6 (72.7)	22.1 (71.8)	21.2 (70.2)	18.5 (65.3)	15.7 (60.3)	13.9 (57.0)	13.5 (56.3)	15.0 (59.0)	15.7 (60.3)	18.2 (64.8)	20.0 (68.0)	21.7 (71.1)	18.2 (64.8)
Mean daily minimum °C (°F)	17.3 (63.1)	17.0 (62.6)	16.1 (61.0)	13.5 (56.3)	10.9 (51.6)	9.5 (49.1)	8.9 (48.0)	9.9 (49.8)	10.6 (51.1)	12.9 (55.2)	14.3 (57.7)	16.3 (61.3)	13.1 (55.6)
Record low °C (°F)	9.3 (48.7)	9.0 (48.2)	3.4 (38.1)	1.2 (34.2)	−1.4 (29.5)	−3.1 (26.4)	−3.8 (25.2)	−1.0 (30.2)	−0.4 (31.3)	4.7 (40.5)	3.3 (37.9)	7.0 (44.6)	−3.8 (25.2)
Average precipitation mm (inches)	159.3 (6.27)	134.0 (5.28)	121.3 (4.78)	110.5 (4.35)	116.9 (4.60)	152.8 (6.02)	106.5 (4.19)	164.2 (6.46)	193.3 (7.61)	178.3 (7.02)	141.0 (5.55)	159.5 (6.28)	1,737.5 (68.41)
Average relative humidity (%)	78	79	80	79	83	82	81	79	76	76	75	76	79
Mean monthly sunshine hours	239	207	211	190	184	157	170	185	178	208	226	244	2,399
Source 1: EMBRAPA/FEPAGRO
Source 2: INMET (temperature records: 25/11/2006–present)

=== Ecology and environment ===
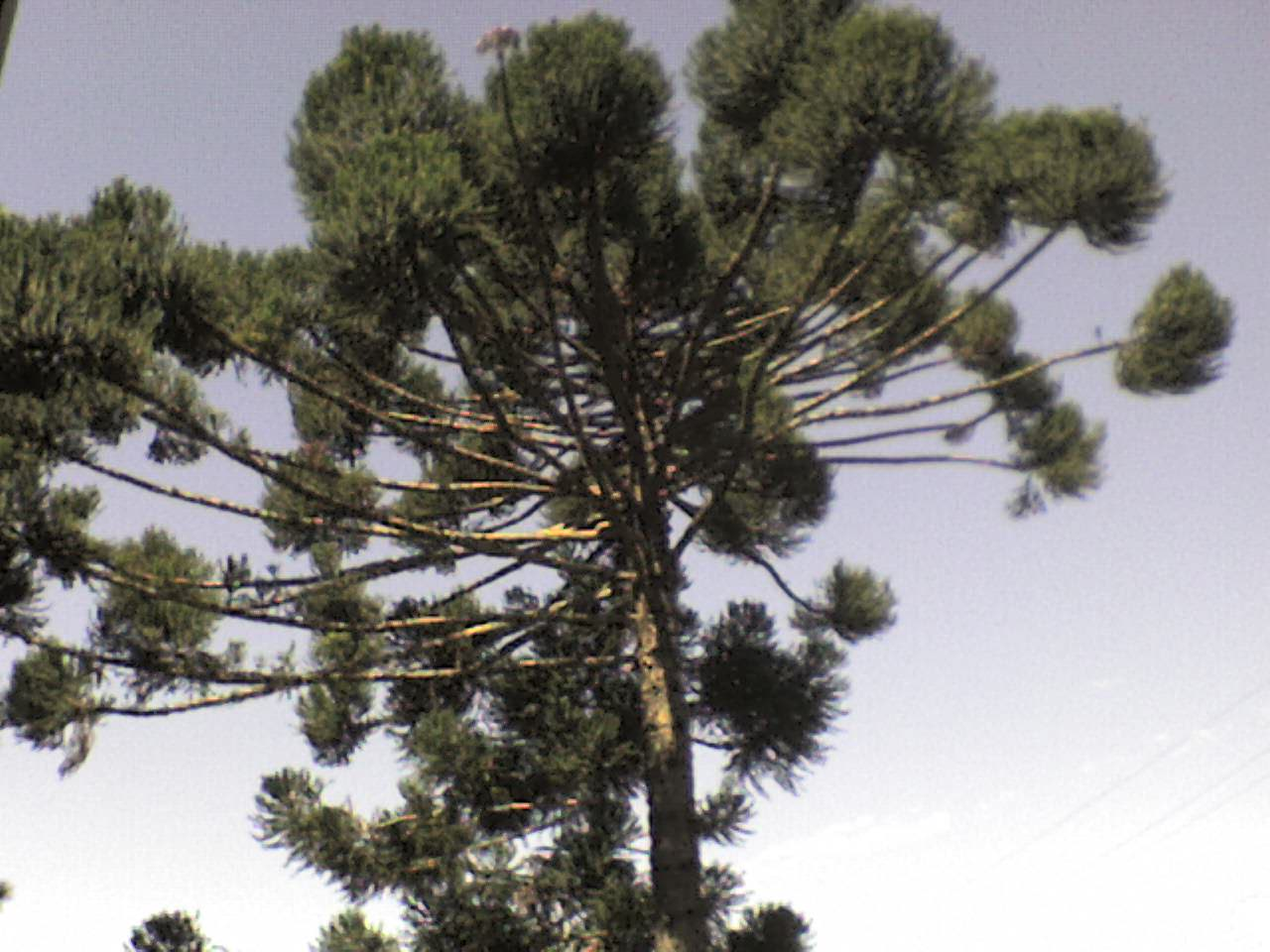
Brazilian pine, which is typical of the temperate regions of the Rio Grande do Sul Plateau, is abundant in the city.

The vegetation of Erechim comprises a mix of the Araucaria moist forests, or mixed ombrophilous forest, and prairies. The Brazilian pine is one of the city’s most common trees, characteristic of the colder regions of the Rio Grande do Sul Plateau. Recently, the municipal government planted Brazilian pine saplings in Longines Malinowski Park, distributing approximately 1,300 saplings from the municipal forest nursery. During Environment Week, activities included trail walks, visits to the sanitary landfill and springs, workshops, artistic performances, and exhibitions, engaging around 1,000 participants.

The municipality faces pollution challenges due to the growing municipal vehicle fleet. The Secretariats of Culture, Sports, and Tourism, and Environment organized the Erechim City Cycling Event Against Pollution, held in observance of Anti-Pollution Day.

According to the municipal government, environmental licensing is a key component of environmental management, guiding the location, installation, expansion, and operation of potentially polluting enterprises or activities that may cause environmental harm. Environmental licenses in Erechim are issued by the Municipal Secretariat of Environment (SMMA), based on Municipal Law No. 3932 of December 2005, in accordance with State Environmental Council resolutions 102/2005 and 16/2001, and proposals by the Municipal Environmental Protection Council (COMPAM).

== Demography ==
Population growth of Erechim
Year	Population
1970	48,677
1980	61,115
1991	72,318
2000	90,347
2006	100,251
2010	96,105
2013	101,122
2020	106,633

In 2020, Erechim’s population was estimated at 106,633 inhabitants, making it the 19th most populous municipality in the state, with a population density of 223.11 inhabitants per km². According to the 2000 census, 48.22% of the population were men (43,568 inhabitants) and 51.78% were women (46,779 inhabitants), aligning with the demographic pattern of Rio Grande do Sul. The age structure shows limited participation of youth and elderly, with adults comprising 65.9% of the population. Approximately 90.79% (82,026 inhabitants) lived in the urban area, while 9.21% (14,761 inhabitants) resided in the rural area. In 2020, Erechim had an estimated 79,288 eligible voters.

Erechim’s Human Development Index (HDI-M) is considered high by the United Nations Development Programme (UNDP), with a value of 0.776 in 2010. In 2007, the longevity index was 0.833, the health index was 0.782, and the education index was 0.716. In 2000, the population consisted of 78,056 Whites (86.40%), 9,983 mixed-race individuals (11.05%), 2,028 Blacks (2.24%), 132 Indigenous people (0.15%), 55 Asians (0.06%), and 93 individuals with no declared race (0.10%).

=== Religion ===
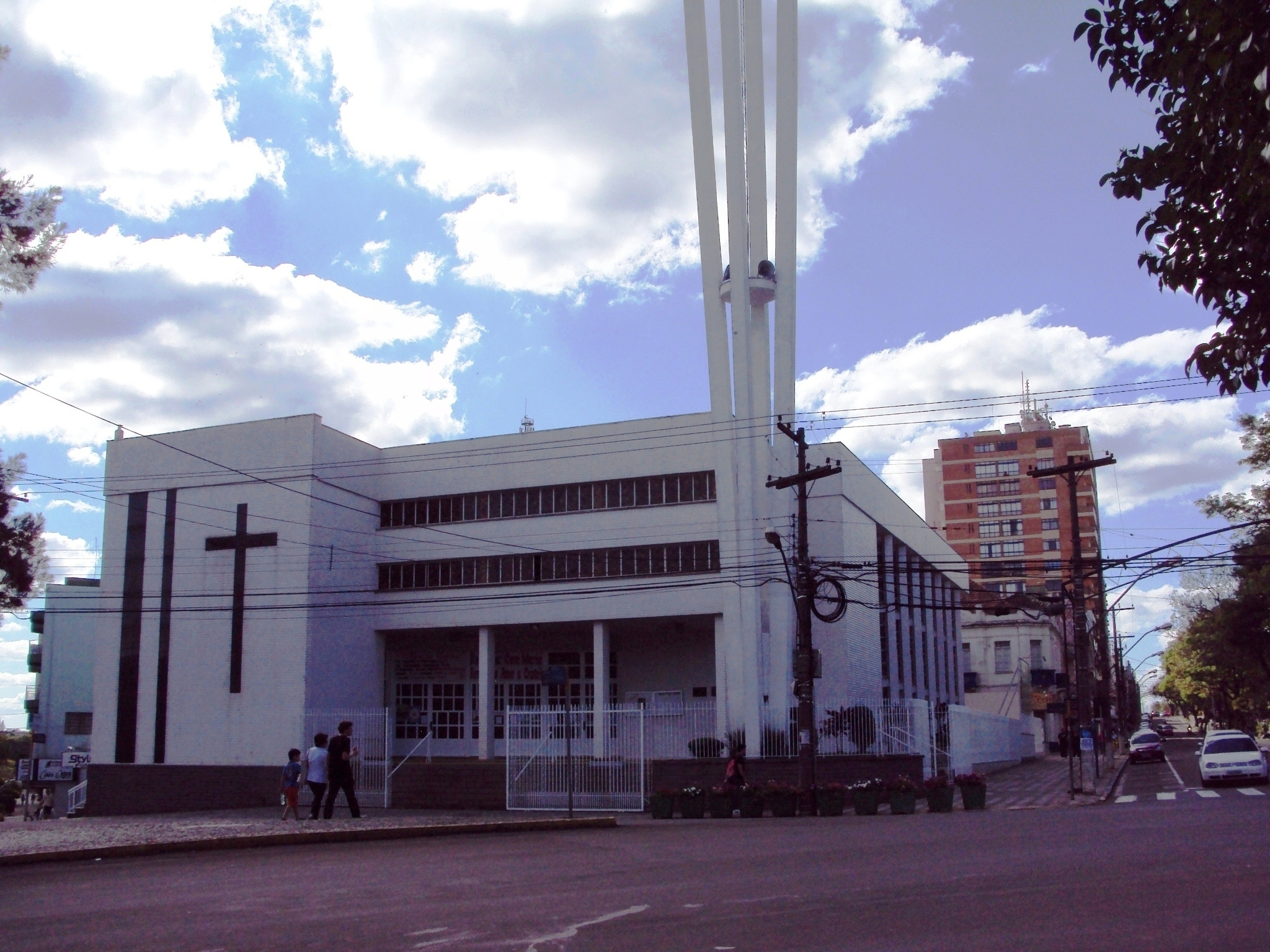
The Erechim Cathedral, the main gathering place for Catholics in the city

Reflecting Erechim’s cultural diversity, the city hosts a variety of religious practices. While it developed within a predominantly Catholic social framework, numerous Protestant denominations are now present. The growth of evangelicals has been notable, comprising nearly 11.4% of the population.

The Jewish community in Erechim is significant relative to the state, consisting of many professionals and entrepreneurs, with members excelling in cultural, artistic, and academic fields. It is estimated that Jews in the interior of Rio Grande do Sul account for 10% of the state’s Jewish population.

The city of Erechim is located in the country with the largest Catholic population in the world. In October 2009, the federal government recognized the legal status of the Catholic Church, though Brazil is officially a secular state. The city is home to various Protestant denominations, including the Assembly of God. According to the 2000 census by the IBGE, Erechim’s population is composed of Catholics (85.76%), evangelicals (11.32%), non-religious individuals (0.90%), Spiritists (0.71%), and 1.31% adhering to other religions.

== Politics and justice ==
The city’s first governor was Intendant Ayres Pires de Oliveira, appointed on June 18, 1918. Following Decree No. 4,666, Erechim’s first mayor was Amintas Maciel, appointed on December 9, 1930. One of the city’s major avenues is named in his honor. Over 27 terms, 22 mayors have governed Erechim. In the 2016 election, Luiz Francisco Schmidt of the PSDB won with 39.82% of valid votes, narrowly defeating Ana de Oliveira of the MDB (39.80%) by 12 votes, while Flávio Tirello of the PSB placed third with 20.38%.

The legislative power is represented by the municipal chamber, comprising 17 councilors elected for four-year terms, in accordance with Article 29 of the Constitution. The chamber’s composition is as follows: MDB with 3 seats; PT with 3 seats; PSDB with 2 seats; PDT with 2 seats; PP, PSD, PTB, PV, SD, PC do B, and PSB with 1 seat each. The chamber is responsible for drafting and voting on fundamental laws, particularly the participatory budget (Budget Guidelines Law). Erechim operates under organic laws. The city is also the seat of a comarca, established by Decree No. 4,366 on August 31, 1929, separated from the Passo Fundo comarca. Law No. 6,535 of January 31, 1973, classified the Erechim comarca as third-grade with three prosecutor positions. According to the TRE-RS (Regional Electoral Court of Rio Grande do Sul), Erechim had approximately 77,278 voters in 2016.

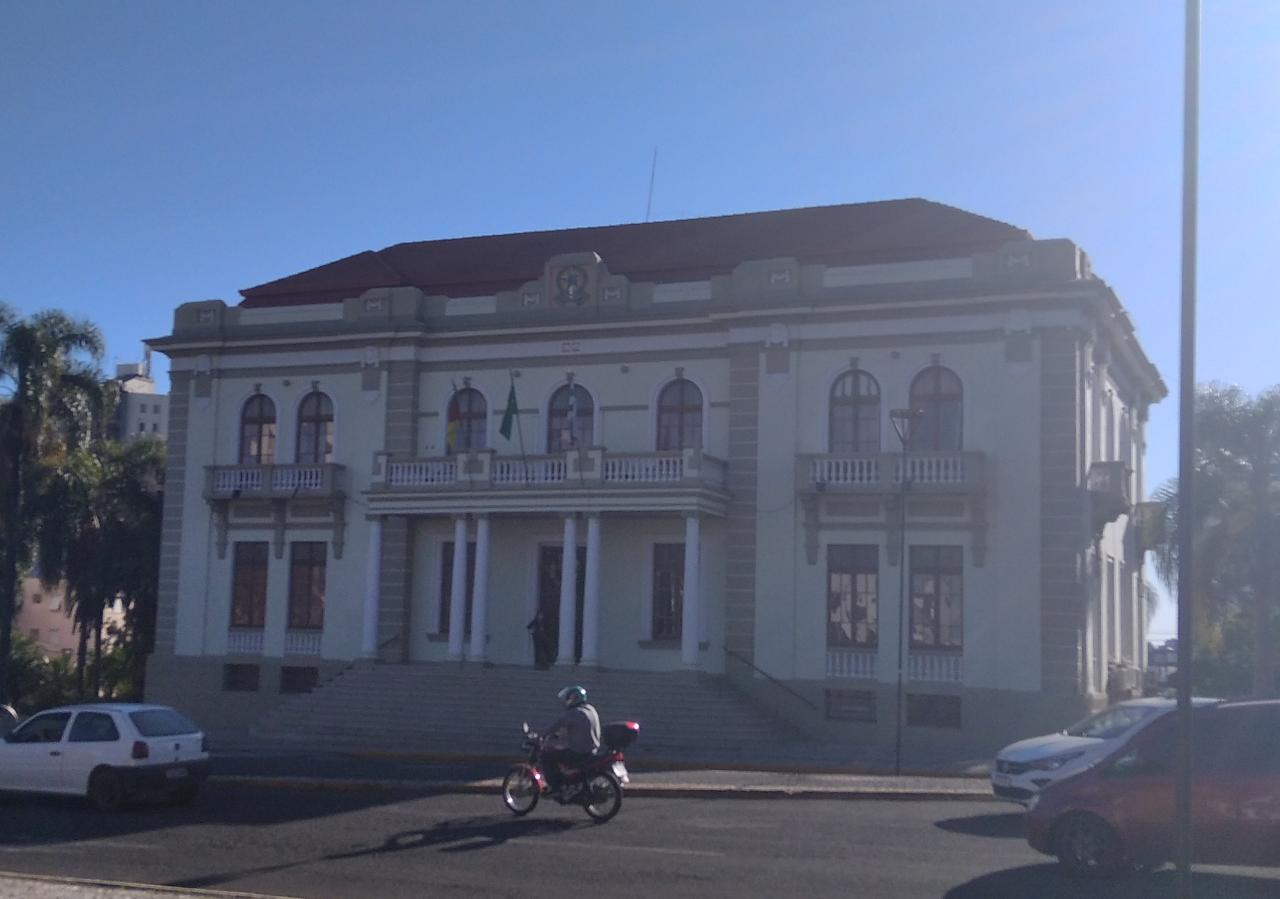
Erechim City Hall

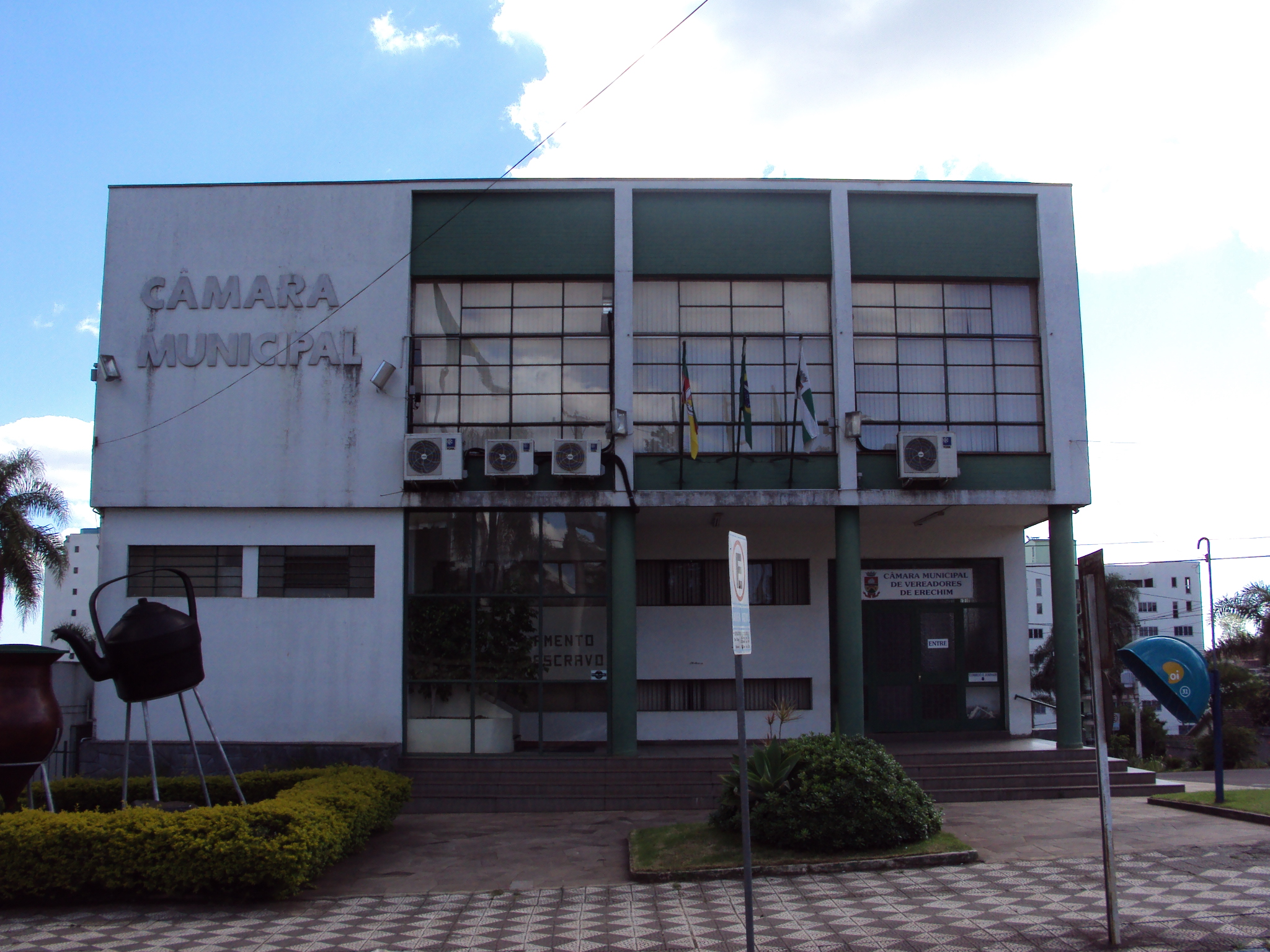
Erechim Municipal Chamber

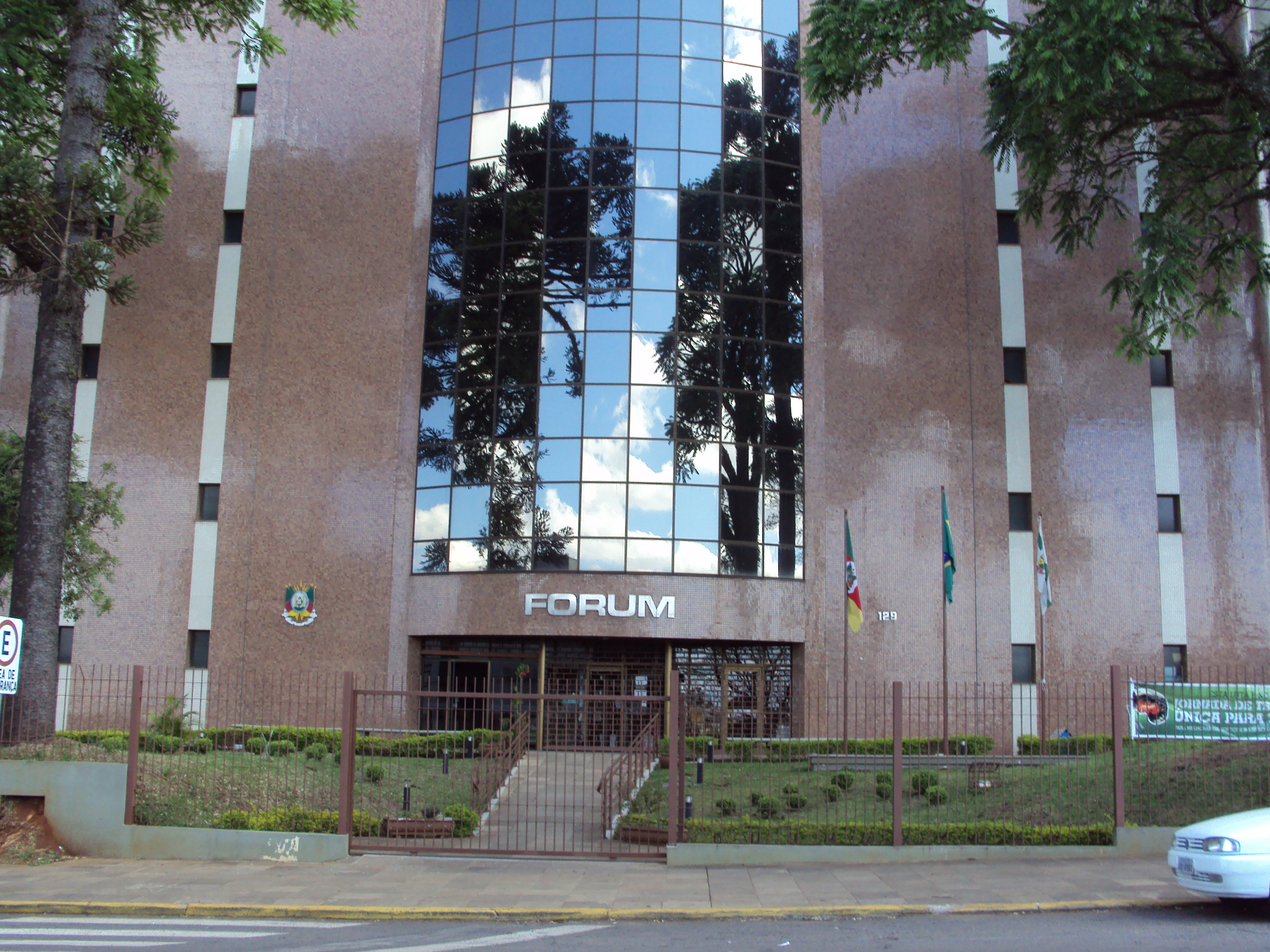
Seat of the Judicial Power in Erechim

== Subdivisions ==
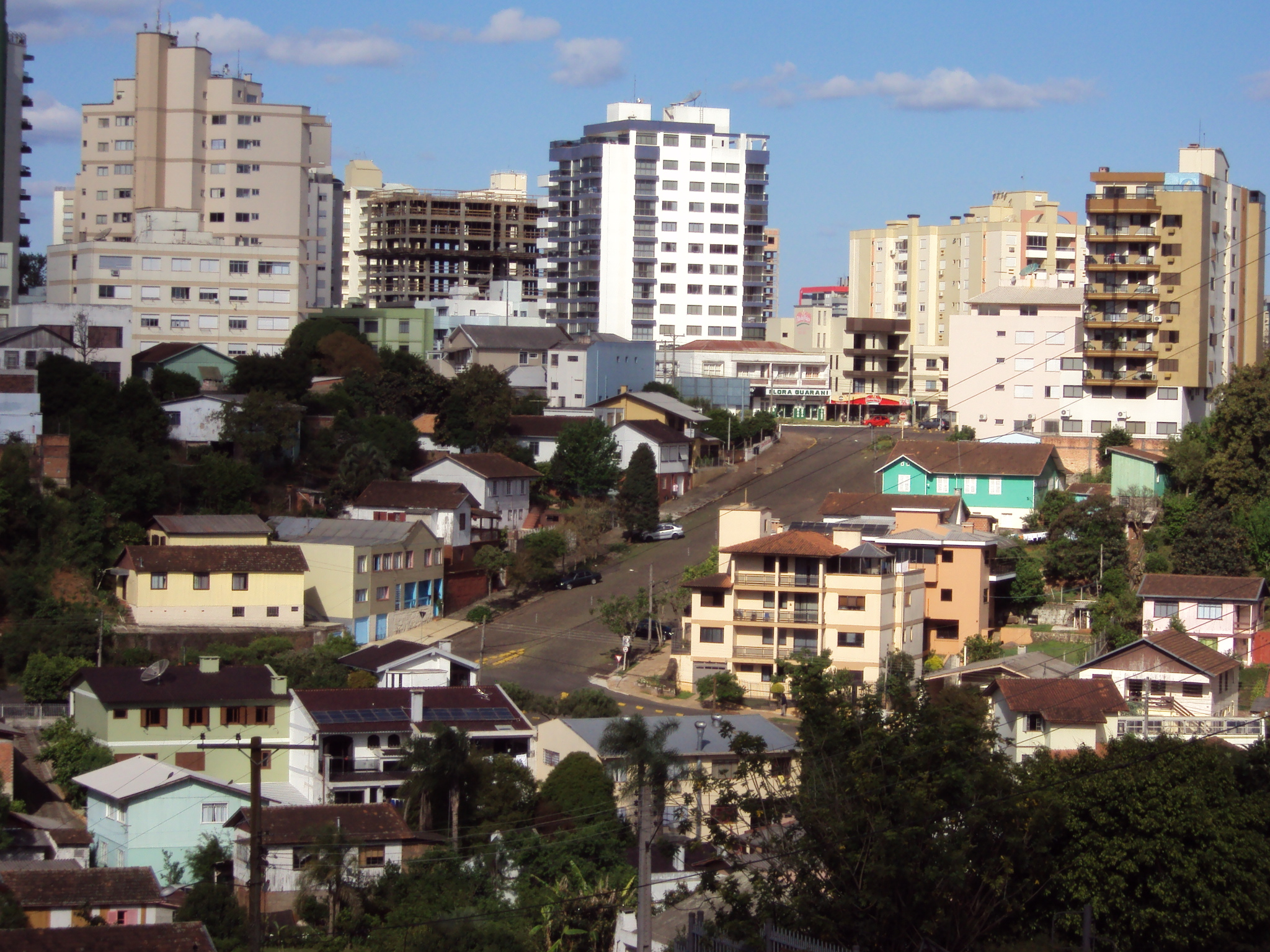
View of the downtown area of the city

When it was established as a municipality, Erechim consisted of a single district: the Seat, created under the name Erechim (formerly a village) by Municipal Act No. 2 on July 27, 1918. Currently, the city is officially divided into three districts: Capo-Erê, Jaguaretê, and Seat. The most recent change in district organization occurred through State Law No. 10,762, enacted on April 16, 1996, which separated the district of Paulo Bento from Erechim, elevating it to municipal status.

Located not far from the city center are the main neighborhoods, which house the majority of Erechim’s population. Notable examples include Bela Vista, Linho, Cerâmica, Copas Verdes, José Bonifácio, Koller, Morro da Cegonha, São Cristóvão, Três Vendas, Triângulo, and São Caetano, among others that form part of the city’s strategic map maintained by the municipal government. Most of these neighborhoods are generally considered to be middle class or upper-class areas. Further from the city center, prominent neighborhoods include Aeroporto, Atlântico, Dal Molin, Florestinha, Loteamentos, Paiol Grande, Zimmer, Presidente Vargas, and Progresso, among others. These areas typically have lower average household incomes, with some classified as lower-middle class neighborhoods.

== Economy ==
According to data from the Foundation for Economics and Statistics for 2014, Erechim’s gross domestic product (GDP) was R$4,091,150,000. The per capita GDP is R$40,207.07.

Corn, soybean, and wheat production (2008)
Product	Harvested area (Hectares)	Production (Tons)
Corn	3,500	20,300
Soybean	7,200	17,280
Wheat	3,000	5,040

=== Primary sector ===
Although agriculture contributes the least to Erechim’s GDP, it remains significant due to the diversity of its output. Of the city’s total GDP, R$36,164,000 comes from the gross added value of agriculture. According to the IBGE, in 2008, the municipality had a livestock inventory of 13,501 cattle, 27,107 pigs, 194 equines, 4 mules, 472 goats, 1,102 sheep, and 492,907 poultry, including 17,044 hens, 474,963 roosters, broilers, and chicks, and 900 quails. In 2008, the city produced 12,922,000 liters of milk from 5,800 cows, 274,000 dozen eggs, 7,829 kilograms of honey, and 1,200 kilograms of wool from sheep. In temporary crops, the main products are corn (20,300 tons), soybean (17,280 tons), and wheat (5,400 tons).

=== Secondary sector ===
The industrial sector contributes R$521,187,000 to the municipal GDP, making it the most prominent economic sector in Erechim. Approximately 700 companies of varying sizes account for 37.96% of the city’s revenue. The Industrial District, established in 1978, is the primary source of wealth in this sector and employs around 5,000 people.

The significant growth of this sector is largely due to the expansion of the industrial park, which has enabled Erechim to grow four times faster than the national average and nearly three times faster than the state of Rio Grande do Sul. This growth is also attributed to the shift of ranchers and farmers to industrial activities as a new means of generating wealth. The metalworking industry has seen the most significant growth, with employment in this sector increasing by an average of 25.4% between 1985 and 2005.

=== Tertiary sector ===
The service sector accounts for R$952,183,000 of Erechim’s GDP. This sector is a vital contributor to the city’s economy. According to IBGE, in 2008, Erechim had 5,439 commercial establishments and employed 74,919 workers, with a total of 40,925 people employed and 33,994 salaried workers. Salaries and other compensations totaled R$478,599,000, with an average monthly wage of 2.7 minimum wages. Commercial activity contributes 17.85% to the municipality’s revenue. The tourism sector is increasingly being developed as a potential significant source of income for the population.

== Education ==
Erechim is home to its own federal university, the Federal University of Fronteira Sul (UFFS), which is renowned for its focus on social inclusion and academic research across the southern region of Brazil. The city also hosts a campus of the Rio Grande do Sul State University (UERGS), which offers high-quality bachelor’s degree programs, as well as a campus of the Federal Institute of Rio Grande do Sul (IFRS), offering technical, technological, and bachelor’s degree programs. Additionally, the city is home to the Integrated Regional University of Alto Uruguai and Missões (URI).

According to the Preliminary Course Score (CPC) and the General Index of Evaluated Institutions (IGC) from the Anísio Teixeira National Institute for Educational Studies and Research (Inep), the Federal University of Fronteira Sul is the top university in the Alto Uruguai region. It is also ranked as the fourth-best federal university in Rio Grande do Sul and the 24th in Brazil. In terms of undergraduate program quality, UFFS ranks third nationally. Erechim has schools throughout its territory. Due to extensive urbanization, the few residents in the rural area have easy access to schools in nearby urban neighborhoods. Municipal schools have a slightly lower educational quality compared to state schools, but the city government is conducting studies to improve public municipal education to achieve better results in the Basic Education Development Index (IDEB).

In 2008, the municipality had approximately 18,493 enrollments, 1,149 teachers, and 67 schools in both public and private networks.

Education in Erechim by numbers
Level	Enrollments	Teachers	Schools (Total)
Early childhood education	1,970	123	37
Primary education	12,697	738	36
Secondary education	4,134	348	15

== Urban infrastructure ==
Erechim boasts robust infrastructure. In 2000, the city had 26,999 dwellings, including apartments, houses, and rooms. Of these, 19,503 were owned properties, with 17,231 fully paid (63.82%), 2,272 in the process of acquisition (8.42%), and 4,894 rented (18.83%). Additionally, 2,323 dwellings were provided, with 683 supplied by employers (2.53%) and 1,640 provided through other means (6.07%). Another 279 were occupied in other ways (1.03%).

The municipality provides treated water, electricity, wastewater services, urban cleaning, fixed telephony, and mobile telephony. In 2000, 90.11% of households were served by the general water supply network; 89.70% of residences had garbage collection, and 89.07% had sanitary drainage. The city’s Gini coefficient is 0.40.

=== Social infrastructure ===
According to the municipal government, social infrastructure encompasses four key areas: education, income and poverty, sanitation, and healthcare. These are evaluated using the Economic and Social Development Index (IDESE). On this scale, which ranges from zero to one, Erechim ranks as the tenth municipality overall in the regional classification.

==== Income and poverty ====
In the category of income and poverty, Erechim is considered to have a medium level, ranking 96th in the state. Compared to previous years, it was ranked 30th in 1991 and 75th in 2000. There has been a slight reduction in poverty indicators and a notable increase in the number of people experiencing hunger. However, this does not pose a significant risk to the municipality’s development.

The municipal per capita income is R$13,251.00. The Gini coefficient, which measures social inequality, is 0.40, where 1.00 represents the highest inequality and 0.00 the lowest. The poverty incidence, as measured by IBGE, is 26.30%, with a lower poverty threshold of 15.70%, an upper threshold of 22.90%, and a subjective poverty incidence of 19.39%.

==== Healthcare ====
Based on the Socioeconomic Development Index (IDESE), Erechim demonstrates strong performance in its healthcare system but ranks poorly statewide, at 302nd place. In recent years, the city has climbed the rankings due to declines in other municipalities. The infant mortality rate is 3.16 per thousand live births. The municipality has forty healthcare facilities, twelve public and 28 private, including hospitals, emergency rooms, health centers, and dental services. In total, the city has 286 hospital beds, with 153 public and 133 private.

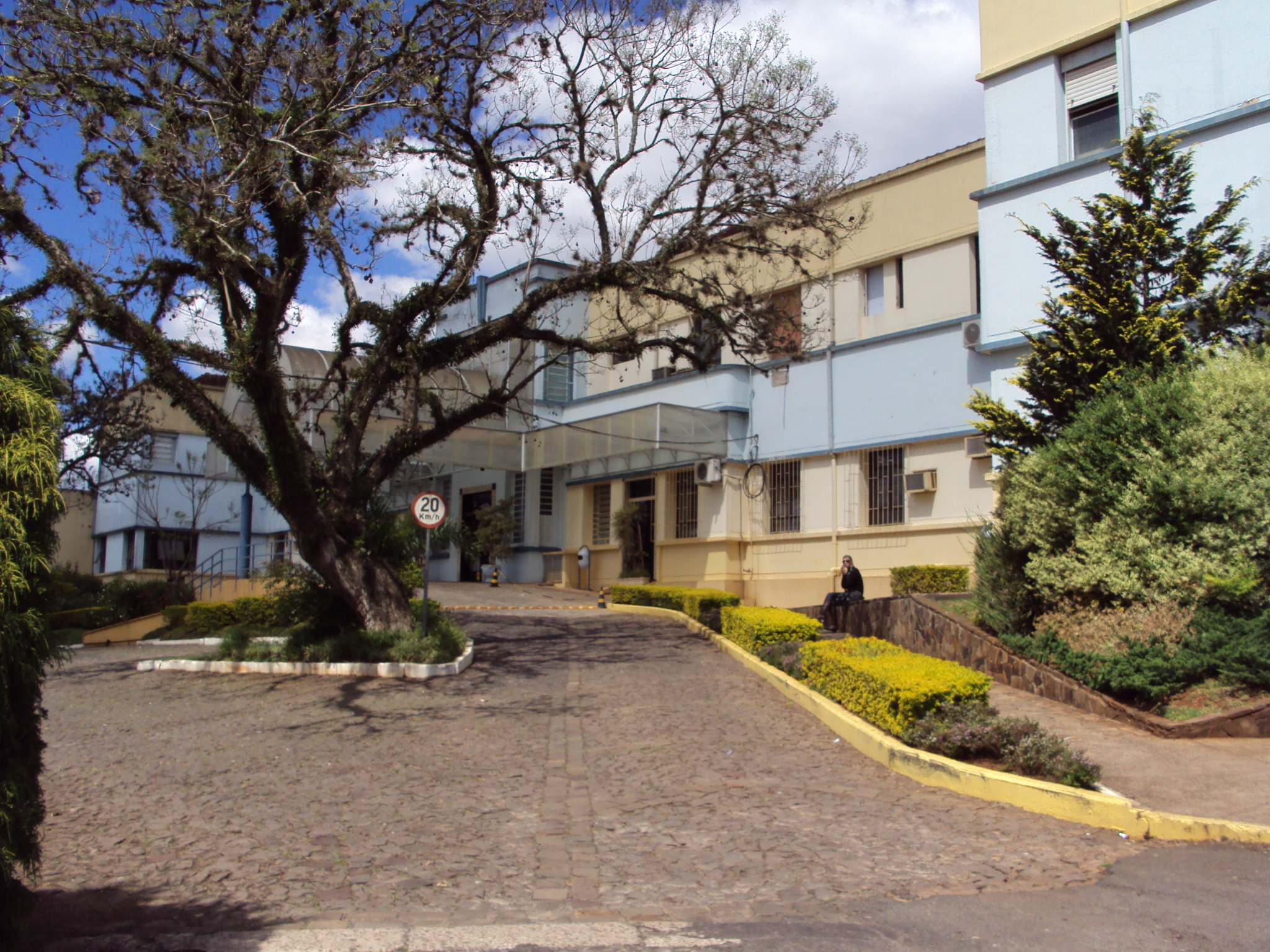
Entrance to the Erechim Charity Hospital

Key hospitals in Erechim include:

- Santa Terezinha Hospital Foundation of Erechim: It is a general hospital that serves as a regional reference for the Unified Health System (SUS) in the area covered by the 11th Regional Health Coordination Office, which includes 31 municipalities. It is a reference for cancer treatment in the northern region of the state, hosting the High-Complexity Oncology Center, which includes chemotherapy, radiotherapy, and a Women’s Reference Center. It has 175 beds, a 24-hour emergency room, a surgical center, an obstetric center, and neonatal, pediatric, and adult general ICUs.
- Erechim Charity Hospital: Founded in the 1930s, it has operated as a philanthropic institution since 1951. In January 2004, the Charity Hospital Clinical Center was inaugurated, integrating professionals from various health specialties with the hospital. It currently has approximately 122 beds, 155 medical staff, and 355 employees.
- Primary Healthcare Units: Erechim has twelve primary healthcare units located in various neighborhoods across all city regions, serving areas such as Centro, Progresso, São Vicente de Paulo, Paiol Grande, Presidente Vargas, Aldo Arioli, São Cristóvão, Estevan Carraro, Capoerê, Jaguaretê, Atlântico, and Bela Vista.

In 2009, Erechim gained national attention during the swine flu pandemic as the site of Brazil’s first fatal case of swine flu. The victim, truck driver Vanderlei Vial, who had traveled to Argentina between May 28 and June 15, 2009, returned to Erechim on June 19 and sought medical attention the following day with symptoms. He was hospitalized on June 23, transferred to Passo Fundo, and passed away on June 28. The 2009 flu pandemic was a global outbreak of a swine flu variant, with the first cases reported in Mexico in mid-March 2009. On May 7, Brazil’s Ministry of Health confirmed the first four cases of H1N1 flu in the country. According to the World Health Organization, the virus caused over 18,000 deaths worldwide since its emergence in April 2009.

==== Sanitation ====
Among the four components of social infrastructure, sanitation is the least developed in Erechim. Despite this, it is in sanitation that the city holds its highest state ranking, at 11th, due to significant improvements between 1998 and 2004. Federal Law No. 11,445 of 2007 established a new framework for basic sanitation, mandating services for water supply, sanitary sewage, urban cleaning with solid waste management, and stormwater drainage in all Brazilian municipalities. This requires the development of a basic sanitation plan, economic feasibility analysis, regulatory standards, public hearings, a tariff system, conditions for sustainability of economic-financial balance, and contract duration.

=== Public safety ===
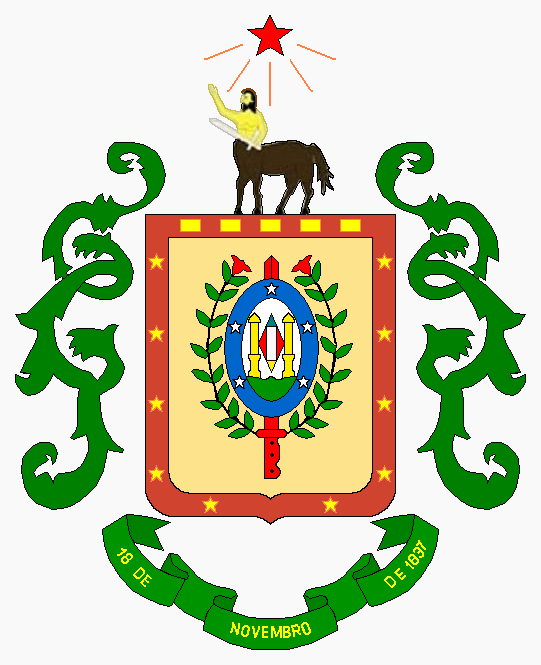
Emblem of the Military Brigade of Rio Grande do Sul

In 1980, Erechim made statewide headlines due to four murders committed by serial killer Luiz Baú, who had escaped from the Erechim State Prison and stabbed his victims, mostly young boys, with extreme cruelty, earning the nickname "The Monster of Erechim".

As in most medium and large Brazilian municipalities, crime is a challenge in Erechim. In 2006, the homicide rate was 15.1%. The rate of fatalities by firearm peaked at 30.2% in 2003, dropped to 7.6% between 2004 and 2005, but rose to 11.9% in 2006. The rate of deaths from traffic accidents increased from 12.1% in 2002 to 29.2% in 2006.

To address high crime rates, the municipal government, in collaboration with the Military Brigade of Rio Grande do Sul (BMRS) and the Municipal Secretariat for Public Safety and Social Protection, established under Article 27 of Law 4,420 of February 11, 2009, has implemented various measures. One such measure is Law No. 4,723, which amended Article 4 of Law No. 3,925 of December 13, 2005, mandating that bars, restaurants, entertainment venues, and similar establishments in Erechim display signs prohibiting the sale of alcohol, cigarettes, and similar products to minors. This has helped reduce incidents involving minors. Another initiative is the Violence Prevention Program (PPV), aimed at reducing violence through a social network that identifies, integrates, and promotes governmental and non-governmental actions to combat and prevent crime, focusing on high-risk neighborhoods and communities.

=== Transportation ===
==== Air transport ====
The Erechim Airport (IATA: ERM, ICAO: SSER) faces competition from nearby airports in Passo Fundo and Chapecó, limiting its growth. However, plans are in place to expand and renovate the passenger terminal by 65 m², bringing the total to 330.49 m². This includes accessibility improvements for people with disabilities, air conditioning, fencing, and new furniture, funded through partnerships with SEINFRA (State Secretariat for Infrastructure and Logistics) and the Federal Airport Assistance Program (PROFAA), with contributions from the Erechim municipality. By 2011, the implementation of a Category 4 Firefighting Section was planned.

A key operator at the airport is NHT Linhas Aéreas, offering flights to Porto Alegre and São Paulo. The airline operates a fleet of six LET 410 UVP E-20 aircraft, designed for 19 passengers and two crew members, manufactured in Europe by Aircraft Industries and equipped with advanced navigation and safety systems. The Erechim route has recently been enhanced with the addition of two new aircraft.

==== Urban transport ====
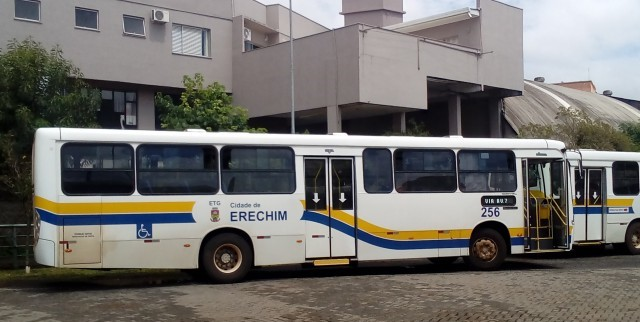
Bus representing public transport in the city

The first urban transport company in Erechim, "Empresas de Transportes Gaurama Ltda," was established in 1953, operating routes from Marcelino Ramos and Gaurama to Erechim. From 1954, it began providing urban transport within the city. Until 1960, it served five neighborhoods: Aeroporto, Linho, Cemitério Municipal, Três Vendas, and Piscina Clube. Since 1980, Gaurama has focused solely on municipal transport after selling its intermunicipal routes. Currently, nearly all city neighborhoods are covered.

The fare for public transport aligns with that of the state capital. However, transferring to another bus requires a new ticket. The standard urban transport fare is currently R$4.80. A student fare system offers tickets at R$2.40, valid only with a Student Transport Card.

In 2019, an electronic ticketing system was introduced, using cards, as implemented in many other cities. By 2022, the use of physical tokens for fares was phased out.

==== Road and rail transport ====
In 2009, Erechim’s vehicle fleet totaled 46,950, including 30,089 cars, 1,651 trucks, 481 tractor-trucks, 3,552 pickups, 213 minibuses, 7,492 motorcycles, 2,948 scooters, 515 buses, and nine wheeled tractors. The city’s paved avenues and numerous traffic lights facilitate traffic flow, but the growing number of vehicles over the past decade has led to increasingly slow traffic, particularly in the Seat district. Additionally, finding parking spaces in the commercial center has become challenging, impacting local commerce.

The Erechim Bus Terminal is a major hub for road transport in northern Rio Grande do Sul and southern Santa Catarina, serving destinations in over ten Brazilian states, including Mato Grosso, Minas Gerais, Paraná, Bahia, and the Federal District. It covers the southern, parts of the southeastern, central-western, and northeastern regions of Brazil, with key operators including Reunidas and Unesul.

Erechim also has a historic railway station, which played a significant role in the city and region’s development. Inaugurated on August 3, 1910, the local railway network is currently abandoned. However, municipalities in the Alto Uruguai and plateau regions have united to demand action from América Latina Logística (ALL), the company responsible for the regional rail network, regarding the neglected state of the railway in Alto Uruguai and the 386 km stretch to Santa Maria.

=== Services and communications ===
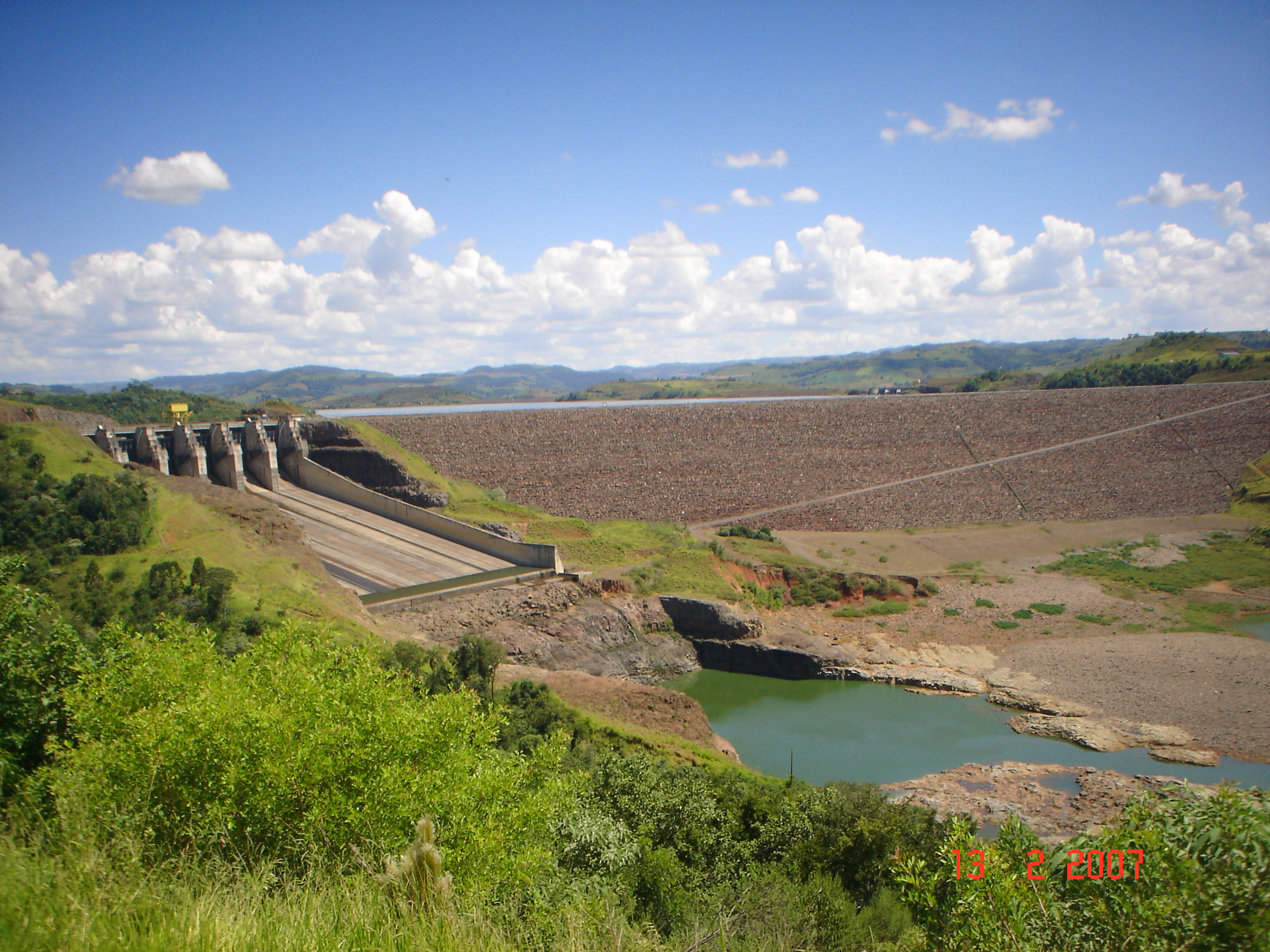
Itá UHE, one of the facilities supplying energy to the region

Erechim is served by the electric company Rio Grande Energia (RGE) since 1997, covering 262 municipalities, or 51% of Rio Grande do Sul’s total municipalities. Power generation is no longer local but comes from the Functional Planning Region 9, which includes major hydroelectric plants such as Itá and Machadinho. Along with Passo Fundo, Erechim is among RGE’s highest energy consumers. Existing and planned PCH and MCH transmission lines are expected to meet demand. The Erechim microregion is a significant energy exporter and requires minimal upgrades. However, rural areas generally lack sufficient lighting to maintain temperatures in poultry farms or pigsties or to install cooling systems for milk and meat. Approximately 98% of urban residences have electricity, though this drops to 75–95% in the rural area. The CRERAL (Alto Uruguai Regional Rural Electrification Cooperative), founded on July 23, 1969, serves around 6,000 consumers as an alternative distributor.

Water supply for the entire city is managed by the Rio Grande do Sul Sanitation Company (Corsan). Sewage collection is handled by the municipal government. Internet services include dial-up, broadband (ADSL), and fiber optic, offered by various free and paid ISPs. Mobile phone services are provided by multiple operators, with 3G access available since September 1, 2008. Erechim’s area code (DDD) is 054, and its postal code ranges from 99700-001 to 99717-999. On January 19, 2009, Erechim, along with 137 other municipalities in Rio Grande do Sul sharing the same DDD, gained access to number portability, allowing users to switch operators without changing their phone numbers.

Erechim has several circulating newspapers, including Jornal Diário da Manhã, Jornal Boa Vista, Jornal Bom Dia, Jornal Voz Regional, A Região, and O Esporte. The city is also home to six radio stations: Difusão FM 94.9, Virtual FM 104.7, Cultura FM 105.9, Rede Colinas FM 90.7, Difusão Sul-Riograndense AM 650, and TchêErechim AM 1200. Television stations include a local RBS affiliate, RBS TV Erechim, as well as repeaters for SBT RS, BAND RS, TVE RS, and TV Pampa.

== Culture and leisure ==
=== Tourism ===
Among Erechim’s most visited tourist attractions are its museums and landmarks, such as the São José Cathedral, the city’s only cathedral, built between 1969 and 1977 in the Baroque style; the Cultural Hub, a venue for significant meetings that also functions as a restaurant and an auditorium with a capacity of over 800 people; and the Popular Market, inaugurated in 2005, which serves as a marketplace for vendors who previously sold goods on the streets.

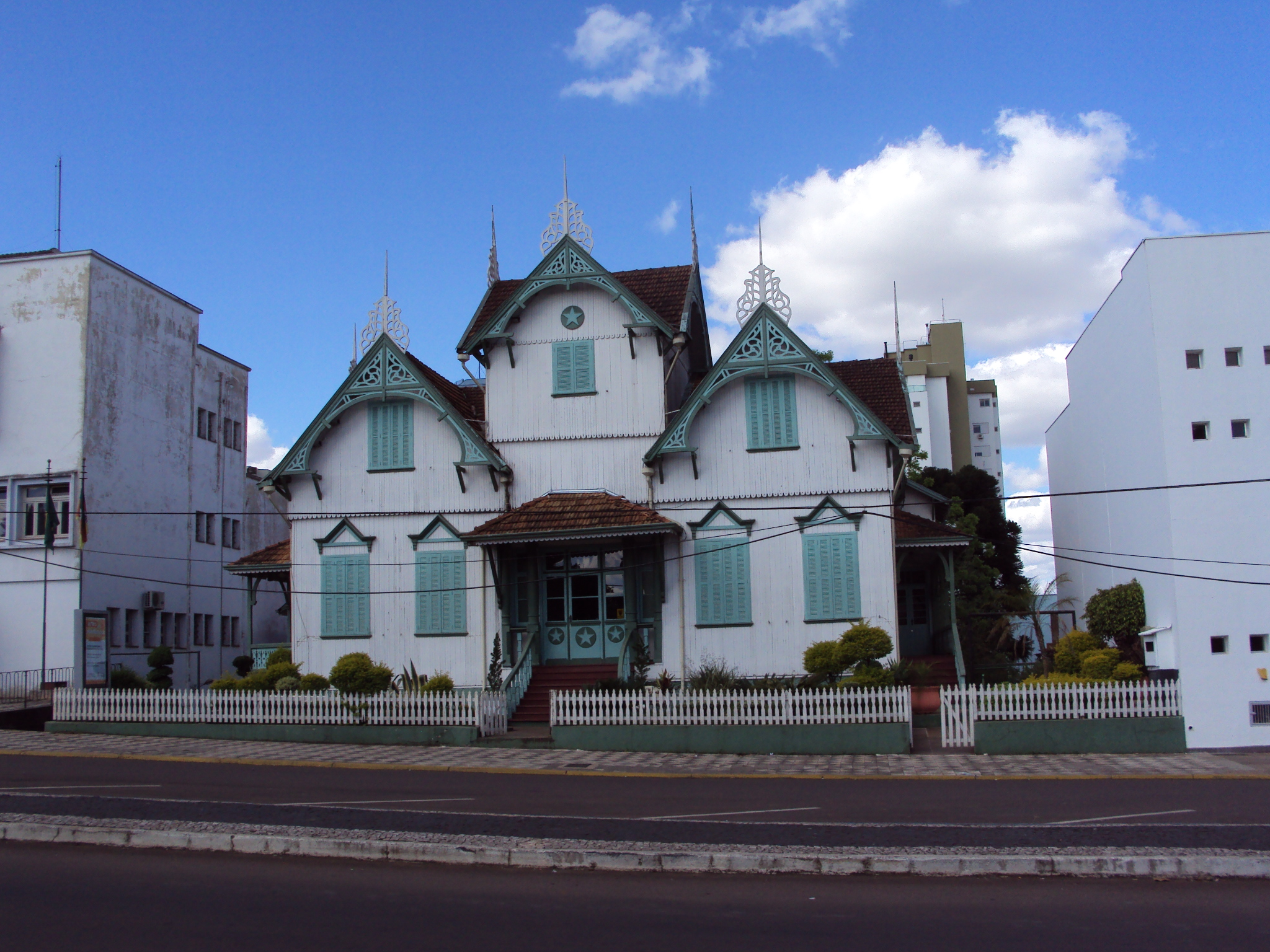
Built between 1912 and 1915, Castelinho is the municipality’s first public building

Other notable tourist attractions include:

- Longines Malinowski Park: The main municipal park, spanning 24 hectares and featuring Brazilian pine trees in its vegetation.
- Castelinho: A wooden building constructed between 1912 and 1915, a symbol of the city located near Praça da Bandeira. It is the city’s oldest building.
- 25 de Julho Cultural Center: Considered the largest cultural center in Rio Grande do Sul, it hosts national and international performances. It was founded in 1983.
- Vale Dourado: Located at the end of Maurício Cardoso Avenue, it is a key leisure spot in the city, featuring both natural and artificial attractions.
- Praça da Bandeira: The city’s central landmark, inaugurated in 1953, featuring a flagpole where ten avenues converge, a fountain, and a bust of President Getúlio Vargas, among other elements.

=== Architecture ===
Erechim, particularly its central region, is characterized by a diverse and significant architectural ensemble. According to the municipal government, the most prominent architectural style shaping the city’s urban landscape is Art Deco, first introduced at the International Exhibition of Modern Decorative and Industrial Arts in Paris in 1925. This style emerged as a bridge between the eclectic style and the then-radical modernism, featuring geometric forms and abstract designs.

Art Deco’s decorative motifs primarily rely on the geometry of the cube, sphere, and straight line, along with zigzags—horizontal and vertical lines that form stepped patterns inspired by Mesoamerican, indigenous, and African cultures. The style also incorporates maritime prow-like elements supported by mast-like pillars, ellipses, and luxurious materials such as marble and granite. Art Deco facades adhere to geometric precision and linear rhythm, with curved lines following a well-defined arc and straight lines, as if drawn with a ruler.

Erechim was one of Brazil’s first modern planned cities. Its urban layout was inspired by planning concepts used in Washington, D.C. (1791), Paris (1850), Buenos Aires (1580), and Belo Horizonte (1897). The city’s design features wide streets, a strong hierarchy, and diagonal avenues intersecting a grid, creating convergence points. Key elements include a perpendicular street grid intersected by diagonal avenues, uniformly sized blocks, and a perimeter avenue.

=== Traditions, arts, and events ===
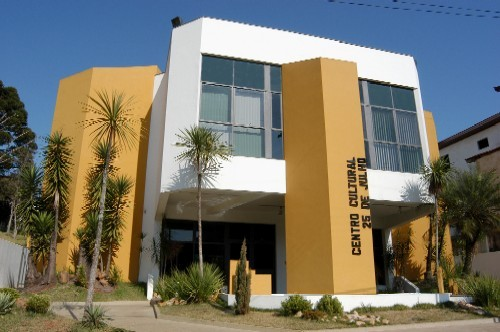
25 de Julho Cultural Center, a venue for numerous cultural events

Theater and cinema play significant roles in Erechim. Throughout the year, the municipal government, in partnership with local or regional companies, organizes various cultural events. Recently, Erechim earned the nickname “Capital of Amateur Theater in Rio Grande do Sul” for hosting numerous theater-related events. The 25 de Julho Cultural Center is a primary venue for these activities. Events promoting local and regional music are also frequently held, such as performances by the choir of the Regional Integrated University of Alto Uruguai and Missões (URI). The city also promotes and encourages artistic work by schoolchildren.

Erechim has a notable tradition of crafts and cuisine. Regional dishes, ranging from pies and bonbons to homemade meals such as rice and beans, and artisanal products are sold at city stalls, fairs, or recurring events. The Erechim Artisans Association supports local and regional artisans by providing work opportunities. Recently, the Municipal Council approved a law granting artisans more space for sales and promotion, including an area in Júlio de Castilhos Square, where the Erechim Artisan House was established.

Erechim also hosts a multi-sector fair known as Frinape, which celebrated its 14th edition in 2013.

=== Sports ===
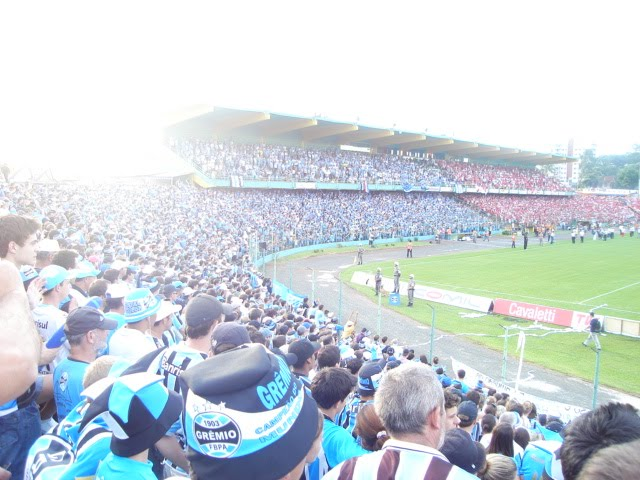
Estádio Olímpico Colosso da Lagoa during a Grenal match

As in much of Brazil, football is the most popular sport in Erechim. The city’s main club is Ypiranga Futebol Clube, commonly known as Ypiranga de Erechim, founded on August 18, 1924. It plays its home games at the Estádio Olímpico Colosso da Lagoa, inaugurated on September 2, 1970, with a capacity of up to 30,000 spectators. The record attendance was approximately 25,000 for a match between Ypiranga and Sport Club Internacional on August 18, 1974, which Internacional won 2-0. It is the third-largest stadium in Rio Grande do Sul, behind Arena do Grêmio and Beira-Rio. The field measures 110 m by 80 m. The inaugural match was between Grêmio Foot-Ball Porto Alegrense and Santos Futebol Clube, with Santos winning 2-0, with goals by Pelé (his 1,040th career goal) and Léo.

Erechim also excels in athletics. The Erechim Runners Club (CORRE) represents the sport, with over 20 athletes, including 10 high-performance competitors in adult and youth categories for both genders. CORRE organizes events and sports projects, ranging from social inclusion to high-performance training, promoting athletics and street running as means of leisure, health, and quality of life. On December 14, 2010, Erechim hosted the “Stars Game,” a charity match featuring celebrities and musicians against members of the Municipal Council and Ypiranga players.

A major sporting event is the Erechim City School Olympics, held annually by the municipal government in partnership with the Municipal Secretariat for Culture, Sports, and Tourism. It involves students from municipal schools competing in various sports, including futsal, volleyball, basketball, athletics, chess, table tennis, swimming, handball, and dominoes, for participants aged 7 to 15. In 2010, 23 schools participated. Another significant event is the Rally de Erechim, an annual international rally competition since 1998, considered Brazil’s largest and one of South America’s most prominent. The inaugural event featured a starting grid of about ten cars, with only two Erechim teams participating. Winners included Cassandro Maloz and Gustavo Priess, followed by Luiz Tenebro and Marco Marini (category 2.0); Ulisses Berthold and André Pagliosa in category N3, followed by Cláudio Rossi and Fernando Bitencourt; Paulo Lemos and Maria Antonite in A7; and Luis Tedesco and Alberto Blanco in A6. In category 1.6, Fernando Mello and Blender won.

=== Holidays ===
Erechim observes four public holidays, eight national holidays, and four optional holidays. Municipal holidays include the Ragamuffin War Day on September 20, All Souls’ Day on November 2, and the floating holidays of Good Friday and Corpus Christi, which is held on the Thursday following Trinity Sunday. According to Law No. 9,093 of September 12, 1995, municipalities may have up to four public holidays, including Good Friday.

== See also ==
- List of municipalities in Rio Grande do Sul
