= Balbinotti =

Balbinotti is a surname. Notable people with the surname include:

- Gabriel Balbinotti (born 1998), Canadian soccer player
- Odílio Balbinotti (1941–2026), Brazilian politician
