= Odílio Balbinotti =

Brazilian politician (1941–2026)

Member of the Chamber of Deputies of Brazil for Paraná
- In office 1 February 1995 – 31 January 2015

Personal details
- Born: 8 June 1941 Gaurama, Rio Grande do Sul, Brazil
- Died: 4 February 2026 (aged 84) Rondonópolis, Mato Grosso, Brazil
- Party: PDT (1993–1995); PTB (1996–1997); PSDB (1997–2003); MDB (2003–2026)
- Education: Federal University of São Carlos (no degree)
- Occupation: Businessman

Odílio Balbinotti (8 June 1941 – 4 February 2026) was a Brazilian politician. A member of multiple political parties, he served in the Chamber of Deputies from 1995 to 2015.

Balbinotti died of complications from Alzheimer's disease in Rondonópolis, on 4 February 2026, at the age 84.
