= Alto Uruguai =

Geographic region in Brazil

Alto Uruguai is the designation for a physiographic region in the state of Rio Grande do Sul, Brazil.

== Location ==
It is located between the Uruguay River and the Ijuí River, bordering Marcelino Ramos in the northern part of the state. The region includes the main municipalities of Santo Ângelo, Erechim, Tenente Portela, Palmeira das Missões, Sarandi, Santa Rosa, Frederico Westphalen, Getúlio Vargas, Três Passos, Giruá, and Três de Maio, with its capital being Erechim, having a population of 116,894 people.

== Geography ==
Its area covers 26,062 km^{2}. The terrain consists of a basaltic soil plain, deeply cut by tributaries of the Uruguay River, with gentle relief towards the Uruguay River and more rugged terrain in the opposite direction of the watercourse. The region is situated at an elevation of 500 to 700 meters, featuring deep valleys with steep slopes ranging from 100 to 300 meters. Broadleaf forests extend parallel to the Uruguay River in a 100-kilometer-wide strip. In the plateau, at an altitude exceeding 300 to 400 meters, this forest borders grasslands. Pine forests begin to the east near Tenente Portela, running alongside the broadleaf forest and intermingling with grasslands.

== Bibliography ==
- BORGES FORTES, Amyr. Aspectos Fisiográficos, Demográficos e Econômicos do Rio Grande do Sul. Serviço Social da Indústria, 1959

== Ver também ==
- Physiography of Rio Grande do Sul
