= Áurea =

Municipality in Rio Grande do Sul, Brazil

Coordinates: 27°42′S 52°04′W

- Municipality
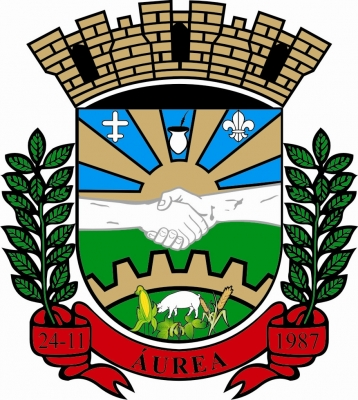
- Flag Coat of arms
- Interactive map of Áurea
- Country: Brazil
- Time zone: UTC−3 (BRT)

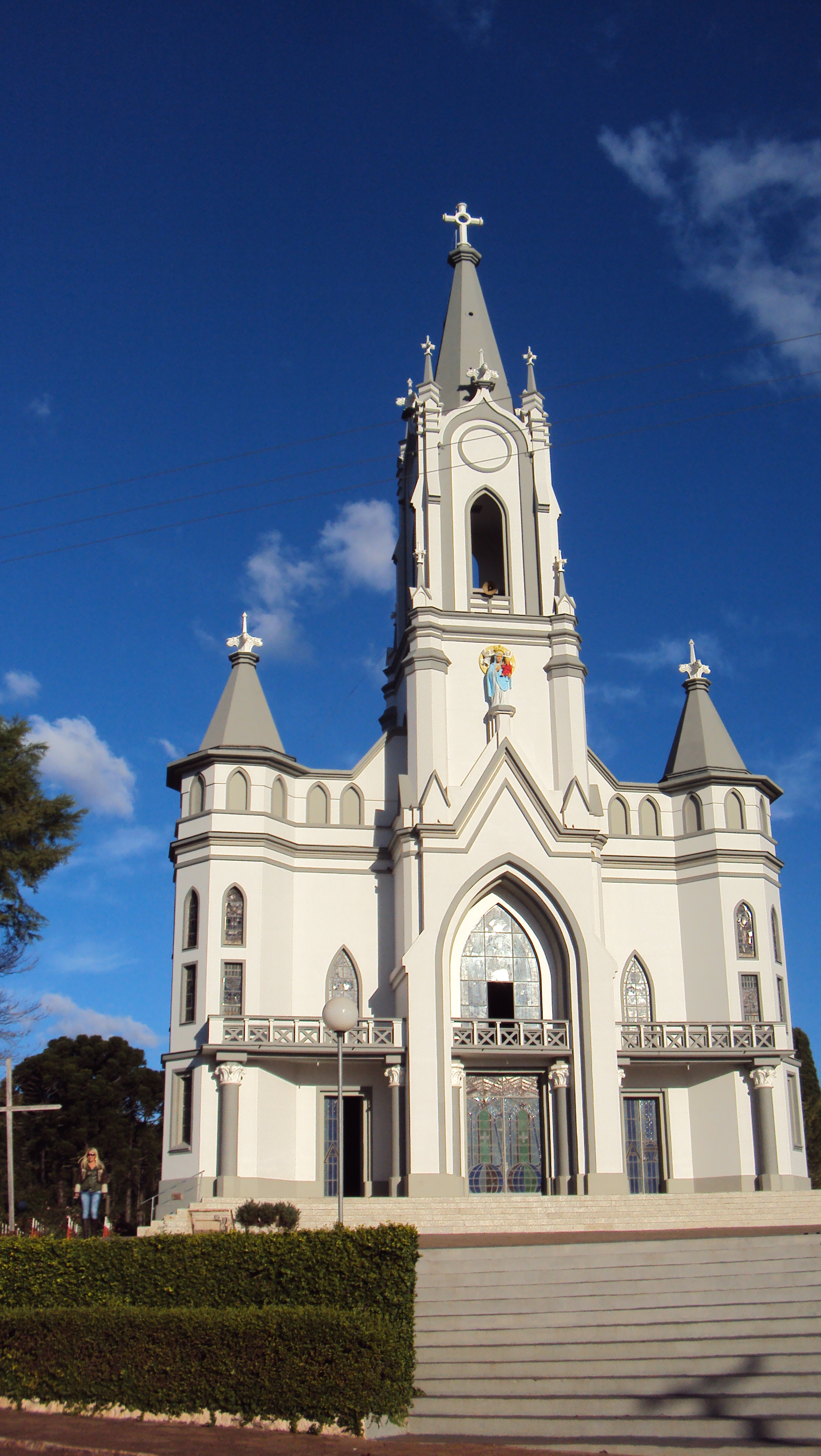
Parish Church of Our Lady of Częstochowa in Áurea

Áurea is a municipality in the state of Rio Grande do Sul, Brazil. As of 2020, the estimated population was 3,535.

The village was founded in the early 20th century by Polish immigrants. Today, still around 90% of the population is Polish-Brazilian and the nickname of Áurea is the Polish Capital of Brazil (Capital Polonesa do Brasil) or the Capital of Polish Brazilians (Capital Polonesa dos Brasileiros). In July 2022 the Polish language became legally declared as another official language (alongside Portuguese) of the municipality of Áurea.

== See also ==
- List of municipalities in Rio Grande do Sul
