= Erebango =

Municipality in Rio Grande do Sul, Brazil

Coordinates: 27°53′S 52°18′W

- Municipality
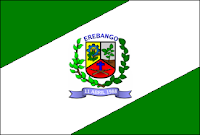
- Flag Coat of arms
- Interactive map of Erebango
- Country: Brazil
- Time zone: UTC−3 (BRT)

Erebango is a municipality in the state of Rio Grande do Sul, Brazil. As of 2020, the estimated population was 2,982.

== See also ==
- List of municipalities in Rio Grande do Sul
