= Paulo Bento, Rio Grande do Sul =

Municipality of Rio Grande do Sul, Brazil

Municipality of Paulo Bento
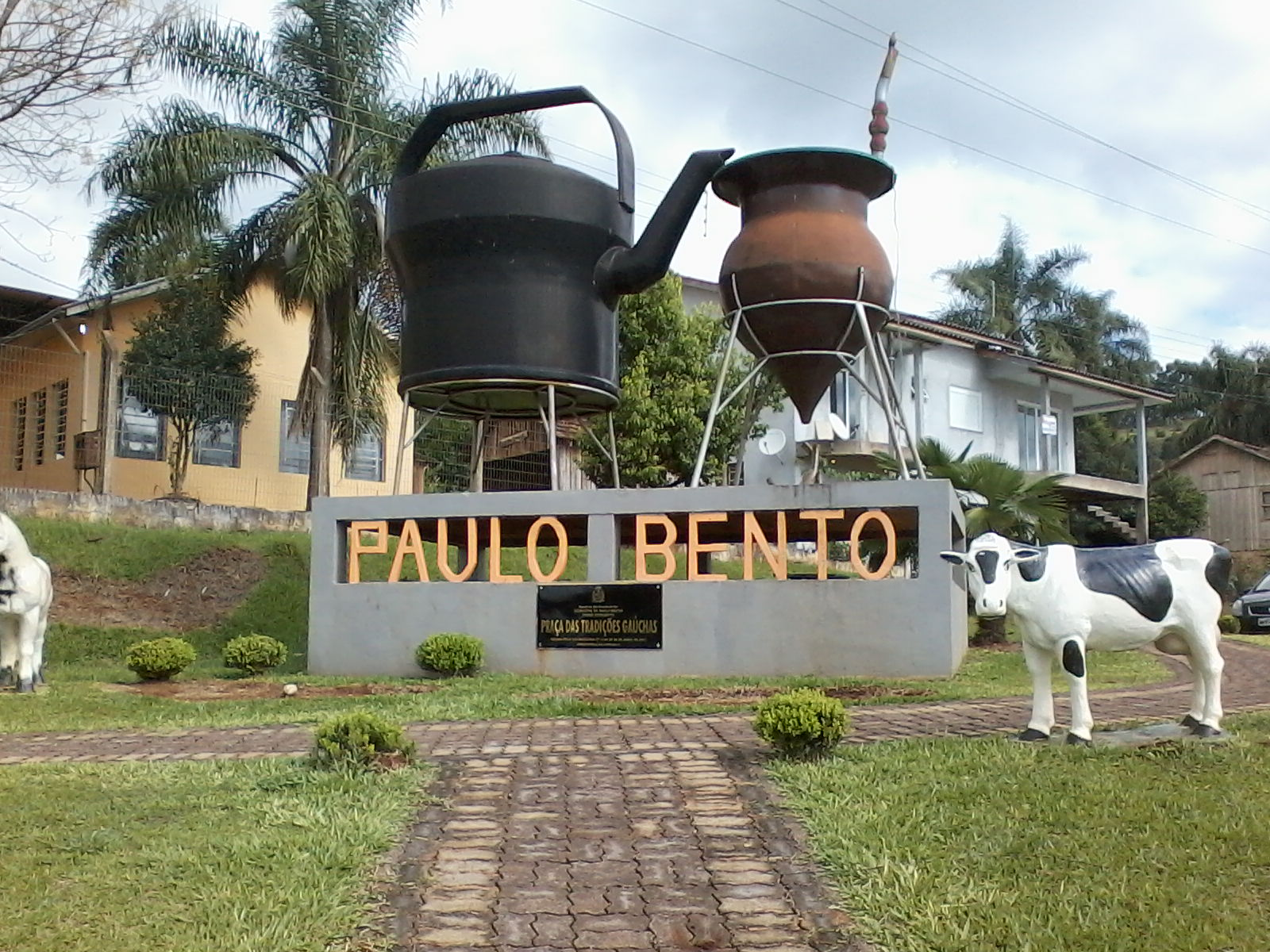
- Praça das Tradições Gaúchas (Gauchas Traditions Square)

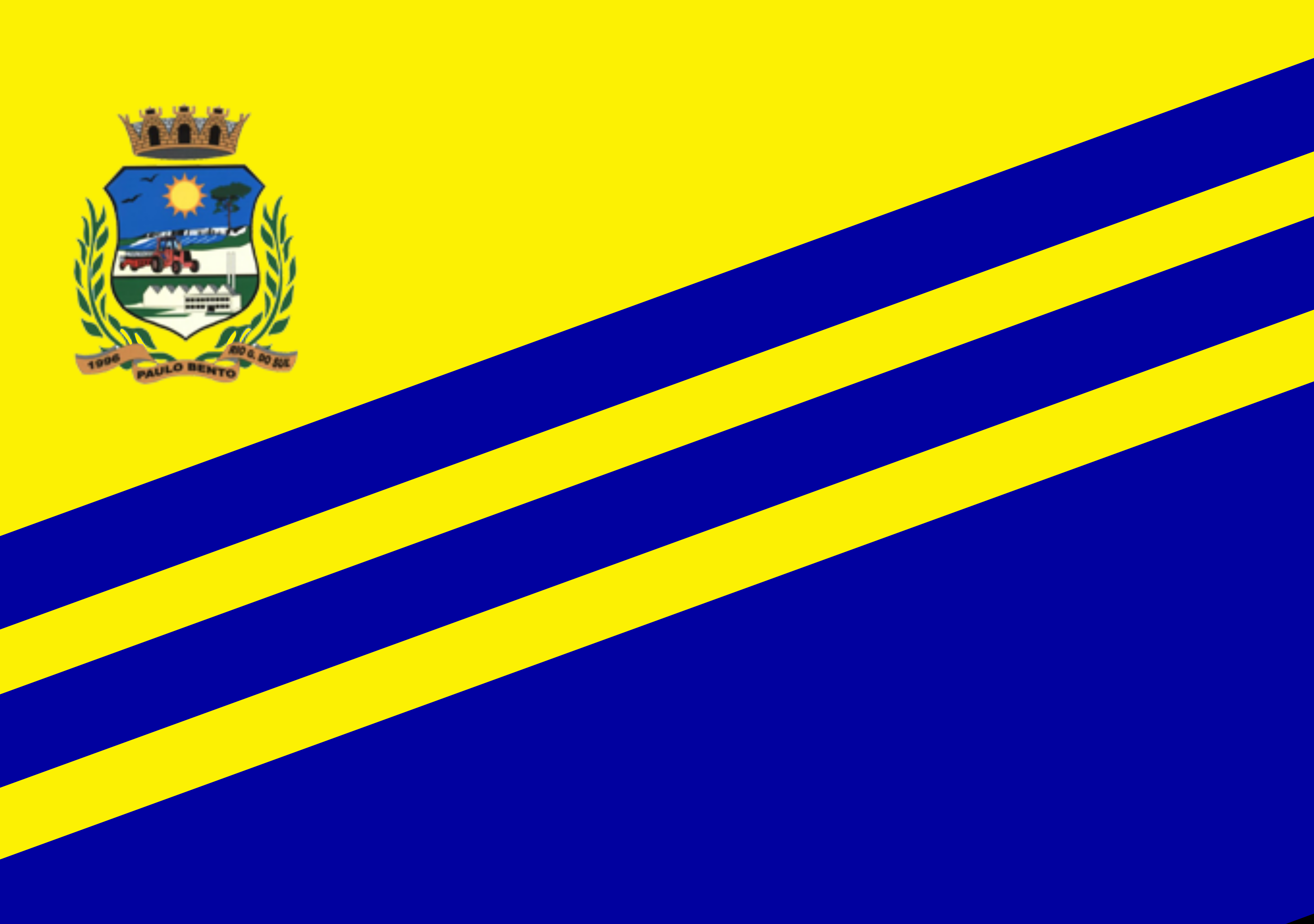
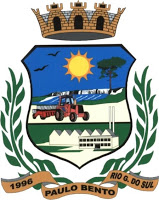
- Flag Coat of arms

- Location in Rio Grande do Sul and Brazil
- Coordinates: 27°42′52″S 52°25′15″W
- Country: Brazil
- Region: South
- State: Rio Grande do Sul
- Established: 14 April

Government
  - Mayor: Pedro Lorenzi (PV)

Area
  - Total: 148.184 km^{2} (57.214 sq mi)
- Elevation: 160 m (520 ft)

Population (2020)
  - Total: 2,299
  - Density: 15.4/km^{2} (40/sq mi)
- Time zone: UTC−3 (BRT)
- HDI (2010): 0.710 – high
- Website: www.paulobento.rs.gov.br

Paulo Bento is a municipality that is located in the state of Rio Grande do Sul, Brazil.

== History ==
The name Paulo Bento owes its origin to the Bento and Souza brothers, a family that settled on a tract of land stretching from the Cravo River to the Erechim field around 1890. Later, João Barbosa acquired the land stretching from the Bento family's property to the border with Barão de Cotegipe, where the first German immigrants settled. In 1928, the village was planned by surveyor Oscar César with wide streets, 12 blocks, and 26 farms.

== See also ==
- List of municipalities in Rio Grande do Sul
