= Três Arroios =

Brazilian municipality

Coordinates: 27°29′S 52°11′W

- Municipality
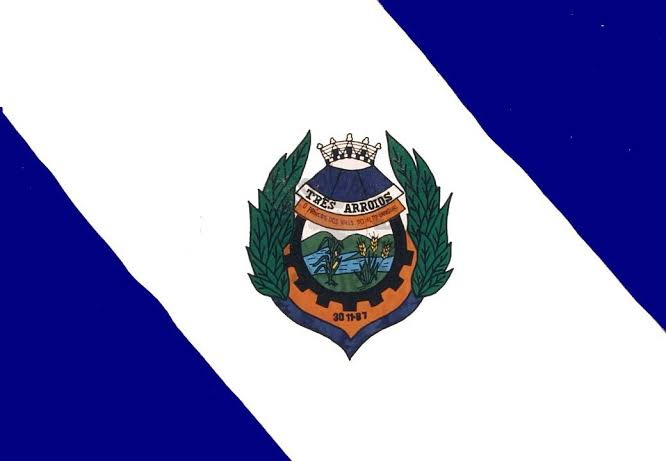
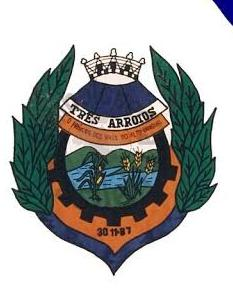
- Flag Coat of arms
- Interactive map of Três Arroios
- Country: Brazil
- Time zone: UTC−3 (BRT)

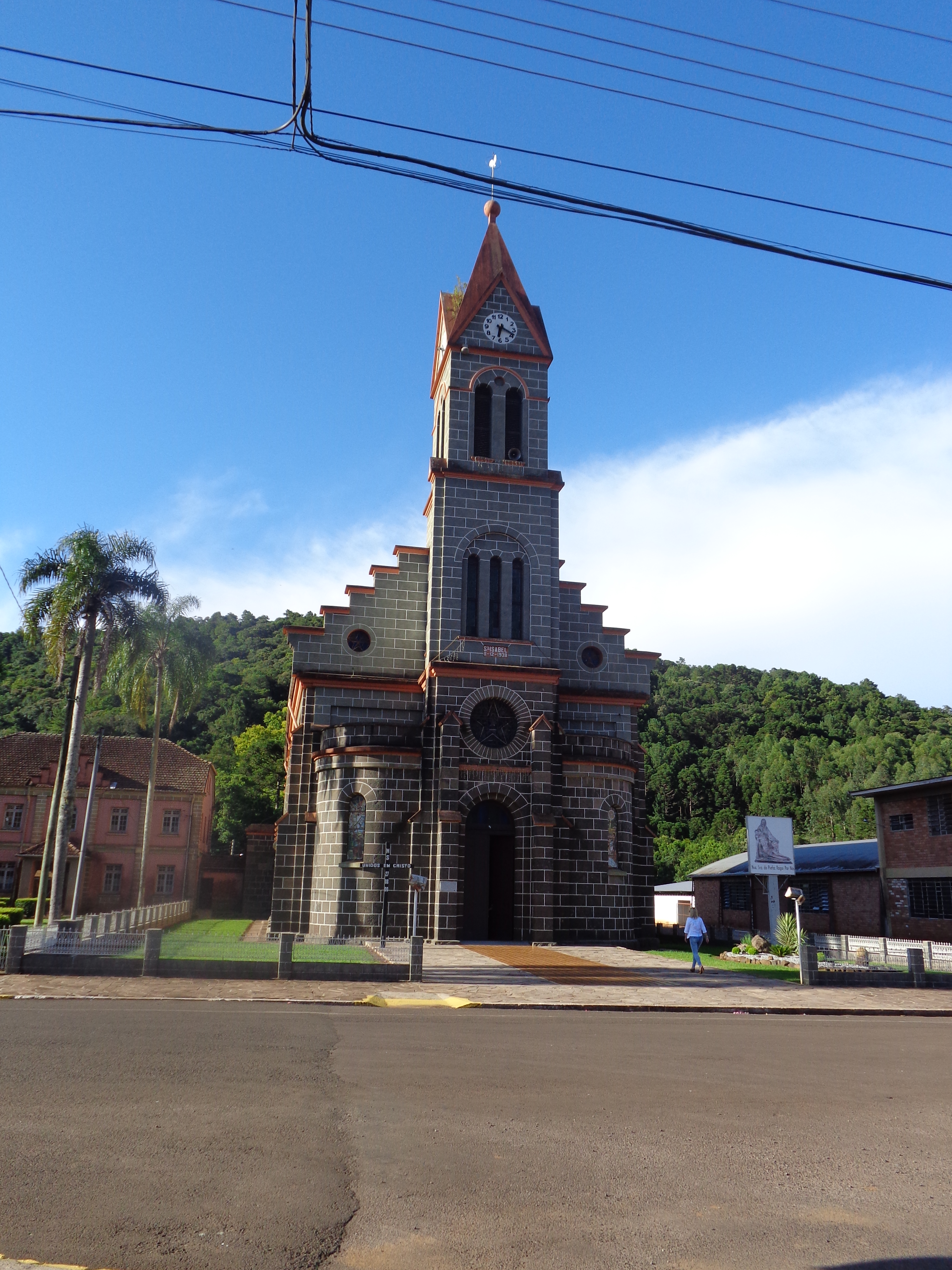
Mother Church of Três Arroios.

Três Arroios is a municipality in the state of Rio Grande do Sul, Brazil. As of 2020, the estimated population was 2,643.

== See also ==
- List of municipalities in Rio Grande do Sul
