= Barão de Cotegipe =

Municipality in Rio Grande do Sul, Brazil

Coordinates: 27°37′S 52°23′W

- Municipality
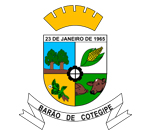
- Flag Coat of arms
- Interactive map of Barão de Cotegipe
- Country: Brazil
- Time zone: UTC−3 (BRT)

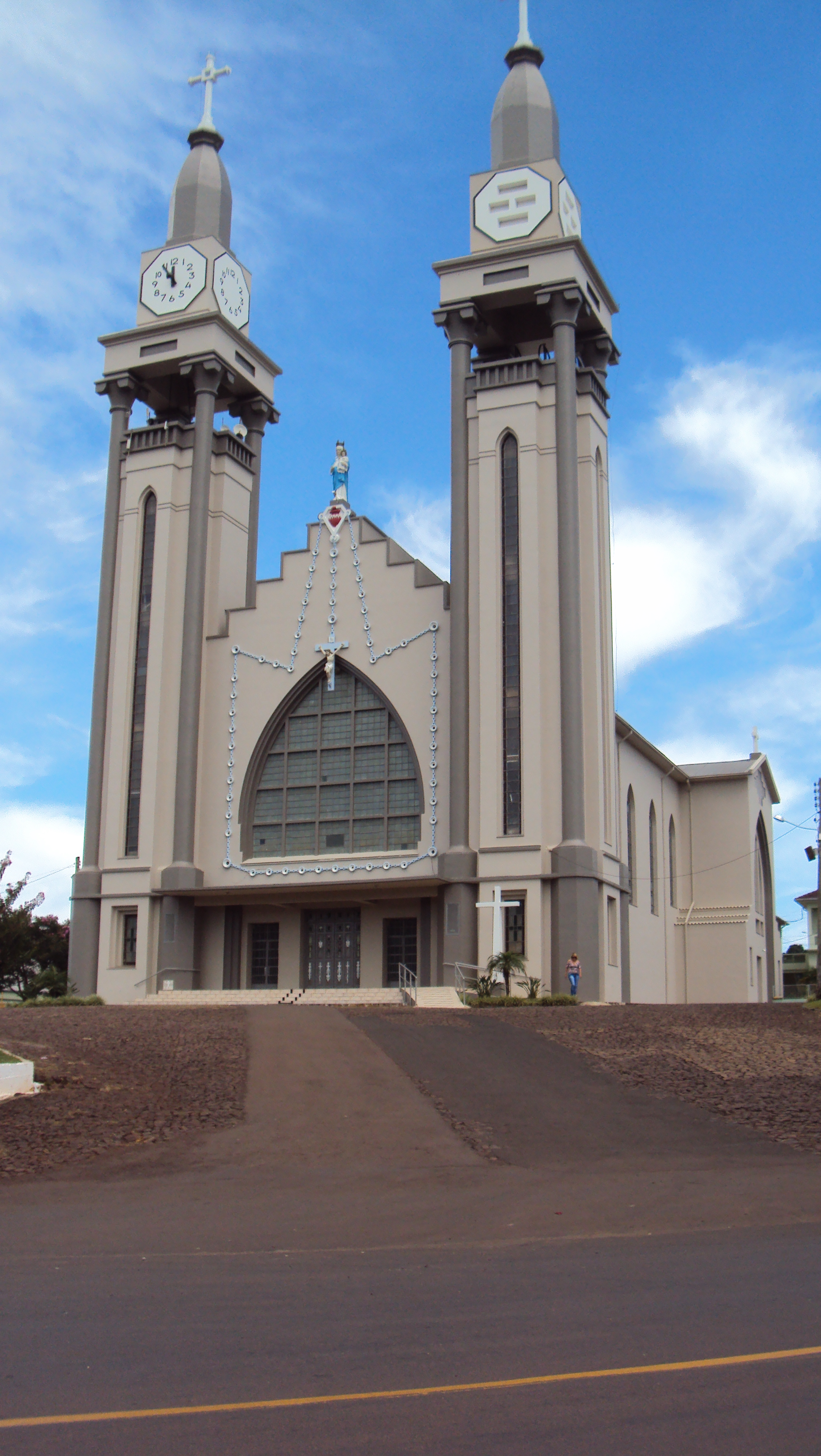
Parish Church of Barão de Cotegipe.

Barão de Cotegipe is a municipality in the state of Rio Grande do Sul, Brazil. As of 2022, the estimated population was 7,144.

== See also ==
- List of municipalities in Rio Grande do Sul
