= Viadutos =

Municipality in Rio Grande do Sul, Brazil

Coordinates: 27°34′S 52°01′W

- Municipality
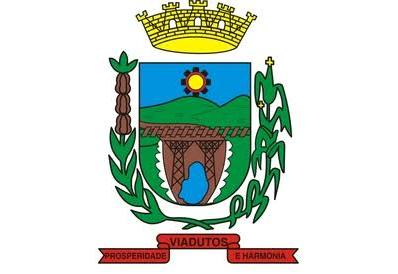
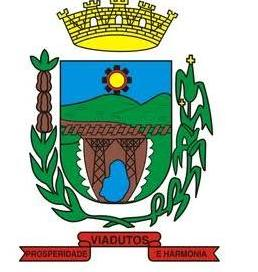
- Flag Coat of arms
- Interactive map of Viadutos
- Country: Brazil
- Time zone: UTC−3 (BRT)

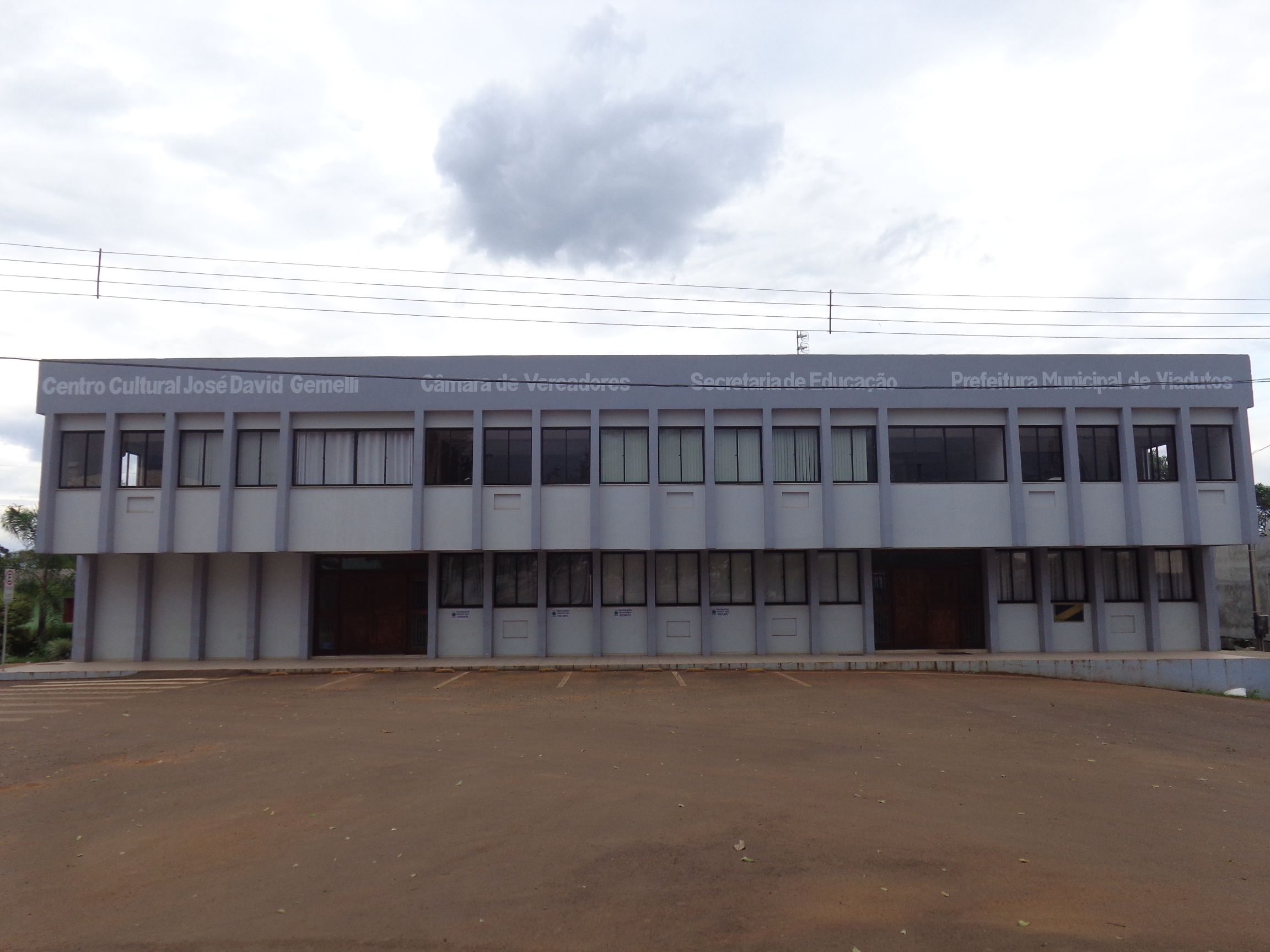

Viadutos is a municipality in the state of Rio Grande do Sul, Brazil. As of 2020, the estimated population was 4,690.

== See also ==
- List of municipalities in Rio Grande do Sul
