= Quatro Irmãos =

Municipality of Rio Grande do Sul, Brazil

- Municipality
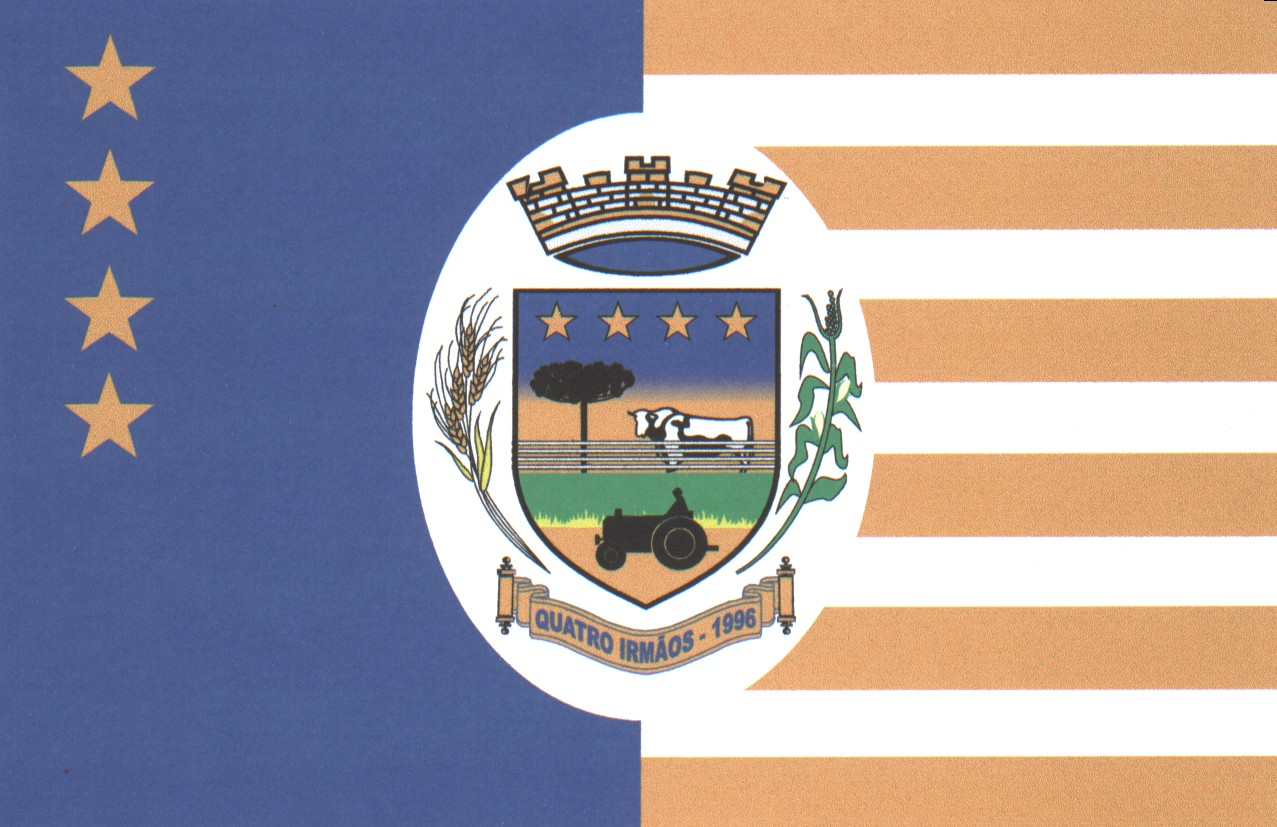
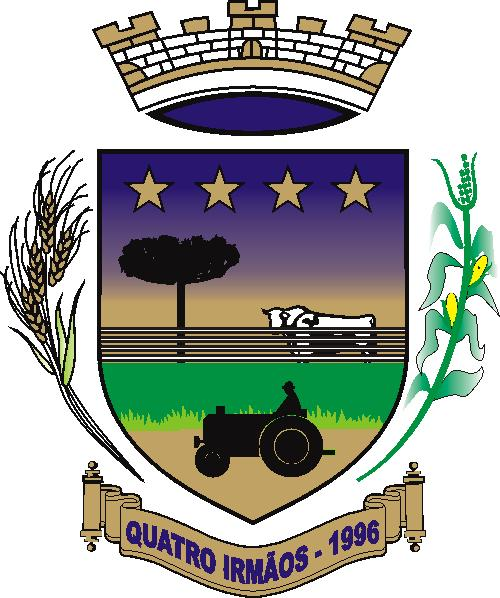
- Flag Coat of arms

- Location in Brazil
- Coordinates: 27°49′15″S 52°26′20″W
- Country: Brazil
- Region: Southern
- State: Rio Grande do Sul
- Mesoregion: Noroeste Rio-Grandense

Government
  - Mayor: Giovan Poganski (2021-Present)

Population (2020)
  - Total: 1,856
- Time zone: UTC−3 (BRT)
- Postal code: 99720-000
- Website: quatroirmaos.rs.gov.br

Quatro Irmãos is a municipality in the state of Rio Grande do Sul in the Southern Region of Brazil.

== See also ==
- List of municipalities in Rio Grande do Sul
