= Gaurama =

Municipality in Rio Grande do Sul, Brazil

- Municipality of Rio Grande do Sul, Brazil
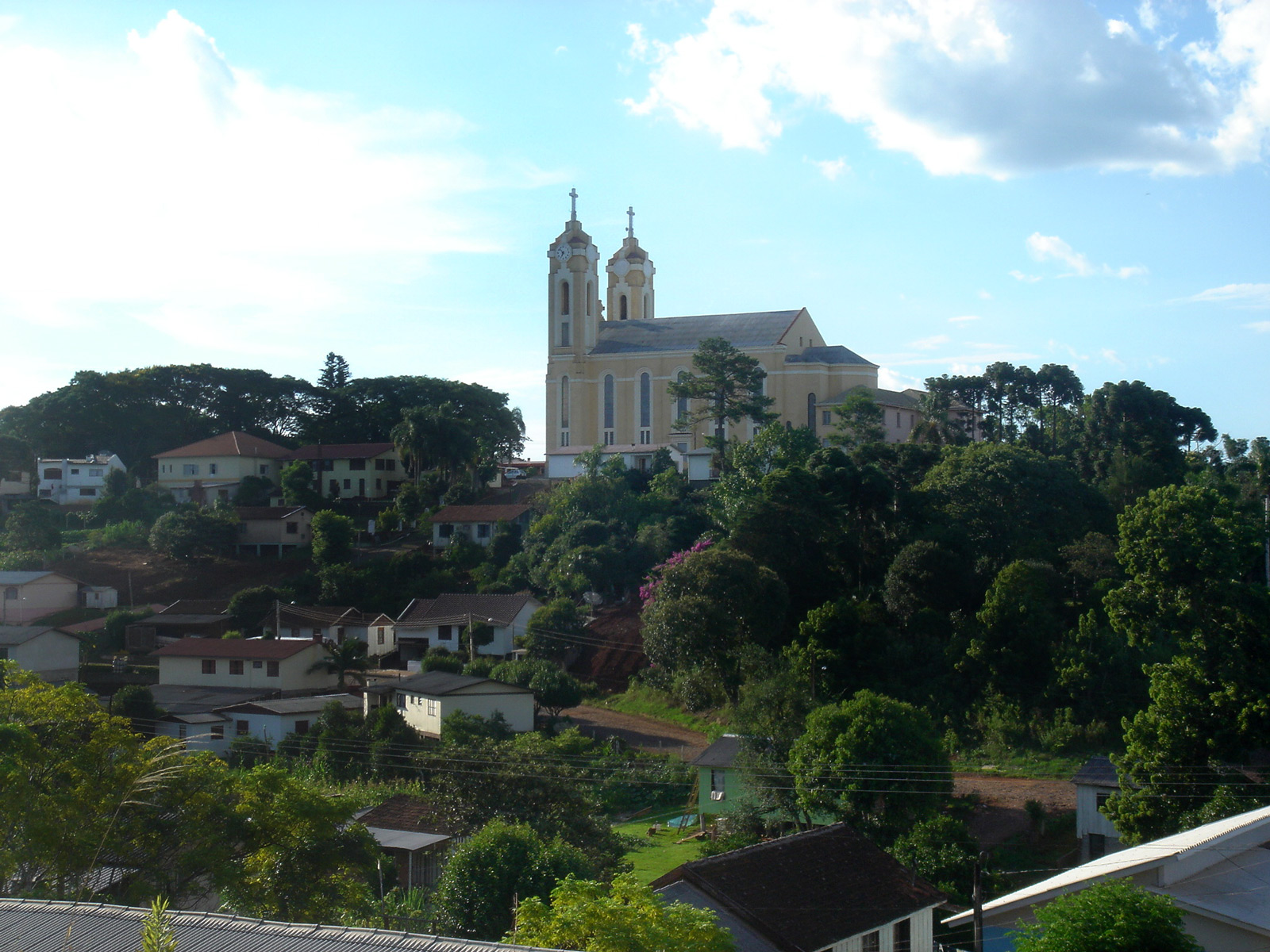
- View of Gaurama with the St. Louis Gonzaga Parish Church

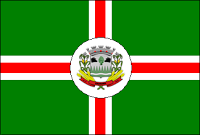
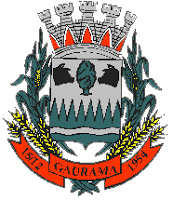
- Flag Coat of arms
- Etymology: "Land of clay" in the Tupi–Guarani languages
- Location of Gaurama in Rio Grande do Sul

- Location within Brazil Location within South America
- Coordinates: 27°35′2″S 52°5′38″W
- Country: Brazil
- Region: South
- State: Rio Grande do Sul
- Founded: 15 December 1954

Government
  - Mayor: Eliezer Vagner Zanatta (PSD) (2025-2028)
  - Vice Mayor: Gilmar José Saccomori (MDB) (2025-2028)

Area
  - Total: 204.428 km^{2} (78.930 sq mi)
- Elevation: 764 m (2,507 ft)

Population (2022)
  - Total: 5,665
  - Density: 27.71/km^{2} (71.8/sq mi)
- Demonym: Gauramense (Brazilian Portuguese)
- Time zone: UTC-03:00 (Brasília Time)
- Postal code: 99830-000, 99833-000
- HDI (2010): 0.738 – high
- Website: gaurama.rs.gov.br

Gaurama is a municipality in the state of Rio Grande do Sul, Brazil. As of 2020, the estimated population was 5,489.

== Gallery ==
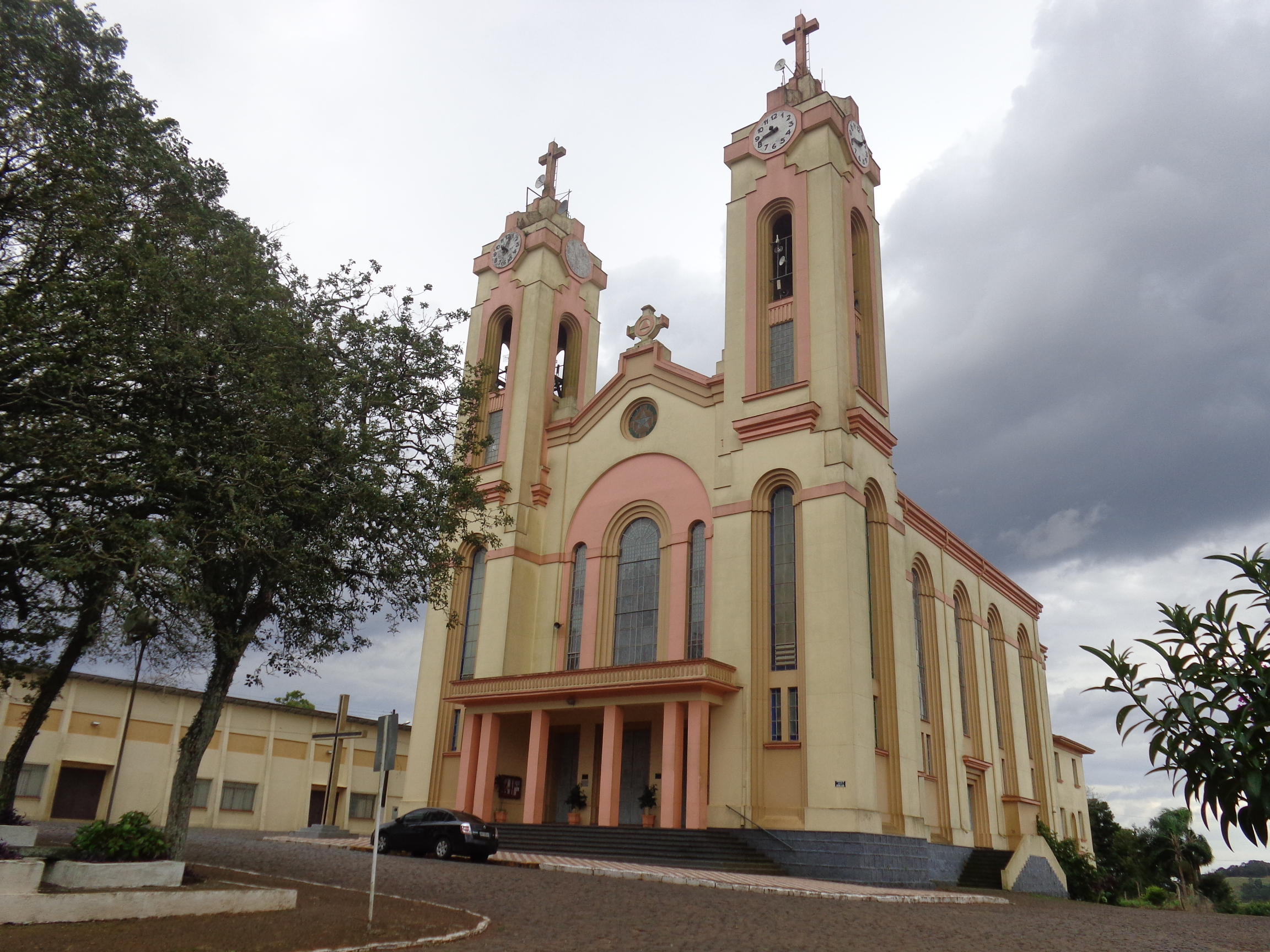
St. Louis Gonzaga Parish Church

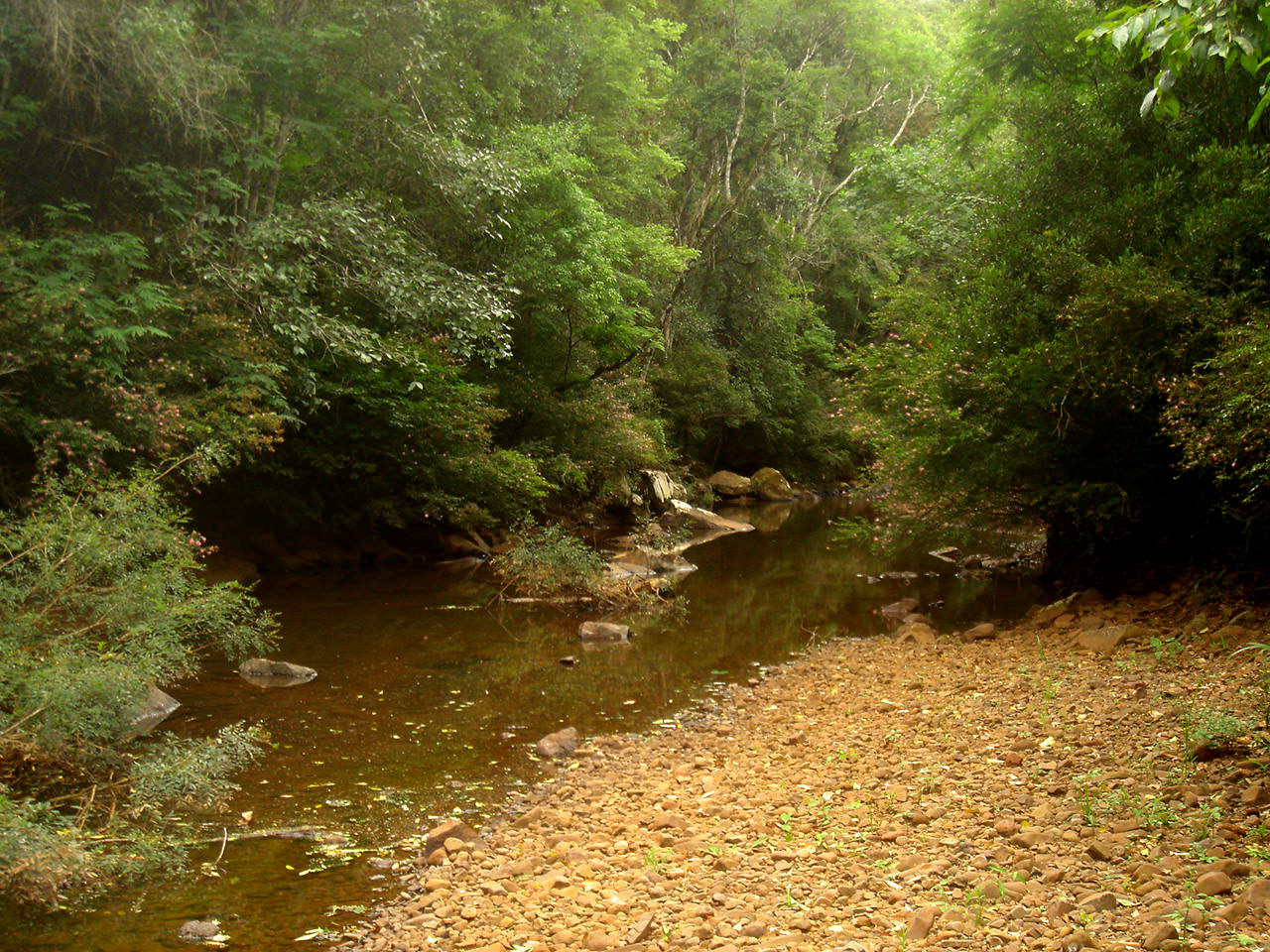
River in Gaurama

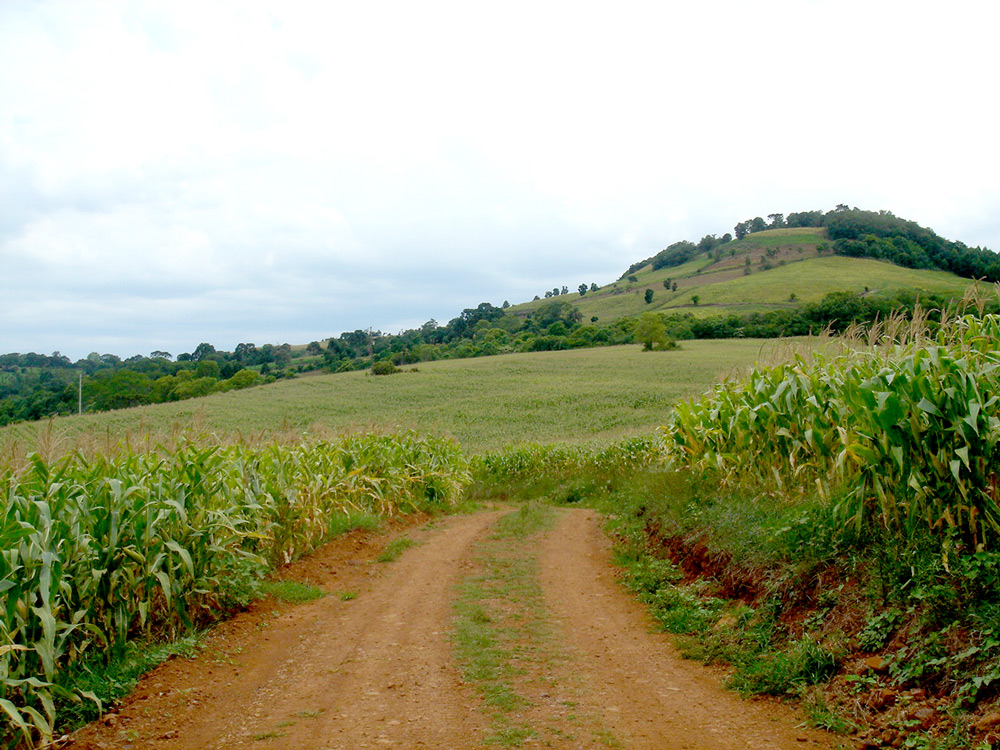
Cornfield in Gaurama

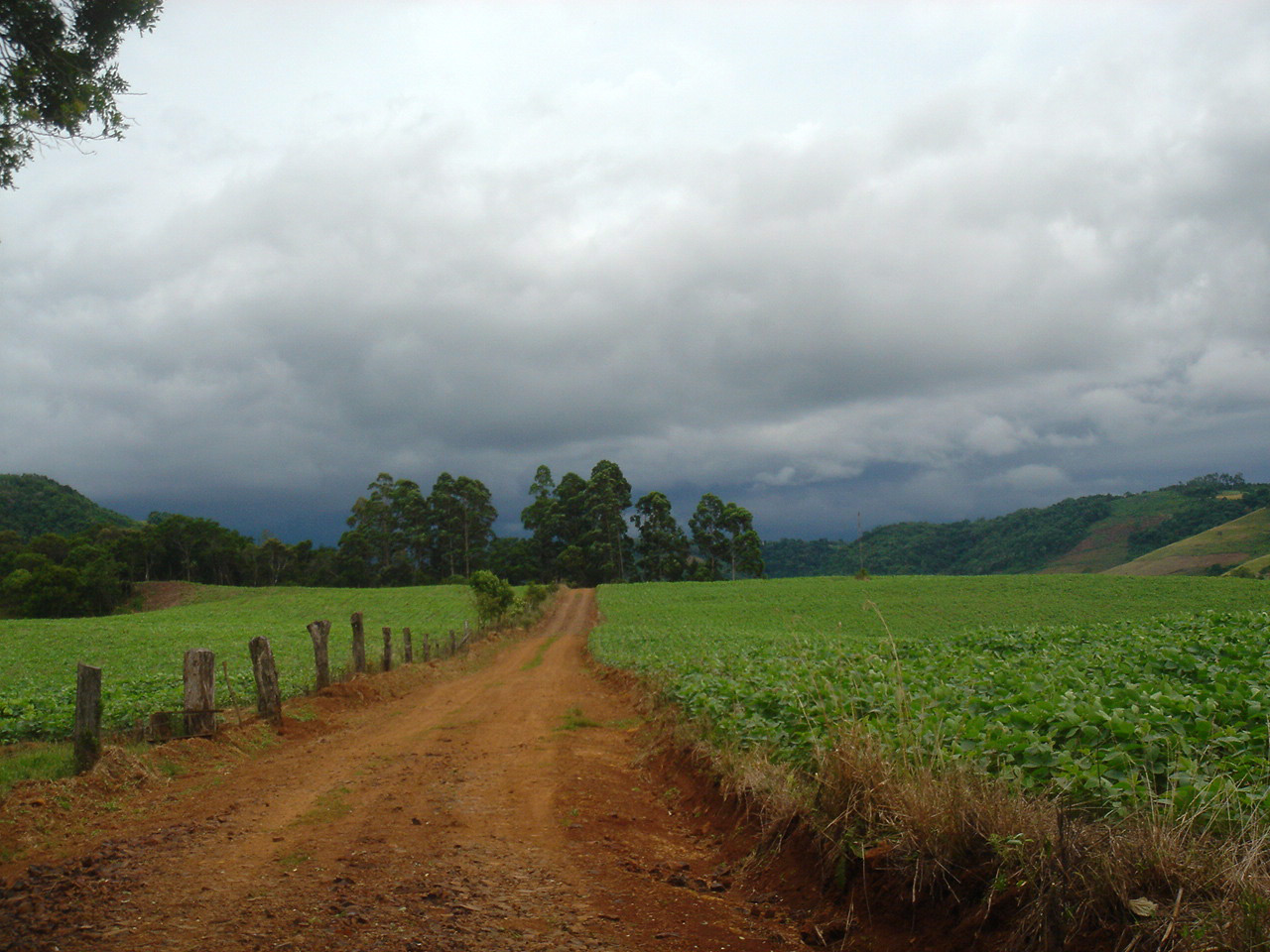
Countryside of Gaurama

== See also ==
- List of municipalities in Rio Grande do Sul
