= UBC (disambiguation) =

UBC most commonly refers to the University of British Columbia, a public university in Canada.

- University of British Columbia Vancouver
- University of British Columbia Okanagan

UBC may also refer to:

== Broadcasting ==
- UBC Media Group, a radio services company in London, UK
- UBC Media Incorporated
- Ukrainian Business Channel, a Ukrainian television channel
- Uganda Broadcasting Corporation, the state broadcaster
  - UBC Television, a Ugandan television channel
- Ulsan Broadcasting Corporation, a radio and television station in Ulsan, South Korea
- United Broadcasting Company, UBC was a US radio network
- United Broadcasting Corporation, a cable television company in Thailand

== Businesses and organizations ==
=== Businesses ===
- Unclaimed Baggage Center, a retail store in Scottsboro, Alabama
- Union Bank of California, in the United States
- Union Bank of Colombo, in Sri Lanka
- Union Banking Corporation, a former bank in the United States
- United Bank Card, a payment and transaction processor in Pennsylvania

=== Other organizations ===
- Union of the Baltic Cities, a cross-border cooperation organization in the Baltic Sea region
- United Baptist Convention, a generic term for certain ministries in the United Baptist tradition
- United Brotherhood of Carpenters and Joiners of America, a trade union in Canada and the United States
- University Baptist Church (disambiguation)

== Science and technology ==
- Ubiquitin C, a human gene
- Ubiquitin-conjugating enzyme
- Unipolar brush cell, a class of excitatory glutamatergic interneuron

== Sport ==
- Union Boat Club, a rowing and sports club in Boston, Massachusetts
- United Basketball Conference, a college basketball scheduling alliance
- University Barge Club, an amateur rowing club in Philadelphia, Pennsylvania
- Ustinov Boat Club, the rowing club of Ustinov College at Durham University in England

== Other uses ==
- Ambala City railway station
- Uncorrectable block count, number of blocks that cannot be corrected with an error correction algorithm
- Unified Braille Code, an English Braille code
- Uniform Building Code, a model building code
- United Business Center
- Universal background check, a regularly debated topic in gun politics in the United States
