= Business as usual =

Business as usual may refer to:

- Business as usual (business), the normal execution of operations within an organization
- Business as usual (policy), policy of the British government in World War I

== Film, television and theatre ==
- Business as Usual (film), 1987 British drama directed by Lezli-An Barrett
- "Business as Usual" (Haven), 24th episode of American-Canadian TV series Haven
- "Business as Usual" (Star Trek: Deep Space Nine), 116th episode of the television series Star Trek: Deep Space Nine
- "Business as Usual", 14th episode of TV series Flashpoint

== Music ==
- Business as Usual (EPMD album), 1990 album by Hip Hop duo EPMD
- Business as Usual (Haystak & Jelly Roll album), 2013 album by rappers Haystak and Jelly Roll
- Business as Usual (Men at Work album), 1981 album by Australian new wave band Men at Work
- Business as Usual (Secret Affair album), 1982 album by mod revival band Secret Affair
- Business as Usual, 2006 album by Boo-Yaa T.R.I.B.E.
- Business as Usual, 2006 album by Da Brakes
- Business as Usual, 2024 album by The LaFontaines
- Business as Usual, 1999 album by Robin McAuley
- "Business as Usual", song by The Eagles from Long Road Out of Eden
- "Business as Usual", song by Little Feat from Let It Roll
- "Business as Usual", song by Staggered Crossing from Last Summer When We Were Famous

== See also ==
- Politics as usual (disambiguation)
- Business (disambiguation)
- Bau (disambiguation)
