= Bau (surname) =

- Alexander Bau (born 17 April 1970) is a German luger
- Ángeles Moreno Bau (born 1968) is a Spanish diplomat
- Eder Baù, Italian footballer
- Dogodo Bau (born 5 December 1994) is a cricketer from Papua New Guinea
- Gabriel Bau (15 August 1892 – 7 October 1944), was a Spanish footballer
- Hsin Bau (born 1964), Taiwanese Buddhist monk and elder of the Fo Guang Shan worldwide
- Joseph Bau (1920–2002), Polish-born Israeli artist, philosopher, inventor, animator, comedian, commercial creator, copy-writer, poet, Holocaust survivor
- Juan Bau (Aldaia; 24 December 1948) is the stage name of Juan Bautista Conca Moya, a Spanish light music singer.
- Luiz Baú (born June 21, 1939), Brazilian serial killer
- Martin Bau (born 8 October 1994) is a Slovenian swimmer
- Mathias Bau Hansen (born 3 July 1993) is a Danish professional ice hockey
- Mia Bau Hansen, Danish ice hockey player
- Nicholas B. La Bau (July 29, 1823 – November 1, 1873) was an American lawyer and politician
- Ophélie Bau is a French actress
- Sabine Bau (born 19 July 1969) is a former German foil fencer.
- Sese Bau (born 23 June 1992) is a Papua New Guinean cricketer
- Stefy Bau is an Italian former professional motocross and supercross racer.
