= Human rights in the Democratic Republic of the Congo =

In areas of the Democratic Republic of the Congo, the human rights record has remained considerably poor, and serious abuses have been committed. Unlawful killings, disappearances, torture, rape, and arbitrary arrest and detention by security forces increased during the year, and the transitional government took few actions to punish harsh people. Harsh and life-threatening conditions in prison and detention facilities; prolonged pre-trial detention; lack of an independent and effective judiciary; and arbitrary interference with privacy, family, and home also remained serious problems. Security forces continued to recruit and retain child soldiers and to compel forced labour by adults and children.

They also continued to abuse freedom of the press, particularly during the election campaign. Also during the campaign, broadcast stations owned by the former Vice President Jean-Pierre Bemba promoted ethnic hatred. The transitional government continued to restrict freedoms of assembly and movement; government corruption remained pervasive; and security forces restricted non-governmental organizations (NGOs). In addition, societal discrimination against women and ethnic minorities, trafficking in persons, child labor, and lack of protection for workers' rights continued to be pervasive throughout the country.

In 2006 the country held its first democratic national elections in more than 40 years. More than 70 percent of registered voters participated in the first round of elections, and more than 65 percent participated in the second round. A freely elected National Assembly took office September 24. In addition, during the year the transitional government supported prosecution of serious human rights abuses. It transferred a former militia leader to the International Criminal Court (ICC) to face charges of recruitment of child soldiers, and a military court sentenced seven soldiers to life imprisonment for crimes against humanity.

== Respect for the integrity of the person ==
=== Arbitrary or unlawful deprivation of life ===
In 2006, transitional government security forces committed numerous unlawful killings with impunity. According to MONUC, the FARDC and the national police (PNC) committed two-thirds of all unlawful killings in the country. During the first six months of that year, members of the FARDC allegedly killed more than 50 civilians, and PNC officers allegedly killed at least 10.

In 2020, illegal armed groups were reported to have killed at least 1,315 civilians in six months, while the SSF killed 155 civilians in conflict-affected zones; these numbers are less than in the previous year.

==== Instances of violence in 2006 include ====
On January 22 in Kagaba, Ituri District, FARDC soldiers of the Fourth and Sixth Integrated Brigades allegedly shot several civilians, killing seven men, four women, and two children, and wounding two others as they attended Sunday mass. No action was taken against the soldiers.

On June 26 a FARDC commandant in Kongolo, Tanganyika District, allegedly killed a member of the Federation of Congolese Enterprises after the victim refused to pay money demanded by the commandant to buy a motorbike.

In Butembo, North Kivu Province, on July 18, FARDC soldiers of the Second Integrated Brigade allegedly killed a civilian who attempted, with others, to stop soldiers from extorting money from them.

In Fataki, Ituri District, a drunken FARDC soldier shot and killed two election workers during vote counting on October 30. The families of the victims destroyed part of nine polling centers in retribution. A military court sentenced the soldier to death.

Transitional government security forces killed suspects during apprehension or while holding them in custody.

For example, a FARDC commander in the Ituri District town of Dii arrested 19 suspects in a murder case and detained them at a military camp on January 22. One detainee allegedly died of severe mistreatment while in detention.

An elderly man in the North Kivu Province town of Kilindera died in custody on March 22, one day after military prosecutors arrested him in an attempt to force him to pay a fine. The soldiers in charge of the jail allegedly kicked him, beat him with truncheons and ropes, and forced him to march 32 miles until he died.

On September 26, guards at Kinshasa's main prison allegedly opened fire on prisoners while attempting to force them to return to their cells, killing five and wounding several others. The prisoners had rioted in reaction to a prohibition on visits by family members. There were no reports of authorities taking action against the guards involved.

Transitional government security forces killed demonstrators while attempting to disperse them (see section 2.b.).

Transitional government security forces committed other killings, including some involving beatings and excessive force, killings during election-related clashes, and accidental killings.

For example, in the South Kivu Province town of Panzi, three FARDC soldiers allegedly attempting to intimidate a civilian by firing into the air accidentally shot him in the chest, killing him on June 8.

In the Équateur Province town of Bumba, a mob burned 32 polling stations on October 29 after bullets fired by security forces attempting to restore order accidentally killed a 15-year-old boy and wounded another person. The incident occurred after security forces responded to a crowd beating the president of a voting center, who they believed had stuffed ballot boxes. There were no reports of authorities taking action against the security personnel involved.

From August 19–22, fighting in Kinshasa between guard forces loyal to Vice President Bemba and security forces loyal to President Laurent Kabila resulted in the deaths of 23 people, including several civilians. Renewed clashes on November 11 resulted in the deaths of four people, including three civilians.

Fighting in the east between armed groups and the army displaced thousands of civilians, limited humanitarian access to vulnerable populations, and resulted in or contributed to hundreds of civilian deaths, many from illness and starvation (see section 1.g.).

Colonel Simba Hussein, who was sentenced to death for killing a civilian who refused to change the colonel's tire in July 2005, was transferred to a prison in another province, from which he was paroled during the year. There were unconfirmed reports that he had returned to active service by year's end.

Unidentified armed men killed a journalist and may have been politically motivated (see section 2.a).

Unlike in the previous year, there were no reports that unidentified armed men in uniform forcibly entered personal residences in Kinshasa at night to harass civilians, loot personal belongings, or kill persons involved in personal feuds.

Armed groups operating outside government control committed killings of civilians, and summary executions (see section 1.g.).

During the year mob violence resulted in deaths; crowds that gathered in public places killed civilians and soldiers.

For example, on July 27, participants in a Kinshasa campaign rally for Vice President and Movement for the Liberation of Congo (MLC) presidential candidate Bemba killed a civilian, two soldiers, and three police officers, including one by burning him alive. The mob injured 20 other police officers, looted the offices of the High Authority for Media (HAM) and the National Observatory for Human Rights (ONDH), gang raped at least one woman, and destroyed two churches and several houses. Subsequent investigation by the ONDH assigned full blame to the MLC for the incident. An MLC spokesman alleged the police victims had died in a car accident.

Civilians killed members of the security forces for allegedly committing serious crimes during the year. A mob in Mbuji Mayi, in Eastern Kasai Province, burned a policeman to death on March 21 for allegedly shooting and stabbing a civilian while attempting to rob the civilian as part of an armed gang.

On August 2, a mob of 2,000 persons in the North Kivu Province town of Katwiguru burned alive a police officer who allegedly killed a civilian while attempting to extort money from him.

During the year parents and relatives, as well as other adults, killed children accused of sorcery.

A father in the Equateur Province town of Zongo threw his five-month-old baby into a river in September for alleged sorcery. Days earlier adults in the provincial capital of Mbandaka threw a 15-year-old boy in the river for sorcery. Police made arrests in both cases.

By year's end no prosecutions had taken place against individuals who burned to death children accused of sorcery in Mbuji Mayi, Eastern Kasai Province in 2005.

=== Disappearance ===
In 2020 there were reports of disappearances attributable to the SSF.

=== Torture and other cruel, inhuman, or degrading treatment or punishment ===
Instances of violence in 2006 include;

On June 12, 2006, the transitional government promulgated a new law criminalizing torture; however, during that year security services continued to torture civilians, particularly detainees and prisoners. There were unconfirmed reports that members of the security services tortured or abused civilians to settle personal disputes. Authorities had taken no known action against the soldiers who committed the abuses described below by year's end.

In 2006, FARDC soldiers allegedly tortured a diamond digger in Mbuji Mayi, Eastern Kasai Province on March 13. Three soldiers took the digger to a cell, suspended him upside down from an electrified post, and beat him for two hours to extract the names of ex-military groups illegally working in the concession of the Mine of Bakwanga (MIBA) diamond parastatal. Republican Guard (GR) troops arbitrarily arrested and tortured 84 fishermen in Equateur Province on August 24. The soldiers allegedly stripped, trampled, and beat the men before locking them in an underground cell in inhuman conditions for three days. They also confiscated the fishermen's voting cards.

In 2006, GR Lieutenant Mukalayi accused a man in Kinshasa of denouncing the head of state and demanded $50 (26,500 Congolese francs) as a "fine." When the man failed to pay, soldiers took him to a military camp, demanded to know if he supported opposition groups, and reportedly struck him fifty times until he began to hemorrhage internally. A police officer in Kindu, Maniema Province arbitrarily arrested a civilian working on the political campaign of the minister of the interior. They allegedly beat the civilian seriously on his face and genitals. The officer worked for the governor, a political opponent of the minister. No known action had been taken against the soldiers by year's end.

In 2006, human rights organizations reported that police and soldiers commonly abused homeless children, stole their possessions, and paid for sex or raped them. According to Human Rights Watch (HRW), police extorted bribes from gangs of street youths to prevent harassment and colluded with them in crime and prostitution. Political groups encouraged and paid homeless children and youth gangs to disrupt public order. Members of the naval and police forces committed mass rape in the Equateur province towns of Ganda, Likako, and Likundju on March 18. They allegedly raped 34 women and three girls, attempted to rape nine others, tortured 50 civilians, and looted 120 houses.

==== Prisons and detention center conditions ====
A report in 2006 noted that;

Conditions in most large prisons were harsh and life-threatening. During the year an unknown number of persons died in prisons due to neglect; MONUC reports indicated that at least one person died each month in prisons in the country. The penal system continued to suffer from severe shortages of funds, and most prisons were severely overcrowded, in poor a state of repair, lacked sanitation facilities, or were not designed to be used as detention facilities. Health care and medical attention remained inadequate and infectious diseases were rampant. In rare cases, prison doctors provided care; however, they often lacked medicines and supplies.

In several prisons, the government has not provided food for many years. Many prisoners starved to death; food remained inadequate and malnutrition widespread. In general, prisoners' families and friends were the only source of food and other necessities. Prisoners with no one to provide food were particularly at risk. Local NGOs reported that authorities sometimes moved prisoners without telling families, making the provision of food difficult or impossible. Prison staff often forced family members to pay bribes to bring food to prisoners.

Larger prisons sometimes had separate facilities for women and juveniles, but others generally did not. Male prisoners raped other prisoners, including men, women, and children, according to numerous credible reports. Prison officials held pretrial detainees together with convicted prisoners and treated both groups the same. They generally held individuals detained on state security grounds in special sections. Government security services often clandestinely transferred such prisoners to secret prisons. Civilian and military prisons and detention facilities held soldiers and civilians alike.

Harsher conditions existed in small detention facilities. These facilities were overcrowded and generally intended for short-term pretrial detention; in practice they were often used for lengthy stays. Detention center authorities often arbitrarily beat or tortured detainees. These facilities usually had no toilets, mattresses, or medical care, and detainees often received insufficient amounts of light, air, and water. The centers generally operated without dedicated funding and with minimal regulation or oversight. Detention center authorities or influential individuals frequently barred visitors or severely mistreated detainees. Guards frequently extorted bribes from family members and NGOs to visit detainees or provide food and other necessities.

The security services, particularly the intelligence services and the GR, continued to operate numerous illegal detention facilities characterized by extremely harsh and life-threatening conditions. Members of government security services regularly abused, beat, and tortured detainees incarcerated there, sometimes fatally (see sections 1.a and 1.g). Authorities routinely denied access to family members, friends, and lawyers.

According to MONUC, military jails had makeshift cells, including some that were located underground, that held military and sometimes civilian detainees. MONUC confirmed multiple cases of torture in detention centers run by security services. These facilities lacked adequate food and water, toilets, mattresses, and medical care, and authorities routinely denied prisoners access to their families, friends, and lawyers.

According to a March 16 MONUC report on arrests and detentions in prisons, government security forces and prison officials routinely violated prisoners' and detainees' rights. Security forces lacking legal detention authority often arrested and detained individuals. Despite a presidential decision to close illegal jails operated by the military or other security forces, none were closed during the year. The report found that 70 to 80 percent of detained persons did not see a judge for months or years, if ever.

According to the law, minors should be detained only as a last resort; however, in part due to the absence of juvenile justice or education centers, detention of minors was common. Many children endured pretrial detention as delinquents without seeing a judge, lawyer, or social worker; for orphaned children, pretrial detention often continued for months or years.

In March 2006 Amnesty International (AI) visited the Provincial Inspectorship of Kinshasa, one of the main police detention centers in the city. Out of 100 prisoners visited by AI, more than 20 showed signs of ill-treatment, including open - and sometimes fresh - wounds on legs, arms, and heads; cigarette burns; and friction burns on wrists. These prisoners had received no medical care. They allegedly were daily tied to pillars, beaten with sticks and bricks, and kicked. Those inflicting the abuse regularly demanded money. Prison officials refused AI access to the room where the abuses allegedly occurred. The deputy commander of the prison claimed no knowledge of the abuse.

In general, the government allowed the International Committee of the Red Cross (ICRC), MONUC, and some NGOs access to all official detention facilities; however, it did not allow these organizations access to illegal detention facilities.

=== Arbitrary arrest or detention ===
The law prohibits arbitrary arrest and detention; however, government security forces arbitrarily arrested and detained persons, including journalists, activists, and politicians who have criticized the government, the president, or the SSF.

==== Role of the police and security apparatus ====
A report in 2006 noted that;

The security forces consist of the PNC, including the Rapid Intervention Police unit and the Integrated Police Unit, which has primary responsibility for law enforcement and maintaining public order and is part of the Ministry of Interior; the immigration service, also in the Ministry of the Interior; the National Intelligence Agency (ANR), which is overseen by the president's national security advisor and is responsible for internal and external security; the military intelligence service of the Ministry of Defense; the director general of migrations, responsible for border control; the GR, which reports directly to the presidency; and the FARDC, which is part of the Ministry of Defense and is generally responsible for external security, but also has limited internal security responsibilities.

The overall level of police professionalism increased noticeably during 2006; for example, recently trained police showed considerable restraint during the July 27 violence in Kinshasa that resulted in the death of several members of the security forces (see section 1.a). However, military forces generally remained ineffective, lacked training, received little pay, and were vulnerable to corruption.

During 2006 members of the police, military, and other security forces attacked, detained, robbed, and extorted money from civilians. According to HRW, some police officers colluded with petty criminals and prostitutes for a share of their earnings. The transitional government prosecuted and disciplined some violators; however, the vast majority acted with impunity. Although mechanisms existed to investigate violations by police, the police used them only sporadically.

==== Arrest and detention ====
A report in 2006 noted that;

Under the law, certain police officers and senior security officers are authorized to order arrests. Offenses punishable by more than six months' imprisonment require warrants. Detainees must appear before a magistrate within 48 hours. Those arrested must be informed of their rights, must be told why they were arrested, and must not be arrested in place of a family member. They may not be arrested for nonpenal offenses, such as debt and civil offenses. Arrested individuals must also be allowed to contact their families and consult with attorneys. In practice, security officials routinely violated all of these requirements.

In 2006, police often arbitrarily arrested and detained persons without filing charges, often to extort money from family members. Authorities rarely pressed charges in a timely manner and often created contrived or overly vague charges. No functioning bail system existed, and detainees had little access to legal counsel if unable to pay. Incommunicado detention was common; security forces regularly held suspects before acknowledging their detention or allowing them contact with family or counsel.

Government security forces used the pretext of state security to arbitrarily arrest individuals. They arrested and detained individuals in the name of state security and frequently held them without charge, presentation of evidence, access to a lawyer, or due process.

In 2006, MONUC report found widespread illegal arrest and detention of minors, particularly street children and children associated with armed groups. Although the recruitment or retention of child soldiers is illegal, military authorities sometimes arrested demobilized child soldiers on charges of desertion and tried them in military courts. Civilian courts on occasion tried child soldiers for possessing illegal arms, even though they had been illegally recruited as combatants.

In June security forces in Mbuji Mayi, Eastern Kasai Province arrested for arms possession and arbitrarily detained 12 supporters of the Union for Democracy and Social Progress (UDPS) political party (see section 3).

In 2006, GR soldiers arrested two aides to presidential candidate Mbuyi Kalala Alfuele on July 30. The soldiers allegedly blindfolded, handcuffed, and detained the aides at an unknown location until releasing them without charge the following day.

In 2006, police apprehended 600 adults whom they accused of participating in politically inspired gang violence in Kinshasa. They also detained 180 minors, including 20 younger than five years old apprehended with their mothers. According to MONUC, the police held them without adequate shelter, food, or water. Human rights organizations arranged for children under 15 to be released to their parents. At least 130 people, including women and children, remained in custody for more than a month without charge. Authorities released all the remaining detainees by year's end on the order of a Kinshasa judge.

In 2006, police in Kinshasa detained without charge 250 homeless adults and 87 minors, all alleged street gang members, following a gun battle between security forces and Vice President Bemba's troops the day before. The adults were transported to rural areas for forced agricultural work under a national service program; the children were released to local NGOs.

Many individuals arrested experienced prolonged pretrial detention, often ranging from months to years. MONUC reported that 70 to 80 percent of detainees nationwide were in pretrial detention. Prison officials often held individuals long after their sentences had expired due to disorganization, judicial inefficiency, or corruption. In several instances when NGOs or MONUC brought cases to the attention of the government, prison officials released them. Armed groups operating outside government control in parts of the east sometimes detained civilians, often for ransom.

==== Amnesty ====
In November 2005 the National Assembly passed a law granting amnesty to individuals accused of war crimes and political offenses committed between August 1996 and June 2003. A December 2005 Supreme Court ruling excluded amnesty for individuals allegedly involved in the assassination of then president Laurent Kabila, which the ruling identified as a criminal, rather than political, act.

Annie Kalumbu, jailed since 2001 for allegedly plotting against Laurent Kabila, left prison under amnesty in 2006. According to African Association for the Defense of Human Rights (ASADHO), she began receiving death threats February 22 and went into hiding. Her whereabouts were unknown. MONUC and the local NGO VSV alleged that at least one other individual accused of plotting against Laurent Kabila long before his assassination continued in detention.

=== Denial of fair public trial ===
The law provides for an independent judiciary; however, in practice the judiciary is seen as subject to influence and coercion by government officials.

The civilian judicial system, including lower courts, appellate courts, the Supreme Court, and the Court of State Security, continued to be largely dysfunctional. Corruption remained pervasive, particularly among magistrates, who were paid poorly and intermittently.

Military courts, which had broad discretion in sentencing and no appeal process, tried military as well as civilian defendants during the year. Although the government permitted, and in some cases provided, legal counsel, lawyers often did not have free access to defendants. The public could attend trials only at the discretion of the presiding judge.

==== Trial procedures ====
In 2006, civil and criminal legal codes (based on Belgian and customary law), provided for the right to a speedy public trial, the presumption of innocence, and legal counsel. However, these rights were not respected in practice. While some judges allowed public access to trials, other judges, notably those presiding in rape trials, did not. There are no juries. Defendants have the right to appeal most cases except those involving national security, armed robbery, and smuggling, which the Court of State Security generally adjudicates. In some instances special military tribunals, whose jurisdiction is ill-defined, adjudicate national security cases. The law provides for court-appointed counsel at state expense in certain cases, but the government often did not provide such counsel.

==== Political prisoners and detainees ====
In 2006 there were reports of political prisoners and detainees but no reliable estimates of the number. The government sometimes permitted access to political prisoners by international groups.

According to AI, in June 2006, a military tribunal sentenced Fernando Kutino and two colleagues to 20 years following a brief trial. Kutino was originally charged with incitement to hatred after a May speech critical of the president; following the speech, broadcast by a radio station owned by Kutino's church, armed assailants in civilian clothes destroyed and looted the station's equipment on May 22, forcing it off the air. Press freedom NGO Committee to Protect Journalists (CPJ) alleged that the assailants were police officers. The court changed the charge to illegal possession of firearms, criminal conspiracy, and attempted murder (although the alleged victim refused to implicate Kutino). AI claimed that the court used evidence extracted from Kutino's codefendants under torture, and defense lawyers walked out nine days before the guilty verdict to protest the conduct of the trial. Kutino remained incarcerated at the end of the year.

In 2006 the Court of State Security sentenced Jeannete Abidje to 12 months in prison for offenses against the head of state. She claimed the president fathered her five-year-old daughter by raping her during his time as a soldier.

==== Civil judicial procedures ====
Civil courts exist for lawsuits and other disputes, but the public mainly use criminal courts.

=== Arbitrary interference with privacy, family, home, or correspondence ===
A report in 2006 noted that;

The law prohibits arbitrary interference with privacy, family, home, or correspondence; however, security forces routinely ignored these provisions. Soldiers, deserters, and police continued to harass and rob civilians. Security forces routinely ignored legal requirements for search warrants and entered and searched homes or vehicles at will. In general those responsible for such acts remained unidentified and unpunished. Police sometimes looted homes, businesses, and schools.

FARDC soldiers occupied a school in Bulungera, North Kivu Province following a February campaign against the Allied Democratic Forces-National Army for the Liberation of Uganda. They remained at the school for three months before a visiting minister negotiated with the regional military commander to have them relocated to an integration center.

FARDC 891st Battalion soldiers who were allied with renegade General Laurent Nkunda and not under central command authority occupied a primary school, which had served 1,388 pupils in the North Kivu Province town of Mbau, on March 30 and made it their military camp. They used doors and desks as firewood, converted classrooms to toilets, and looted the school's supplies. Military authorities did not investigate. A new regional military commander promised to remove the soldiers, but they remained in place at year's end.

In 2006, in the South Kivu Province town of Uvira, PNC officers searching unsuccessfully for a man apprehended his wife and their infant child instead. The woman claimed the officers beat her with a club. No known action was taken against the officers.

In August 2006, ANR agents in Lubumbashi, Katanga Province arrested two civilians in place of their employer who was accused of theft. The agents allegedly tied up and beat one of them before a senior officer intervened.

Armed groups operating outside government control in the east routinely subjected civilians to arbitrary interference with privacy, family, home, and correspondence (see section 1.g.).

=== Use of excessive force and other abuses in internal conflicts ===
In 2006, internal conflict continued in rural and mineral-rich parts of the east, particularly in Ituri District, northern Katanga province, and the provinces of North Kivu and South Kivu. Unlike in the previous year, there was no confirmation of reports of Rwanda or Uganda providing material support to armed groups that operated and committed human rights abuses in the country, or of the presence of Rwandan soldiers in the country.

In 2006, security forces and numerous armed groups continued to kill, abduct, torture, and rape civilians, and burn and destroy villages. The security forces and armed groups continued to use mass rape and sexual violence with impunity as weapons of war and to humiliate and punish victims, families, and communities. There were also sporadic reports of death or injury from landmines laid during the 1998-2003 war.

In 2006, fighting between the FARDC and armed groups continued to cause population displacements and limited access to conflict areas by humanitarian groups. According to the Office of the UN High Commissioner for Refugees (UNHCR), fighting between armed groups and the FARDC displaced more than 100,000 civilians in Katanga Province and at least 37,000 civilians in North Kivu Province during the year.

Security forces and armed groups continued to recruit and maintain child soldiers in their ranks. A 2006 report of the UN secretary general on children and armed conflict in the country, which covered the period July 2005 to May, found continued recruitment and use of children in security forces and armed groups. Perpetrators included transitional government security forces, FARDC forces allied with renegade General Nkunda and not under central command authority, Mai Mai militia, and the Democratic Forces for the Liberation of Rwanda (FDLR).

By the end of 2006, more than 20,000 children, including nearly 3,000 girls, had been demobilized from government security services and armed groups. NGOs estimated that as many as 30,000 children were once associated with armed groups. Although there were no reliable statistics, most credible sources, including the UN Children's Fund (UNICEF), estimated that at least 3,000 children had yet to be demobilized and remained in the ranks of or held by armed groups. According to an October AI report, girls accounted for 15 to 40 percent of the child soldiers, but in some areas they constituted less than 2 percent of child soldiers demobilized. AI attributed the discrepancy to a belief by NGOs working with child soldiers that girls among armed groups were either dependents or "wives" of adult fighters.

Recruitment of children began as young as age six, according to AI. Some children were forcibly recruited, while others enrolled for food, protection, or to escape poverty. Child soldiers faced violence from older soldiers and armed conflict. They were also exploited as porters or sex slaves.

At times, verification of reported abuses in the east was difficult due to geographical remoteness and hazardous security conditions; however, MONUC's presence allowed observers to gather more information than would have otherwise been possible, and according to local NGOs, helped decrease human rights violations by armed groups during the year.

On 6 May 2021, Felix Tshisekedi's administration declared martial law in conflict-ridden eastern provinces of North Kivu and Ituri province. The military quickly took over civilian authority in both provinces to suppress peaceful critics. The military and police have curtailed freedom of expression, put down peaceful demonstrations with lethal force, and arbitrarily detained and prosecuted activists, journalists, and political opposition members.

On 25 July 2022, the Human Rights Watch reported that the M23 armed group in eastern Democratic Republic of Congo summarily killed at least 29 civilians since mid-June 2022 in areas under their control. Abusive rebel force was receiving Rwandan support for its operations in North Kivu province. The HRW's senior Congo researcher, Thomas Fessy, stated that: “Since the M23 took control of several towns and villages in North Kivu in June, they've committed the same kind of horrific abuses against civilians that we've documented in the past.”

==== Abuses by transitional government security forces ====
A report in 2006 noted that;

Government forces arbitrarily arrested, raped, tortured, and summarily executed or otherwise killed civilians and looted villages during military actions against armed groups during the year. During the year the government conducted some trials for abuses committed in the context of internal conflicts in the east. In general, the trials were flawed, and sentences were not always enforced.

Clashes between FARDC troops and the FDLR in Nyamilima, North Kivu Province in June resulted in the deaths of eight civilians. FARDC soldiers allied with renegade General Nkunda and not under central command authority allegedly shot and killed three children at close range.

In 2006, a military court sentenced a FARDC army captain to 20 years in prison for ordering the killing of five children in Ituri District in 2005. According to MONUC he and his officers had ordered the children to carry goods looted from their village after the FARDC conducted an operation against Ituri militia. The captain then claimed the children were militiamen and ordered his men to kill them.

Rape by security forces remained a serious problem. Civilian officials prosecuted rape more frequently than military justice courts; military perpetrators enjoyed almost total impunity. Police, army and navy personnel, and ex-soldiers allegedly raped 32 women and two girls and systematically looted 120 homesteads in Waka, Equateur Province on March 19. Three suspects were arrested in June; the rest remained at large.

During 2006 MONUC reported increased sexual violence by FARDC soldiers near Uvira, South Kivu Province against girls as young as 10 years old. The commanding officer of the battalion refused to hand over accused soldiers, although judicial authorities had issued warrants for their arrest.

In 2006 a military court in Songo Mboyo, Equateur Province sentenced seven former MLC militia members to life in prison for crimes against humanity, including the December 2003 mass rape of more than 119 women. This ruling was the first judicial action against military personnel accused of crimes against humanity. The judge also found the transitional government responsible for the acts of the MLC soldiers. He ordered it to pay $10,000 (5.3 million Congolese francs) to the family of each woman who died as a result of the sexual assaults, $5,000 (2.65 million Congolese francs) to each survivor of sexual assault, and $3,000 (1.59 million Congolese francs) to each business owner whose shop was looted. On October 21, five of the former militia members escaped from Mbandaka military prison and had not been found by year's end.

In 2006, a military court in Mbandaka, Equateur Province convicted 42 FARDC soldiers for murders and rapes committed in 2005, which it considered crimes against humanity.

Security forces recruited children and used them as soldiers during the year although the exact number was not known. In 2006 MONUC identified 22 children among soldiers of the Fifth Integrated FARDC Brigade in Katanga Province. It found that FARDC Captain Mulenga in South Kivu Province had eight children in his ranks. He and his troops had also allegedly abducted five girls that month. Authorities later replaced the brigade's commanding officer.

In 2020, there were no incidents of FARDC using child soldiers.

==== Abuses by FARDC forces allied with renegade General Nkunda and not under central command authority ====
A report in 2006 noted that;

Renegade General Nkunda, a former officer of the Congolese Rally for Democracy (RCD) rebel group and later of the FARDC, remained subject to a September 2005 international arrest warrant for alleged war crimes and crimes against humanity committed since 2002. Based in a location in North Kivu Province well known to and monitored by the transitional government security forces and MONUC, General Nkunda continued to control an estimated 1,500 to 2,000 FARDC soldiers who operated outside the transitional government's central command authority, although the government continued to pay their salaries, at least periodically.

FARDC elements allied with renegade General Nkunda and not under central command authority killed civilians during the year. Three soldiers of the FARDC 811th Battalion, under the command of Major Claude in Kauma, North Kivu Province, attacked and looted a farm and forced the residents to transport the looted possessions. The soldiers summarily executed a civilian who refused to comply.

FARDC elements allied with renegade General Nkunda and not under central command authority killed demobilized soldiers during the year. Soldiers of the 83rd Brigade beat a demobilized soldier to death on January 25 and then crucified him on a tree, allegedly for deserting the army and leaving the RCD political party.

In Bwiza, North Kivu Province, 20 demobilized soldiers died in an underground holding cell in April and May after allegedly suffering cruel, inhuman, and degrading treatment by soldiers of the 83rd Brigade allied with renegade General Nkunda and not under central command authority.

FARDC elements allied with renegade General Nkunda and not under central command authority raped civilians during the year. Soldiers of the Nkunda-allied FARDC 83rd Brigade raped up to 90 women during a conflict in Kibirizi, North Kivu Province in January. MONUC interviewed victims who claimed to have been raped by three or four soldiers, often in front of family members, including children.

FARDC elements allied with renegade General Nkunda and not under central command authority recruited children into the military.

FARDC brigades not under central command authority recruited children for General Nkunda in North Kivu Province during the year. Soldiers ordered new child recruits to recruit other children, sometimes at gunpoint. At least 70 children were recruited in this way. MONUC reported an additional 170 children present in the 84th Brigade under Colonel Akilimali and the 85th Brigade under Colonel Samy.

FARDC elements allied with renegade General Nkunda and not under central command authority also re-recruited children. For example, according to MONUC, soldiers of the 835th Battalion abducted 13 demobilized children near Kitchange in Masisi (North Kivu Province) on June 22. On July 30, these soldiers traced two ex-child soldiers to their homes and tried to persuade them to return. Child protection NGOs stopped reunifying children with families in Masisi due to the risk of re-recruitment.

==== Abuses by armed groups outside government control ====
A report in 2006 noted that;

Armed groups outside government control committed numerous serious abuses, especially in rural areas of North and South Kivu provinces, northern Katanga Province, and Ituri District.

During the year armed groups raped, tortured, and killed civilians often as retribution for alleged collaboration with government forces. They sometimes threatened and harassed humanitarian workers. Armed groups killed nine UN peacekeepers during the year. Unlike in 2005, there were no reports of armed groups imposing travel restrictions on humanitarian aid organizations, human rights NGOs, or journalists. Unlike in 2005, there were no reports of armed groups killing or kidnapping humanitarian workers.

Armed groups continued to use mass rape and sexual violence as weapons of war. Gang rapes were common and were often committed in front of victims' families. Rapes were often extremely violent and were generally accompanied by threats and beatings. These rapes sometimes resulted in vaginal fistula, a rupture of vaginal tissue that left women unable to control bodily functions and vulnerable to ostracism.

In some cases sexual abuses committed by various armed groups in the east were limited in time or perpetrated sporadically, by multiple individuals. Other girls and women were subjected to repeated rape over longer periods by a single perpetrator; some were forcibly abducted. These girls and women were commonly referred to as war wives, who often served both as fighters and sex slaves for their commanders.

Armed groups, including Mai Mai, continued to abduct and forcibly recruit children to serve as forced laborers, porters, combatants, war wives, and sex slaves. Credible estimates of the total number of children associated with armed groups, many of whom were between the ages of 14 and 16, varied widely from 15,000 to 30,000 in 2005. Credible sources estimated that at least 3,000 child soldiers had not yet been demobilized countrywide by year's end.

Girls associated with armed groups were often assaulted, raped, and infected with HIV/AIDS.

==== The FDLR ====
A report in 2006 noted that;

In 2006 the FDLR, largely made up of Rwandan Hutus who fled to the Democratic Republic of the Congo in 1994 after the Rwandan genocide, were led by individuals responsible for executing and fomenting the genocide. Between 8,000 and 10,000 FDLR fighters and their families remained in the eastern provinces of North and South Kivu. Several hundred opted to voluntarily demobilize and return to Rwanda during the year.

On January 19, 2006, MONUC issued a report on the July 2005 attack on the South Kivu Province village of Kabingu by FDLR fighters under Commander Kyombe in reprisal for alleged collaboration by residents with the FARDC and MONUC. The report concluded that the troops killed more than 50 civilians, including more than 40 women and children burned alive or hacked to death. The troops raped 11 women and abducted four girls, killing three and compelling the fourth to become a "war wife." More than 10,000 civilians were displaced as a result of the action.

A group of FDLR fighters allegedly killed a civilian in Burugoya, South Kivu Province on May 3, 2006 and forced five local boys to transport the stolen items from his house. Only one boy returned to the village; the whereabouts of the others were unknown at year's end.

According to the Congolese Initiative for Justice and Peace, on July 23, 2006 in South Kivu Province, unidentified armed men believed to be FDLR killed and cannibalized the body of Alphonsine Nahabatabunga, one of several abductees.

The FDLR forcibly recruited children in North Kivu Province in April 2006 and allegedly gave them weapons to forcibly recruit others. One 15-year-old boy recruited in Masisi said he had recruited 20 children, and claimed 70 children already belonged to the FDLR when he joined it.

==== Ituri militia groups ====
A report in 2006 noted that; Militias in the Ituri District of Orientale Province, notably the Front for National Integration (FNI), the Congolese Revolutionary Movement (MRC), and the Front for Patriotic Resistance in Ituri (FPRI) continued to commit abuses against civilians, including killings, abductions, rapes, and child soldier recruitment.

During 2006 more than 4,800 former combatants in Ituri District voluntarily disarmed and joined the UN demobilization process. The National Commission for Disarmament, Demobilization, and Reinsertion (CONADER), set up several transit sites in Ituri but was able to fund reintegration programs for only a small number of those who had disarmed.

According to MONUC, there were reports in 2006 that the FNI, MRC, and FPRI were continuing to recruit new militia fighters by force. On October 10, the FARDC offered colonels' commissions to militia leaders Peter Karim (FNI) and Mathieu Ngonjolo (MRC) after their surrender in July; the transitional government promised to grant their fighters amnesty, except for war crimes and crimes against humanity, and promised military command positions to Karim and Ngonjolo. On November 28, Cobra Matata (FPRI) signed a similar disarmament agreement in exchange for amnesty.

On March 17, 2006, the transitional government transferred custody of Thomas Lubanga of the Ituri militia Union of Congolese Patriots (UPC) to the ICC, which had indicted him in February for war crimes and crimes against humanity for conscription and recruitment of child soldiers. It did not indict him for massacres, tortures, and rapes that human rights groups alleged he ordered.

In August 2006 a military tribunal in Ituri convicted Yves Kawa Panga Mandro of the UPC for crimes against humanity committed in November 2002. These included setting fire to clinics, schools, and churches, many of which were occupied.

In early October 2020, the Front for Patriotic Resistance in Ituri (FRPI) got into a conflict with the regular army of DR Congo, claiming 11 lives including 3 soldiers, 6 militias and 2 civilians, as per United Nations’ sources. The FRPI signed a peace deal with the government of the DR Congo on February 28, 2020. The recent fighting between the army (FARDC) and militia forces (FRPI) breached the peace deal.

==== Mai Mai ====
In 2006 Mai Mai militia groups in the provinces of Katanga, South Kivu, and North Kivu continued to commit abuses against civilians, including killings, abductions, rapes, and child soldier recruitment.

On May 12, 2006, Gédéon Kyungu Mutanga, a Mai Mai militia leader, surrendered to MONUC in Katanga with 150 combatants, mostly child soldiers. According to MONUC, the transitional government offered Gedeon a command position and officer's rank with integration into the army. He and his forces stood accused of at least a dozen summary executions of civilians and the destruction of numerous electoral identification cards, but at year's end he remained in Lubumbashi, Katanga Province and neither he nor his forces had been charged with any crime.

On July 6, 2006, MONUC issued a special report on human rights abuses committed in the territory of Mitwaba, Katanga Province during fighting between the FARDC and Mai Mai militia. MONUC found that between January 2005 and March, the FARDC summarily executed 33 civilians, and Mai Mai militia summarily executed 31. At least 15 civilians suspected of being Mai Mai disappeared and were allegedly executed by the FARDC after detention in Mitwaba Prison in March 2005. Between 2003 and 2006, Mai Mai militia and the FARDC had looted and burned 24 villages in the area.

==== Abuses by UN peacekeepers ====
A report in 2006 noted that;

During the year there were a few allegations of sexual abuse committed by MONUC's civilian and military personnel. MONUC reported that less than 0.1 percent of all military and fewer than 2 percent of all civilian personnel were accused of sexual exploitation and abuse during the year.

There was only one serious incident potentially involving MONUC peacekeepers during the year. In August media outlets reported the existence of a child prostitution ring in South Kivu Province involving peacekeepers and FARDC soldiers. Investigations by MONUC found that most patrons were Congolese soldiers. The MONUC force commander declared brothels off-limits and reinforced military police. The allegations were referred to the UN Office of Internal Oversight Services, and investigations were ongoing at year's end.

==== Conflict-related sexual violence against children ====
In early 2025, during the escalation of the conflict in eastern Congo, which saw the M23 rebels seize key cities, UNICEF reported a surge in sexual violence against children. Between January and February 2025, children made up 35-45% of nearly 10,000 reported cases of rape and sexual violence, equating to one child being raped every half hour. This violence, a stark reflection of the ongoing internal conflict, has devastated thousands of children. UNICEF warned that severe funding shortages risked depriving 250,000 children of critical services for gender-based violence and conflict protection.

=== Civil liberties ===
==== Freedom of speech and press ====
A report in 2006 noted that; The law provides for freedom of speech and of the press; however, the transitional government restricted these rights in practice and continued to violate press freedom during the year. There were several reports of security forces attacking, arresting, detaining, threatening, or harassing journalists. Authorities ordered several radio and television stations to temporarily cease operations for violating the media code of conduct, particularly during the election campaign.

Individuals could privately criticize the transitional government, its officials, and private citizens without being subject to official reprisals, and during the year such criticism frequently appeared in the media; however, security forces arrested, detained, and harassed politicians and other high-profile figures for criticizing the president or other members of the transitional government (see sections 1.d., 3, and 6.a.).

On September 25, the Kindu ANR arrested Shakodi Fazili, president of a civil society organization in Maniema Province, on the order of the province's governor, Koloso Sumaili. Sumaili had accused Fazili of exhorting the population to withhold taxes after Vice Governor Boniface Yemba claimed the governor was stealing from the provincial treasury. The ANR released Fazili 12 hours later following the personal intervention of the president.

Theodore Ngoy, charged with insulting the head of state in December 2005, remained in detention until March, when he escaped from a court hearing and found refuge in the South African Embassy. The court in which he was charged became defunct with the promulgation of the new constitution on February 18, and all charges against him were dropped by July 30. He remained free at year's end.

A large and active private press functioned throughout the country, and a large number of daily newspapers were licensed to publish. The transitional government required every newspaper to pay a $500 (265,000 Congolese francs) license fee and complete several administrative requirements before publishing. Many journalists lacked professional training, received little if any salary, and were vulnerable to manipulation by wealthy individuals, government officials, and politicians who provided cash or other benefits to encourage certain types of articles. While many newspapers remained critical of the transitional government, many showed bias toward it or particular political parties. Although there was no official newspaper, the government press agency published the Daily Bulletin, which included news reports, decrees, and official statements.

Radio remained the most important medium of public information due to limited literacy and the relatively high cost of newspapers and television. Numerous privately owned radio and television stations operated, in addition to two state-owned radio stations and one state-owned television station. The president's family and one vice president owned and operated their own television stations. Political parties represented in the transitional government could generally gain access to state radio and television.

Foreign journalists sometimes could not operate freely in the country due to actions by security forces or other individuals.

Security forces arrested, harassed, intimidated, and beat journalists because of their reporting. Unlike in the previous year, there were no reports of security forces killing or kidnapping journalists.

The GR in Kisangani assaulted and beat Anselme Masua of MONUC's Radio Okapi after he entered an army camp on April 24, although he had clearly identified himself as a journalist before doing so. By year's end there were no reports of authorities taking action against the GR soldiers responsible for the beating.

On June 10, a FARDC officer in the eastern town of Kabambare, Captain Kengo Lengo, destroyed the broadcast equipment of Tujenge Kabambare, a community radio station, temporarily knocking it off the air after it had alleged abuses by the FARDC. The officer later defended his action by claiming that the station's director had failed to answer a summons.

According to MONUC and Voice of the Voiceless (VSV), GR soldiers arrested a journalist in Kinshasa on June 25 and handcuffed him, beat him with cords, and subjected him to cruel, inhuman, and degrading treatment for five hours. They then detained him for three days at a military camp, Camp Tshatshi, and accused him of possessing an inflammatory photo showing President Kabila with Rwandan President Kagame. There were no reports of authorities taking any action against the soldiers.

On July 3, the transitional government expelled from the country Radio France International journalist Ghislaine Dupont. According to CPJ, Dupont was known to be critical of the president.

PNC officers detained two foreign journalists, Arnaud Zajtman of the BBC and Marlene Rabaud of Reuters, pointed a machine gun at them, and held them in a police car for three hours and then in a jail overnight on October 26 before releasing them. The journalists were covering a prison riot in Kinshasa.

Police arrested two journalists in Kinshasa between November 21 and 25 following the destruction of the Supreme Court building by a pro-Bemba mob: Clement Nku, a cameraman for Vice President Bemba's Canal Congo Television (CCTV), and Mbaka Bosange, a reporter for the weekly newspaper Mambenga. Police arrested Nku after he filmed police officers abandoning their uniforms and equipment to flee the mob. By year's end, Nku was released but Bosange remained in jail.

The trial of three FARDC soldiers accused of committing the November 2005 killings of journalist Frank Ngyke and his wife in Kinshasa was repeatedly postponed on technical grounds, and no verdict had been delivered by year's end. Two members of press freedom NGO Journalist in Danger (JED) claimed they received death threats in January after publishing the results of their investigation of the killings.

The 2005 robbing and attempted killing of Radio Okapi journalist Jean Ngandu by uniformed soldiers remained under investigation at year's end.

There was no additional information available on Jean-Marie Kanku, who was released on bail in 2005 after being charged with disseminating false information.

No action was taken against security forces who beat or harassed journalists in 2005, including the PNC officers who beat radio editor Kawanda Bakiman Nkorabishen, or in 2004.

The HAM, a quasi-governmental organization mandated by the transitional constitution, imposed sanctions on both privately owned and state-owned media during the year, particularly during the election campaign, for inciting ethnic hatred or violence and for violating media regulations intended to ensure balanced electoral reporting. The sanctions included broadcast suspensions of several days or weeks.

On July 19, the HAM suspended six television stations, including government-owned outlets, for 72 hours for violating regulations on electoral reporting.

On August 16, the HAM placed 24-hour sanctions on Vice President Bemba's CCTV, state-owned National Radio-Television (RTNC-1), and the pro-Kabila Radio TV Armee de l'Eternel (RTAE) for inciting violence. The suspensions were a result of RTAE's presentation of footage of the lynching and torture of police officers at a July 27 campaign rally for Vice President Bemba in Kinshasa (see section 1.a.); RTNC-1's extensive coverage of the police officers' funeral, during which the minister of the interior blamed the killings on Vice President Bemba's MLC party; and CCTV's presentation of footage of a 1998 bombing by then president Laurent Kabila's forces in Equateur Province.

The HAM limited the number of print and broadcast media that could cover the official electoral campaign to those specifically accredited to do so by the HAM.

Unlike in the previous year, there were no reports of police seizing newspapers from street vendors.

The transitional government used criminal libel laws to suppress criticism of political leaders, usually the head of state, and limit press freedom.

On June 8, authorities in Tshikapa, Western Kasai Province arrested Pierre-Sosthene Kambidi, a journalist for radio station Concorde FM, after he allegedly defamed a police commander during a June 7 broadcast by accusing him of committing police brutality. On June 10, a court convicted Kambidi of defamation and sentenced him to three months in jail. Pending appeal of his conviction, the court released Kambidi on June 14 after he posted $50 (26,500 Congolese francs) bail. Community radio stations throughout the country stopped broadcasting on June 17 to protest the conviction and other press freedom cases. No further information was available at year's end.

On May 30, the Court of State Security found Patrice Booto, the editor of Le Journal arrested in November 2005, guilty of insulting the head of state and sentenced him to six months in prison and a $500 (265,000 Congolese francs) fine. The charge stemmed from an article that Booto published claiming - without evidence - that the president gave $30 million to Tanzania for its education budget while the transitional government remained in a payment dispute with teachers. On July 27, after Booto paid the fine and spent nine months in jail, an appeals court found him guilty of reporting false information but acquitted him of insulting the head of state, resulting in his release on August 3.

During the year there were reports of unidentified persons killing a journalist; kidnapping, beating, threatening, and harassing other journalists; and forcing at least one radio station to temporarily close.

For example, Kabeya Pindi Pasi, a television journalist and president of the Congolese National Press Union, received anonymous death threats on May 16 after he reported alleged human rights abuses by Vice President Bemba and the MLC. He fled the country but returned shortly thereafter.

On July 8, unidentified armed persons killed freelance newspaper journalist Louis Bapuwa Mwamba after forcibly entering his Kinshasa home. The day before his death, daily newspaper Le Phare had published a commentary by Mwamba criticizing authorities and the international community for what he deemed to be the failure of the country's political transition. It was not clear whether the killing was politically motivated; local sources said the attackers took only Mwamba's cell phone. On July 25, authorities in the southwestern port city of Matadi arrested and detained a former soldier, Vungu Mbembe, and two civilians, Mangenele Lowawi and Kunku Makwala Sekula, and charged them with Mwamba's murder. No trial date had been set by year's end.

On October 12, unidentified armed men destroyed broadcast antennas at a private television station owned by Vice President Bemba in the Katanga province town of Lubumbashi, according to JED.

==== Internet freedom ====
The government does not restrict access to the Internet or monitor e-mail or Internet chat rooms. The Conseil Superieur de l’Audiovisuel et de la Communication (CSAC, Superior Council of Broadcasting and Communication) law stipulates that bloggers must obtain authorization from CSAC. Through the end of 2012 CSAC had not refused authorization to any bloggers. Private entrepreneurs make Internet access available at moderate prices through Internet cafes in large cities throughout the country. According to the International Telecommunication Union (ITU), just 1.2% of individuals used the Internet in 2011. By the end of 2012 Internet use had risen to 1.7% of the population. This low use limits the impact that the Internet has on the economic and political life of the country.

==== Academic freedom and cultural events ====
Unlike in the previous year, the transitional government did not restrict academic freedom or cultural events.

=== Freedom of peaceful assembly and association ===
A report in 2006 noted that;

The constitution provides for the right of freedom of peaceful assembly; however, the transitional government restricted this right in practice. The transitional government treated the right to assemble as subordinate to maintenance of public order and continued to require all organizers of public events to inform local authorities before holding a public event. According to the law, organizers are authorized to hold an event unless the local government denies authorization in writing within five days of notification. Security forces often dispersed unregistered protests, marches, or meetings and sometimes dispersed authorized protests and marches.

Security forces restricted the rights of several political party members to organize, hold protests, campaign, and publicize their views (see section 3). Some domestic human rights NGOs claimed to have been harassed and monitored by members of the security forces (see section 4).

During the year transitional government security forces killed demonstrators while dispersing crowds. There were no reports of authorities taking action to address these killings.

On May 4, FARDC soldiers in Bukavu, South Kivu Province fired on a crowd protesting insecurity in the city. A child, Noelle Buhendwa, was killed by shots fired by a FARDC captain.

On July 11, police dispersed a peaceful demonstration in Kinshasa. Although organizers had informed local authorities as required, the governor of Kinshasa had not authorized the demonstration and ordered police to halt it. One civilian lost most of his fingers to a tear gas canister explosion, and another fell into a coma after breathing tear gas.

On June 30, heavily armed FARDC soldiers in the Bas-Congo Province town of Matadi fired indiscriminately at a demonstration by Bundu Dia Kongo (BDK) separatists after a BDK member attacked and killed a soldier. The soldiers killed 13 civilians and injured 20. The ONDH issued a report assigning responsibility for the deaths to the commander of the Second Military Region who, believing the protesters were armed, had deployed FARDC troops. ONDH also blamed the BDK for violating the law requiring advance notification of rallies.

In September 2006, police arrested 10 civilians in Tshikapa, Western Kasai Province, during a peaceful demonstration about which they had informed the local administration 48 hours before. Authorities detained the 10 for 24 hours and released them the next day.

The constitution provides for freedom of association; however, in practice the transitional government sometimes restricted this right. During the year the transitional government sometimes harassed political parties, including party leaders, and restricted the registration of at least one political party (see section 3).

=== Freedom of religion ===
The constitution provides for freedom of religion and the right to worship and prohibits religious discrimination; this is subject to “compliance with the law, public order, public morality, and the rights of others.”.

The law provides for the establishment and operation of religious institutions and requires practicing religious groups to register with the government; registration requirements were simple and implemented in a nondiscriminatory manner. In practice unregistered religious groups operated unhindered.

In 2010, the Pew Research Center estimated that 95.8% of the population was Christian (approximately half Protestant and half Catholic).

In June 2006 FARDC soldiers fired on a demonstration by the separatist group BDK after adherents attacked and killed a soldier (see section 2.b.). The BDK, an ethnically based spiritual and political movement that continued to call for the establishment of an "ethnically pure" kingdom of the Bakongo people, remained outlawed for its separatist, political goals and its implication in acts of violence. In April 2020, action against the BDK lead to 77 deaths during raids and demonstrations, and the detention arrest of the group's leader.

=== Freedom of movement within the country, foreign travel, emigration, and repatriation ===
A report in 2006 noted that;

The law provides for freedom of movement within the country, foreign travel, emigration, and repatriation; however, the transitional government occasionally restricted these rights.

Security forces established barriers and checkpoints on roads, at ports, airports, and markets, ostensibly for security reasons, and routinely harassed and extorted money from civilians for supposed violations, sometimes detaining them until a relative paid. The transitional government forced travelers to pass through immigration procedures during domestic travel at airports, lake ports, and when entering and leaving towns.

Local authorities in North and South Kivu Provinces routinely required travelers to present official travel orders from an employer or transitional government official.

The significant risk of rape perpetrated by uniformed men restricted freedom of movement by women in many areas.

Armed groups in the east restricted or prevented freedom of movement during the year. They also harassed travelers and often raped women.

Passport issuance was irregular and often required payment of significant bribes. The law requires married women to have their husband's permission in order to travel outside the country; however, there were no reports that the transitional government prevented particular groups from acquiring passports.

Dissident politician Joseph Olenghankoy, whose passport was temporarily confiscated in 2005 and who subsequently left the country, returned and ran for president and subsequently managed Vice President Bemba's second-round presidential campaign.

The law prohibits forced exile, and there were no reports that the transitional government used forced exile.

The government did not restrict emigration or prohibit the return of citizens who had left the country.

==== Internally displaced persons (IDPs) ====
A report in 2006 noted that;

As of June 2006, MONUC estimated there were approximately 1.1 million IDPs, concentrated in the east, particularly in North Kivu Province (see section 1.g.).

Military operations conducted by the FARDC with MONUC support against armed groups outside government control led to internal displacement of many persons during the year. Attacks on local populations by armed groups also caused significant displacements (see section 1.g).

The transitional government did not provide protection or assistance to IDPs, who continued to rely exclusively on humanitarian organizations for assistance. The transitional government generally allowed domestic and international humanitarian organizations to provide assistance to IDPs. Fighting between the FARDC and armed groups sometimes restricted the ability of humanitarian organizations to assist IDPs (see section 1.g.). The transitional government did not attack or target IDPs, nor did it forcibly return or resettle IDPs under dangerous conditions. However, in April MONUC reported that FARDC soldiers had subjected numerous IDPs to forced labor in cassiterite mines in Mitwaba, Katanga Province.

On several occasions, armed groups denied access to IDPs by humanitarian organizations or obstructed their ability to deliver supplies (see section 1.g.).

==== Protection of refugees ====
A report in 2006 noted that;

The law provides for the granting of asylum or refugee status in accordance with the 1951 UN Convention relating to the Status of Refugees and its 1967 protocol, and the transitional government had established a rudimentary system for providing protection to refugees. In practice, it granted refugee and asylum status and provided protection against refoulement, the return to a country where individuals feared persecution.

The transitional government provided temporary protection to an undetermined number of individuals who may not have qualified as refugees under the 1951 convention and its 1967 protocol.

The transitional government cooperated with the UNHCR and other humanitarian organizations in assisting refugees and asylum seekers.

== Political rights ==
The country is a centralized constitutional republic and voters elect the president and the lower house of parliament; the last elections for presidential, legislative, and provincial posts were held on December 30, 2018. Some irregularities were reported, but the 2019 inauguration of President Félix Tshisekedi was the first peaceful transfer of power in the country's history.

=== 2006 Elections and political participation ===
In 2006, nearly 18 million of 25 million registered voters participated in the presidential and parliamentary elections. More than 15 million voters participated in the October 29 presidential run-off and provincial elections. Voters elected Kabila president on October 29 with 58 percent of the run-off vote; his opponent, Vice President Bemba, received 42 percent. The top three vote-receiving parties in the national legislative elections were the People's Party for Reconstruction and Democracy, allied with President Kabila; Vice President Bemba's MLC party; and Gizenga's United Lumumbist Party, which subsequently entered into coalition with the AMP. Parties affiliated with President Kabila's AMP coalition won majorities in eight of the 11 provincial assemblies.

The Carter Center and the European Union (EU) Observer Mission both judged the July 30 and October 29 votes credible. The Carter Center said the elections were "very well executed" and expressed confidence that the results announced by the country's Independent Electoral Commission (CEI) were "consistent with the results obtained in the polling stations." However, both organizations reported some irregularities in the July 30 and October 29 votes related to the campaign period, voting procedures, and the collection of election materials. The Carter Center noted instances of disruption or attempted manipulation of the electoral process but said that they appeared "isolated and unlikely to affect the overall success of the vote."

The Carter Center identified deficiencies in voting and ballot collection procedures in the first round of voting. The Carter Center and the EU noted substantial progress in correcting these deficiencies prior to the second round.

The Supreme Court dismissed claims by Vice President Bemba that massive fraud had occurred during the October 29 vote and subsequent count. Both the Carter Center and the EU confirmed that irregularities had occurred and involved both sides but that those irregularities were not of a magnitude to change the presidential election's outcome.

African election observers also judged the July 30 and October 29 elections credible. The African Union found that any irregularities were not serious enough to undermine the credibility of the elections. The Southern African Development Community Parliamentary Forum said the elections conformed to regional electoral norms and standards. The Electoral Institute of Southern Africa and the Common Market for Eastern and Southern Africa both stated that voters were able to express their democratic choices without hindrance.

There were reports of isolated cases of violence, including two accidental killings by security forces, but there was no evidence to suggest that the violence was intended to prevent, or that it prevented, citizens from voting. However, there were also reports of interference with voting rights. For example, some members of the security forces in the provinces of Katanga and North Kivu allegedly confiscated electoral cards and demanded cash for their return before the July 30 elections.

In July participants in a Kinshasa campaign rally for MLC presidential candidate Bemba killed a civilian and members of security forces, destroyed property, and committed rape (see section 1.a.).

On October 29, a crowd burned down several polling stations in Equateur Province after security forces accidentally killed a bystander (see section 1.a.).

MONUC reported that on October 29, FARDC soldiers stopped a group of more than 200 citizens on their way to vote and subjected them to physical abuse in Aveba, Ituri District. In Nizi, also in Ituri District, FARDC soldiers established a checkpoint and demanded money from travelers, including citizens on their way to vote. In both cases, the FARDC regional military commander arrested several soldiers for their actions. No additional information was available at year's end.

On November 21, after Vice President Bemba's attorneys formally contested the provisional election results, Bemba's supporters set the Supreme Court building on fire. UN forces restored order after riot police fled the scene. Bemba supporters beat one police officer. The Supreme Court confirmed the election results on November 27, and Vice President Bemba agreed to abide by the results.

Some privately owned and state broadcast stations provided overtly biased, unbalanced, or false election coverage favoring certain candidates. The HAM sanctioned state and privately owned broadcast stations during the campaign for inciting ethnic hatred or violence and for violating media regulations intended to ensure balanced electoral reporting. The HAM sanctioned stations favoring Vice President Bemba more frequently than stations favoring President Kabila, and most observers said they believed that pro-Kabila stations also violated the media code of conduct and were sanctioned, but they did not commit as many infractions as pro-Bemba stations did (see section 2.a.). On numerous occasions during the campaign, broadcast stations owned by Bemba or his supporters promoted ethnic hatred. Vice President Bemba's campaign used ethnic slurs in reference to President Kabila and alleged that Kabila, who spent part of his youth outside the country, was a foreigner.

=== Political parties ===
A 2006 report notes;

Individuals could freely declare their candidacies and stand for election as long as they legally registered. During the year the CEI disallowed the registration of five political parties for technical reasons, but registered more than 200 other political parties.

Unlike in previous years, the government did not require political parties to apply for permits to hold press conferences.

Security forces restricted the rights of several politicians, including members of the transitional government, to organize, protest, campaign, and publicize their views.

On May 24, security forces surrounded the homes of 11 presidential candidates prior to a planned protest, allegedly for their security. Security forces denied entry and exit of all persons throughout the day.

On June 27, the ANR arrested 12 UDPS party members for arms possession and arbitrarily detained them in a military camp in Mbuji Mayi, Eastern Kasai Province. Four were released on June 29, four on July 1, and four on July 29. No charges were ever brought against those arrested. The UDPS boycotted the electoral process and some of its members initiated and threatened violence against would-be voters in the Kasai provinces before and during the first round of voting.

MONUC reported that ANR officers in Kalemie and Lubumbashi, Katanga Province, and Uvira, South Kivu Province, made more than 30 arrests for political reasons and mistreated and tortured some of the detainees who were members or supporters of political parties. There were no reports of authorities taking action against those responsible for these actions.

A North Kivu local administrator and PNC officers allegedly prevented a delegation of the Christian Federalist Democracy-Convention of Federalists for Christian Democracy alliance from campaigning after 6 p.m. on July 18. The officers allegedly tried to extort money from the delegation and banned them from campaigning in the area of Luofu, North Kivu Province.

AMP candidates and campaigners alleged that the FARDC 83rd Brigade, which was allied with renegade General Nkunda and not under central command authority, threatened them with violence and prevented them from campaigning on July 18. A later agreement between Nkunda, MONUC, and the CEI to allow AMP campaigning for the second round of presidential elections was not consistently respected by Nkunda's forces (see section 1.g).

On July 30, GR soldiers reportedly arrested two aides to a presidential candidate and kept them blindfolded at an unknown location for a day (see section 1.d.).

Five of 36 appointed cabinet ministers and three of 24 appointed vice ministers in the transitional government were women. Women held 60 of the 620 appointed seats in the transitional parliament and 42 of 500 seats in the newly elected National Assembly.

During the year one Tutsi, from North Kivu Province, was elected to the National Assembly.

=== Government corruption and transparency ===
A 2006 report notes;

Corruption remained endemic throughout the transitional government and security forces. The public perceived the transitional government to be widely corrupt at all levels. According to NGO Transparency International (TI), both resident and nonresident experts perceived corruption among the country's public officials to be "rampant," the most severe assessment designation used by TI.

Weak financial controls and lack of a functioning judicial system encouraged officials to engage in corruption with impunity. Many civil servants, police, and soldiers had not been paid in years, received irregular salaries, or did not earn enough to support their families, all of which encouraged corruption. For example, local authorities continued to extort "taxes" and "fees" from boats traveling on many parts of the Congo River.

The mining sector lost millions of dollars to widespread theft, corruption, and fraud involving government officials. According to a July report by Global Witness, transitional government officials actively colluded with trading companies to circumvent control procedures and payment of taxes, extorting large sums of money in a system of institutionalized corruption. HRW reported that armed groups, government officials and, increasingly, military officers continued to profit from the illegal exploitation of the country's mineral resources, often in collusion with foreign interests.

The government took some steps to combat corruption. For example, in February, the National Assembly's Lutundula Commission, named for its chairman, released a report detailing corruption in the awarding of 60 wartime mining and business contracts. The report implicated many senior politicians, some of whom were fired from high-ranking positions as a result. The report was funded by the World Bank and was widely available on the Internet, but its findings and recommendations were not debated by the Assembly. According to HRW, some commission members said they received death threats.

Through the use of defamation laws that carry criminal punishments, transitional government authorities and wealthy individuals sometimes restricted the freedom of press and speech on occasions when the media investigated or made accusations of government corruption.

The law does not provide for public access to government-held information, and in practice the government did not grant access to government documents for citizens or noncitizens, including foreign media, although there were no reports of requests for access.

== Governmental attitude regarding investigation of alleged violations ==
A 2006 report notes;

A wide variety of domestic and international human rights organizations investigated and published findings on human rights cases. The Human Rights Ministry and the ONDH worked with NGOs and MONUC during the year and responded to their requests and recommendations. However, security forces harassed and arrested domestic human rights advocates, and prison officials sometimes obstructed NGO access to detainees.

The main Kinshasa-based domestic human rights organizations included ASADHO, VSV, Groupe Jeremie, the Committee of Human Rights Observers, and the Christian Network of Human Rights and Civic Education Organizations. Prominent organizations operating in areas outside Kinshasa included Heirs of Justice in Bukavu, South Kivu Province; Lotus Group and Justice and Liberation in Kisangani, Orientale Province; and Justice Plus in Bunia, Ituri District. The transitional government's human rights bodies met with domestic NGOs and sometimes responded to their inquiries but took no known actions.

For example, according to MONUC, armed men, who were believed to be soldiers of the FARDC 813th battalion allied with renegade General Nkunda and not under central command authority, abducted and killed a local NGO member in the North Kivu Province town of Masisi; the person was reportedly killed for calling on soldiers to join the demobilization process.

VSV President Floribert Chebeya Bahizire and Vice President Dolly Mbunga alleged that the ANR placed them under continuous surveillance after they disseminated a posters intended to persuade citizens not to vote in the general elections. VSV alleged that the ANR monitored visitors and members at the VSV office. On July 26, VSV closed its Kinshasa office, and both leaders went into hiding. By year's end, they had resumed their positions.

The case of two FARDC soldiers arrested for killing human rights activist Pascal Kabungula Kibembi in Bukavu, South Kivu Province in July 2005 remained unresolved, and neither soldier remained in custody.

According to HRW, two domestic human rights activists in the North Kivu town of Goma, Richard Bayunda and Sheldon Hangi, received threatening telephone calls in January and February. Unidentified armed men also came to their homes at night on one occasion in February but were unable to gain entry. The two activists had returned after fleeing the country in 2005 following death threats.

On March 18, a member of the National Union of Federalists of the Congo political party threatened Hubert Tshiswaka, director of Action against Impunity for Human Rights, after he issued a press release calling on citizens not to vote for human rights violators. On April 1, he received a death threat via an anonymous phone call, according to AI.

According to MONUC, a domestic human rights activist in Ituri District received anonymous death threats between July 5 and July 10, allegedly because of his cooperation with MONUC and the ICC in the Thomas Lubanga case.

The transitional government generally cooperated with international NGOs, which published several reports on human rights and humanitarian issues, and permitted them access to conflict areas. However, there were some exceptions.

For example, in September the ANR detained the head of the Bukavu office of the International Rescue Committee, Sylvie Louchez, and demanded to see several identification and registration papers before releasing her. In October the ANR detained the head of the Bukavu office of the NGO War Child for seven hours. The NGO paid a bribe to secure her release.

During the year unidentified persons threatened members of international NGOs. For example, a senior researcher for HRW reported that she and other staff members regularly received anonymous death threats following the publication of reports on human rights violations during the year.

The transitional government cooperated with multilateral organizations and permitted international humanitarian agencies access to conflict areas. A number of senior UN officials visited the country during the year, including Under Secretary General for Peacekeeping Jean-Marie Guehenno and Under Secretary General for Political Affairs Ibrahim Gambari.

On June 13, the UN Security Council received a report of the UN secretary general on children and armed conflict in the country (see section 1.g.).

On [March 16, MONUC issued reports on the detention of children and justice for minors (see section 5) and on arrests and detentions in prisons (see section 1.d.).

MONUC also issued special reports on human rights violations and abuses committed in the territory of Mitwaba, Katanga in 2005 and on the attack on Kabingu village in South Kivu Province in July 2005 (see section 1.g).

UN officials freely criticized actions by the transitional government during the year.

Armed groups killed nine UN peacekeepers in 2006 (see section 1.g.).

Unlike in 2005, there were no reports of armed groups in the east imposing travel restrictions on humanitarian aid workers or local NGOs.

The transitional constitution mandated an independent ONDH and a Truth and Reconciliation Commission. Both entities lacked resources and were generally regarded as ineffective. Although the transitional government did not actively interfere with their investigations, neither did it cooperate with them.

On August 8, the ONDH reported its findings on two incidents: the transitional government's use of force against BDK adherents in June (see section 2.b.) and mob violence associated with an election rally in Kinshasa on July 27 (see section 1.a.).

During the year, the transitional government cooperated with the ICC, which continued conducting investigations into war crimes and crimes against humanity committed in the country since July 2002. In March the government transferred to the ICC custody of an Ituri militia leader indicted for recruitment of child soldiers (see section 1.g.).

The government continued to cooperate with the International Criminal Tribunal for Rwanda (ICTR). ICTR investigators operated freely in areas under government control, seeking a number of individuals indicted for involvement in the 1994 Rwandan genocide whom they believed might be in the Democratic Republic of the Congo.

More recently, Congolese authorities cracked down on peaceful protesters, journalists, and politicians, while using state of emergency measures temporarily imposed due to the Covid-19 pandemic as a pretext to curb protests.

== Discrimination, societal abuses, and trafficking in persons ==
The constitution prohibits discrimination based on ethnicity, sex, or religious affiliation; however, the government did not enforce these prohibitions effectively, in part because it lacked appropriate institutions.

=== Women ===
A 2006 report notes;

Domestic violence against women occurred throughout the country; however, there were no statistics available regarding its extent. Although the law considers assault a crime, it does not specifically address spousal abuse, and police rarely intervened in domestic disputes. Judges set the penalties for those convicted of assault, and the laws establish minimum penalties. There were no reports of judicial authorities taking action in cases of domestic or spousal abuse.

The law criminalizes rape, but the government did not effectively enforce this law. On June 22, the transitional parliament approved a new sexual violence law, which broadened the definition of rape to include male victims, and which addressed sexual slavery, sexual harassment, forced pregnancy, and other sexual crimes not previously covered by law. It also increased penalties for sexual violence, prohibited compromise fines, allowed victims of sexual violence to waive appearance in court, and permitted closed hearings to protect confidentiality. The law neither mentions sexual violence in marriage nor prohibits spousal rape.

Rape was common throughout the country; however, there were no available statistics regarding its prevalence. The minimum penalty prescribed for rape was a prison sentence of five to 12 years. Prosecutions for rape and other types of sexual violence remained rare. It was common for family members to instruct a rape victim to keep quiet about the incident, even to health care professionals, to safeguard the reputations of the victim and her family. The press rarely reported incidents of violence against women or children; press reports of rape generally appeared only if it occurred in conjunction with another crime, or if NGOs reported on the subject.

Girls and women who had been raped often found it difficult to find husbands, and married women who were raped were often abandoned by their husbands.

Some families forced rape victims to marry the men who raped them or to forego prosecution in exchange for money or goods from the rapist.

Victims and experts cited widespread impunity as the main reason sexual violence continued. A small number of sexual violence cases, mostly committed by civilians, have been brought to court. In general, however, most victims did not have sufficient confidence in the justice system to pursue formal legal action for fear of subjecting themselves to further humiliation and possible reprisal.

Female genital mutilation (FGM), while not widespread, exists among some populations in northern parts of the country; the prevalence of FGM is estimated at 5% of women in the country. FGM is now illegal: the law imposes a penalty of two to five years of prison and a fine of 200,000 Congolese francs on any person who violates the "physical or functional integrity" of the genital organs.

The constitution prohibits forced prostitution and bans prostitution of children under age 18. Although there were no available statistics regarding its prevalence, adult and child prostitution occurred throughout the country, and there were reports of women and girls pressured or forced to engage in prostitution by their families. Security forces encouraged prostitution and used prostitutes, and there were unconfirmed reports that security forces harassed and raped prostitutes.

There were reports that women were trafficked (see section 5, Trafficking).

Sexual harassment occurred throughout the country; however, no statistics existed regarding its prevalence. The new sexual violence law prohibits sexual harassment, and the minimum penalty prescribed by law is a prison sentence of one to 20 years; however, by year's end judicial authorities had yet to bring charges in a single case.

Women did not possess the same rights as men. The law requires a married woman to obtain her husband's consent before engaging in legal transactions, including selling or renting real estate, opening a bank account, and applying for a passport. Under the law women who committed adultery may be sentenced to up to one year in prison; male adultery is punishable only if judged to have "an injurious quality." The DRC Family Code stipulates that the man is the head of the household and the woman must obey him. Women experienced economic discrimination. The law forbids women from working at night or accepting employment without their husband's consent. According to the International Labor Organization (ILO), women often received less pay in the private sector than men doing the same job and rarely occupied positions of authority or high responsibility.

Angélique Namaika, a Roman Catholic nun from Orientale Province, is the 2013 recipient of the United Nations High Commissioner for Refugees' Nansen Refugee Award for her work with refugee women who have suffered trauma and displacement in the northeastern DRC.

=== Children ===
The government budgeted little for children's welfare and did not make it a priority. Primary school education was not compulsory, free, or universal, and very few functioning government-funded schools existed. Most schooling was provided by religious organizations. Public and private schools expected - but did not require - parents to pay fees as contributions to teachers' salaries. In practice, parents funded 80 to 90 percent of school expenses. These expected contributions, plus the loss of labor while the child was in school, meant that many parents could not afford to enroll their children. According to the United Nations Development Program, approximately 3.5 million primary school-age children and more than six million adolescents did not attend school during the year. Attendance rates for girls were lower because many parents with meager financial resources preferred to send their sons to school. Barely half of all children reached grade five, and less than 1 percent of primary school children went on to complete secondary education.

The law prohibits all forms of child abuse. Its extent was unknown and had not been investigated. The constitution prohibits parental abandonment of children due to the children's alleged practice of sorcery; such accusations led to cases of child abandonment, child abuse, and killings (see section 1.a.). Although authorities made a few arrests related to child abandonment and abuse during the year, no cases had been prosecuted by year's end. NGOs concluded that 60 to 70 percent of the country's more than 50,000 homeless children were abandoned by their families after being accused of sorcery. Many churches in the capital, Kinshasa, conducted exorcisms of children involving isolation, beating and whipping, starvation, and forced ingestion of purgatives.

FGM is punishable by at least two years in prison.

The law prohibits marriage of girls under age 15 and boys under 18; however, marriages of girls younger than 15 sometimes took place, some involving girls under 13. Dowry payments greatly contributed to underage marriage. In some cases parents married off a daughter against her will to collect a dowry or to finance a dowry for a son to give to his future wife. The newly enacted sexual violence law criminalizes forced marriage. It subjects parents to up to 12 years' hard labor and a fine of $185 (98,050 Congolese francs) for forcing children to marry. The penalty doubles when the victim is a minor. There were no reports of convictions for forced marriage by year's end.

Child prostitution occurred throughout the country; however, there were no statistics available regarding its prevalence. Many homeless children engaged in prostitution without third-party involvement, although some were forced to do so (see sections 1.g. and 5, Trafficking). In Kinshasa, police allegedly extorted sexual services from child prostitutes. Security forces and armed groups trafficked children as soldiers, porters, and for sexual services (see section 5, Trafficking).

Security forces and armed groups continued to maintain child soldiers in their ranks (see section 1.g.).

Child labor, including forced labor, was widespread throughout the country (see sections 1.g. and 6.d.), especially in the mining industry and the mineral production according to the 2014 List of Goods Produced by Child Labor or Forced Labor.

The country's more than 50,000 street children included many accused of sorcery, child refugees, and war orphans, although some would return to their families at day's end. The transitional government was ill-equipped to deal with large numbers of homeless youth and children. Citizens generally regarded them as thugs engaged in petty crime, begging, and prostitution and tolerated their marginalization. Security forces abused and arbitrarily arrested street children (see sections 1.c. and 1.d.).

There were numerous reports of collusion between police and street children, including street children paying police officers to allow them to sleep in vacant buildings, and others turning over to police a percentage of goods they stole from large markets. In addition, there were reports that different groups and individuals regularly paid groups of homeless youths to disrupt public order.

There were several active and effective local and international NGO groups working with MONUC and UNICEF to promote children's rights throughout the country, and with CONADER, the national disarmament agency.

=== Trafficking in persons ===
Child sex trafficking is illegal, punishable by a prison term of at least ten years.

A 2006 report notes;

The country is a source and destination country for men, women, and children trafficked internally for forced labor and sexual exploitation.

Domestic and foreign armed groups operating outside government control in the east were responsible for the majority of reported cases of trafficking. Armed groups, and to a lesser extent transitional government security forces, continued to kidnap men, women, and children and force them to serve as porters, domestic laborers, and sex slaves (see section 1.g.). In addition, armed groups and security forces abducted children to serve as combatants in areas under their control (see section 1.g.).

There were reports of child prostitutes working in brothels. No statistical information existed on the extent of adult or child prostitution in the country. Some families pressured or forced girls to engage in prostitution.

The Ministry of Justice was primarily responsible for combating trafficking. Local law enforcement authorities were rarely able to enforce existing laws due to lack of personnel, funding, and the inaccessibility of eastern areas of the country; however, during the year the government prosecuted and cooperated in at least three cases against traffickers.

For example, in March judicial authorities sentenced Jean Pierre Biyoyo, a FARDC soldier not under central command authority, to five years' imprisonment for war crimes, including the recruitment and use of child soldiers, committed in South Kivu Province in April 2004.

Also in March the government gave the ICC custody of a former Ituri militia leader accused of recruiting and using children under the age of 15 as combatants (see section 1.g.).

The government operated several programs to prevent trafficking. CONADER used media, posters, and brochures to campaign against child soldiering. The transitional government coordinated with other countries on trafficking issues and attended regional meetings on trafficking. However, government efforts to combat trafficking were limited by a lack of resources and information. The government had few resources for training, although it permitted training of officials by foreign governments and NGOs. It provided no funding for protection services.

The Trafficking in Persons Report 2012 states "The Democratic Republic of the Congo is a source, destination, and possibly a transit country for men, women, and children subjected to forced labor and sex trafficking. The majority of this trafficking is internal, and while much of it is perpetrated by armed groups and rogue elements of government forces outside government control in the country's unstable eastern provinces, incidents of trafficking occur throughout all 11 provinces." And "The UN reported that indigenous and foreign armed groups, notably the FDLR, Patriotes Resistants Congolais (PARECO), various local militia (Mai-Mai), the Forces republicaines federalistes (FRF), the Forces de Resistance Patriotique en Ituri (FPRI), the Front des Patriotes de la Justice au Congo (FPJC), the Allied Democratic Forces/National Army for the Liberation of Uganda (ADF/NALU), and the Lord's Resistance Army (LRA), continued to abduct and forcibly recruit Congolese men, women, and children to bolster their ranks and serve as laborers, porters, domestics, combatants, and sex slaves."

=== Persons with disabilities ===
The law prohibits discrimination against persons with disabilities; and the law does not mandate accessibility to buildings or government services for persons with disabilities and people with disabilities often find it difficult to obtain employment, education, and other government services.

=== National/racial/ethnic minorities ===
In 2020, estimates of the country's indigenous population, including Twa, Baka, Mbuti, Aka, and other groups, varied greatly, from 250,000 to two million. There was widespread societal discrimination against these groups, with little official protection.

In 2006, the constitution allowed citizens to hold only Congolese nationality. The president of the Tutsi community in Goma, North Kivu Province, Dunia Bakarani, claimed this provision was biased and discriminated against the Tutsi ethnic group, some of whom held Rwandan citizenship. However, many citizens, including senior government officials, were widely believed to hold dual nationality.

In 2006, FARDC and other security forces sometimes harassed, arbitrarily arrested, and threatened Tutsis - including the Banyamulenge, a Tutsi subgroup - in North and South Kivu provinces.

=== Indigenous people ===
In 2006, the country had a population of fewer than 10,000 Pygmies (Batwa), who were believed to have been the country's original inhabitants; during the year societal discrimination against them continued. Although they were citizens, most Pygmies took no part in the political process as they continued to live in remote areas. During 2006 fighting between armed groups and government security forces in North Kivu Province caused significant population displacement of Pygmies.

Judicial authorities did not file charges in the 2005 case of a Katanga provincial leader attempting via local media to incite discrimination against the Luba ethnic group from Western and Eastern Kasai.

=== Incitement to acts of discrimination ===
During the 2006 election campaign, broadcast stations owned by Vice President Bemba or his supporters promoted ethnic hatred and suggested that President Kabila was not sufficiently "Congolese" (see sections 2.a. and 3).

=== LGBT rights ===
In 2020, identifying as lesbian, gay, bisexual, transgender, or intersex remained a cultural taboo.

== Workers' rights ==
=== The right of association ===
A 2006 report notes;

The constitution provides all workers—except for magistrates, high-ranking government officials, private sector managers, and members of the security forces—the right to form and join trade unions without prior authorization. Workers formed unions in practice; however, the Ministry of Labor, which had responsibility for ensuring the right of association, conducted no inspections and exercised no oversight during the year. Of an estimated 24 million adults of working age, 128,000 (0.5 percent) belonged to unions, according to the American Center for International Labor Solidarity (Solidarity Center). The informal sector, including subsistence agriculture, constituted at least 90 percent of the economy.

The law provides for union elections every five years; however, the transitional government did not allow them in the public sector, with the exception of parastatal industries.

According to MONUC, security forces arbitrarily arrested and detained the head of the trade union Prosperity on January 27, 2006 following a meeting in which he denounced irregularities in public sector salary payments. No additional information was available by year's end.

The law prohibits discrimination against unions, although this regulation was not enforced effectively. The law also requires employers to reinstate workers fired for union activities. The Interunion Committee, composed of public and private sector unions, is not legally mandated. However, it was generally recognized by the transitional government to negotiate with it and employers on labor issues of policy and law, although the transitional government did not meet with it during the year.

Private companies often registered bogus unions to discourage real ones from organizing and create confusion among workers. According to the Solidarity Center, many of the nearly 400 unions in the private sector had no membership and had been established by management, particularly in the natural resources sector.

=== The right to organize and bargain collectively ===
The law provides for the right of unions to conduct activities without interference and the right to bargain collectively; the law also allows most workers to conduct legal strikes.

In the past Collective bargaining has been ineffective in practice. In the public sector, the government set wages by decree, and unions were permitted by law to act only in an advisory capacity. Most unions in the private sector collected dues from workers but did not succeed in engaging in collective bargaining on their behalf.

The constitution provides for the right to strike, and workers sometimes exercised it. In small and medium-sized businesses, workers effectively did not have the ability to strike. With an enormous unemployed labor pool, companies could immediately replace any workers attempting to unionize, collectively bargain, or strike, and companies reportedly did so during the year. The law requires unions to have prior consent and to adhere to lengthy mandatory arbitration and appeal procedures before striking. The law prohibits employers and the government from retaliating against strikers; however, the transitional government did not enforce this law in practice and sometimes jailed striking public sector employees.

During 2006 union leaders attempted to organize a strike at the diamond concession MIBA in Eastern Kasai Province; they were all fired, according to the Solidarity Center.

=== Prohibition of forced or compulsory labor ===
The constitution prohibits forced or compulsory labor, including by children; however, there is little investigation or punishment of this.

A 2006 report notes;

Security forces used forced labor during the year, including forced labor by IDPs (see sections 2.d. and 5).

According to MONUC, in February 2006 FARDC soldiers in North Kivu Province allegedly detained five civilians at a military camp in Muhangi and forced them to build shelters, clean the camp, transport water, and cook. No additional information was available by year's end.

On August 11, 2006, FARDC soldiers abducted 20 civilians from Gethy, Ituri District, and forced them to harvest and transport manioc, according to HRW. No additional information was available by year's end.

Armed groups, and to a lesser extent transitional government security forces, continued to kidnap men, women, and children and force them to serve as porters, domestic laborers, and sex slaves. For example, HRW reported multiple incidents in August and September of soldiers in Ituri District abducting civilians for forced labor, including as personal attendants, miners, and crop harvesters and transporters.

In the mining sector, dealers who purchased raw ore from unlicensed miners provided them with tools, food, and other products in exchange for a certain amount of ore. Miners who failed to provide ore, however, accumulated significant debts and became debt slaves, forced to continue working to pay off their debts. The transitional government did not attempt to regulate this practice.

Armed groups operating outside government control subjected civilians to forced labor. Many armed groups routinely forced civilians to transport looted goods for long distances without pay, and abducted men, women, and children for forced labor. On occasion, armed groups also forced civilians to mine, particularly in Ituri District. Armed groups forced women and children to provide household labor or sexual services for periods ranging from several days to several months (see section 1.g.).

On July 4, 2006, Rwandan Hutu militia in the South Kivu Province town of Tshifunzi allegedly abducted four men and three children. The attackers stole livestock, utensils, and clothes and forced the men to carry the looted goods. No additional information was available at year's end.

Forced or compulsory labor by children occurred (see sections 1.g. and 6.d.).

=== Prohibition of child labor and minimum age for employment ===
There were laws to protect children from exploitation in the workplace; however, neither the Ministry of Labor, responsible for enforcement, nor labor unions effectively enforced child labor laws. The law sets the minimum age for work at 16, and a ministerial order sets the minimum age for hazardous work at 18. .

Child labor is mainly found in the informal sector, such as artisanal mining and subsistence agriculture, as well as child soldiers, water sellers, domestic workers, and entertainers in bars and restaurants. The commercial sexual exploitation of children is also reported; as is labor by security forces.

In the past, several mining regions (including Katanga, Western and Eastern Kasai, and North and South Kivu, children performed dangerous, often underground, mine work). Children in the mining sector often received less than 10 percent of the pay adults received for the same production, according to the Solidarity Center. In 2020 the Ministry of Mines announced plans to inspect child labor in artisanal mines but this was delayed due to Covid.

In 2016 the National Labor Committee adopted an action plan to fight the worst forms of child labor, but this has not been implemented.

=== Acceptable conditions of work ===
In 2006, employers often did not respect the minimum wage law of $1.00 per day. The average monthly wage did not provide a decent standard of living for a worker and family in the formal economy. Government salaries remained low, ranging from $50 to $110 (26,500 to 58,300 Congolese francs) per month, and salary arrears were common throughout the public sector. More than 90 percent of laborers worked in subsistence agriculture or informal commerce. Many relied on extended family for support. The Ministry of Labor was responsible for enforcing the minimum wage but did not do so effectively.

In 2020, the law defined different standard workweeks for different jobs, ranging from 45 to 72 hours per week. The law also prescribed rest periods and premium pay for overtime, but this was often not respected in practice. The law established no monitoring or enforcement mechanism, and businesses often ignored these standards in practice.

The law specifies health and safety standards; however, the Ministry of Labor did not effectively enforce them. No provisions of the law enable workers to remove themselves from dangerous work situations without jeopardizing their employment.

According to Global Witness, workers in the formal mining sector, as well as illegal diggers, faced particular risks. Most worked with no protective clothing, equipment, or training. Scores died during the year, usually in mineshaft collapses, and companies provided no compensation upon death. It is estimated that there were more than one million miners working outside the formal sector nationwide. Many suffered violence from guards and security forces for illegally entering mining concessions.

== Historical situation ==
The following chart shows the Democratic Republic of the Congo's ratings since 1972 in the Freedom in the World reports, published annually by Freedom House. A rating of 1 is "free"; 7, "not free".^{1}

Historical ratings

| Year | Political Rights | Civil Liberties | Status | President^{2} |
| 1972 | 7 | 6 | Not Free | Mobutu Sese Seko |
| 1973 | 7 | 6 | Not Free | Mobutu Sese Seko |
| 1974 | 7 | 6 | Not Free | Mobutu Sese Seko |
| 1975 | 7 | 7 | Not Free | Mobutu Sese Seko |
| 1976 | 7 | 6 | Not Free | Mobutu Sese Seko |
| 1977 | 6 | 6 | Not Free | Mobutu Sese Seko |
| 1978 | 6 | 6 | Not Free | Mobutu Sese Seko |
| 1979 | 6 | 6 | Not Free | Mobutu Sese Seko |
| 1980 | 6 | 6 | Not Free | Mobutu Sese Seko |
| 1981 | 6 | 6 | Not Free | Mobutu Sese Seko |
| 1982^{3} | 6 | 6 | Not Free | Mobutu Sese Seko |
| 1983 | 6 | 7 | Not Free | Mobutu Sese Seko |
| 1984 | 6 | 7 | Not Free | Mobutu Sese Seko |
| 1985 | 7 | 7 | Not Free | Mobutu Sese Seko |
| 1986 | 7 | 7 | Not Free | Mobutu Sese Seko |
| 1987 | 6 | 7 | Not Free | Mobutu Sese Seko |
| 1988 | 6 | 7 | Not Free | Mobutu Sese Seko |
| 1989 | 7 | 6 | Not Free | Mobutu Sese Seko |
| 1990 | 6 | 6 | Not Free | Mobutu Sese Seko |
| 1991 | 6 | 5 | Not Free | Mobutu Sese Seko |
| 1992 | 6 | 5 | Not Free | Mobutu Sese Seko |
| 1993 | 7 | 6 | Not Free | Mobutu Sese Seko |
| 1994 | 7 | 6 | Not Free | Mobutu Sese Seko |
| 1995 | 7 | 6 | Not Free | Mobutu Sese Seko |
| 1996 | 7 | 6 | Not Free | Mobutu Sese Seko |
| 1997 | 7 | 6 | Not Free | Mobutu Sese Seko |
| 1998 | 7 | 6 | Not Free | Laurent-Désiré Kabila |
| 1999 | 7 | 6 | Not Free | Laurent-Désiré Kabila |
| 2000 | 7 | 6 | Not Free | Laurent-Désiré Kabila |
| 2001 | 6 | 6 | Not Free | Laurent-Désiré Kabila |
| 2002 | 6 | 6 | Not Free | Joseph Kabila |
| 2003 | 6 | 6 | Not Free | Joseph Kabila |
| 2004 | 6 | 6 | Not Free | Joseph Kabila |
| 2005 | 6 | 6 | Not Free | Joseph Kabila |
| 2006 | 5 | 6 | Not Free | Joseph Kabila |
| 2007 | 5 | 6 | Not Free | Joseph Kabila |
| 2008 | 6 | 6 | Not Free | Joseph Kabila |
| 2009 | 6 | 6 | Not Free | Joseph Kabila |
| 2010 | 6 | 6 | Not Free | Joseph Kabila |
| 2011 | 6 | 6 | Not Free | Joseph Kabila |

Freedom House changed their ranking system and in 2023, they scored DRC as follows;

- Political Rights = 4 out of 40
- Civil Liberties = 15 out of 60
- TOTAL = 19 out of 100

The highest scoring areas were Religious Freedom (3/4) and Academic Freedom (2/4).

== International treaties ==
The Democratic Republic of the Congo's stances on international human rights treaties are as follows:

International treaties

| Treaty | Organization | Introduced | Signed | Ratified |
| Convention on the Prevention and Punishment of the Crime of Genocide | United Nations | 1948 | - | 1962 |
| International Convention on the Elimination of All Forms of Racial Discrimination | United Nations | 1966 | - | 1976 |
| International Covenant on Economic, Social and Cultural Rights | United Nations | 1966 | - | 1976 |
| International Covenant on Civil and Political Rights | United Nations | 1966 | - | 1976 |
| First Optional Protocol to the International Covenant on Civil and Political Rights | United Nations | 1966 | - | 1976 |
| Convention on the Non-Applicability of Statutory Limitations to War Crimes and Crimes Against Humanity | United Nations | 1968 | - | - |
| International Convention on the Suppression and Punishment of the Crime of Apartheid | United Nations | 1973 | - | 1978 |
| Convention on the Elimination of All Forms of Discrimination against Women | United Nations | 1979 | 1980 | 1986 |
| Convention against Torture and Other Cruel, Inhuman or Degrading Treatment or Punishment | United Nations | 1984 | - | 1996 |
| Convention on the Rights of the Child | United Nations | 1989 | 1990 | 1990 |
| Second Optional Protocol to the International Covenant on Civil and Political Rights, aiming at the abolition of the death penalty | United Nations | 1989 | - | - |
| International Convention on the Protection of the Rights of All Migrant Workers and Members of Their Families | United Nations | 1990 | - | - |
| Optional Protocol to the Convention on the Elimination of All Forms of Discrimination against Women | United Nations | 1999 | - | - |
| Optional Protocol to the Convention on the Rights of the Child on the Involvement of Children in Armed Conflict | United Nations | 2000 | 2000 | 2001 |
| Optional Protocol to the Convention on the Rights of the Child on the Sale of Children, Child Prostitution and Child Pornography | United Nations | 2000 | - | 2001 |
| Convention on the Rights of Persons with Disabilities | United Nations | 2006 | - | - |
| Optional Protocol to the Convention on the Rights of Persons with Disabilities | United Nations | 2006 | - | - |
| International Convention for the Protection of All Persons from Enforced Disappearance | United Nations | 2006 | - | - |
| Optional Protocol to the International Covenant on Economic, Social and Cultural Rights | United Nations | 2008 | 2010 | - |
| Optional Protocol to the Convention on the Rights of the Child on a Communications Procedure | United Nations | 2011 | - | - |

== See also ==
- Freedom of religion in the Democratic Republic of the Congo
- Human trafficking in the Democratic Republic of the Congo
- LGBT rights in the Democratic Republic of the Congo
- Politics of the Democratic Republic of the Congo

== Notes ==
1.Note that the "Year" signifies the "Year covered". Therefore the information for the year marked 2008 is from the report published in 2009, and so on.
2.As of January 1.
3.The 1982 report covers the year 1981 and the first half of 1982, and the following 1984 report covers the second half of 1982 and the whole of 1983. In the interest of simplicity, these two aberrant "year and a half" reports have been split into three year-long reports through interpolation.
