= Bau =

Bau or BAU may refer to:

== Places ==
- Bau (island) in Fiji
- Bau District, Fiji
- Bau (village), Fiji
- Bau, Sarawak, a mining town in Malaysia
- Bau, Sudan, in Blue Nile State, also Bau, Baw, Bāw, Darfung, Wisho or Wisko
- Bauru Airport, Brazil, IATA airport code

== Organizations and institutions ==
- Bahçeşehir University, Istanbul, Turkey
- Bangladesh Agricultural University, Bangladesh
- Behavioral Analysis Unit of the US FBI
- Beirut Arab University
- Baekseok Arts University, Seoul, South Korea

== Other uses ==
- Bau (surname)
- Bau (goddess), in Sumerian and Akkadian mythology
- Bau (musician) (born 1962), Cape Verdean musician
- Bau language (disambiguation)
- Bau (plant), genus of flowering plants
- Business as usual (disambiguation)
- Bau (album), a 2006 Mina album
- Binding antibody unit, a unit defined by the WHO for the comparison of assays detecting the same class of immunoglobulins with the same specificity
- Popular phrase by Fuwamoco

== See also ==
- Ba U
