= Business New Zealand =

Business New Zealand Inc. (operating as BusinessNZ) is New Zealand's largest business-advocacy body. It is headquartered in Wellington. Kirk Hope has served as the chief executive since 2016.

== History ==
The history of BusinessNZ dates back more than 100 years. In 1902 several regional employers' associations came together to form the New Zealand Employers Federation, in order to present a unified employer voice in collective bargaining and labour disputes arbitrated by the Arbitration Court.

In 1905 the constitution of the Employers Federation of New Zealand was formally adopted. By 1908 the Federation represented around 6,000 members.

In 1951 the Employers Federation became an incorporated society and by 1971 represented around 10,000 members.

In 2001 the New Zealand Employers Federation merged with the New Zealand Manufacturers Federation to form Business New Zealand (BusinessNZ), advancing the scope of the new organisation to cover greater numbers and types of businesses.
