= Business (disambiguation) =

Business is the activity of making one's living or making money by producing or buying-and-selling goods or services.

Business may also refer to:

== Economics ==
- a business: an organization (company or enterprise, for example) involved in the trade of goods, services, or both, with consumers
- the business sector – the combined activity of all company-based trading and industrial activity in an economy
- trade, the transfer of the ownership of goods or services from one person or entity to another in exchange for other goods or services or for money
- an individual industry, such as "the meat business" or "the oil business"
- an individual line of business within an industry, such as "the bacon business" within "the meat business" or "a ball-bearing line" within "a bearing business"
- business studies, a field of study that deals with the principles of business, management, and economics

== Media ==
- Business, 1972, an album by Canadian band, Young
- "Business" (song), a single by Eminem
- Business (EP), an EP by Jet Lag Gemini
- Business (newspaper), a weekly business newspaper in Ukraine
- "Business" (Aitch song), a song by Aitch featuring Avelino
- Business (TV channel), Ukrainian TV channel
- Business (film), a 1960 French film

== Other uses ==
- business class on airlines
- business route, a type of highway in North America
- a group of ferrets
- Business, a term used in Australian Aboriginal English in a distinctive way to mean matters
  - Secret women's business, pertaining to a controversy about the building of a bridge
  - Sorry business, mourning or funeral practices

== See also ==
- The Business (disambiguation)
- Business as usual (disambiguation)
