= Business class (disambiguation) =

Business class usually refers to a class of seating, a division of accommodation found first on airlines, and later in other transport and hospitality industries.

Business class may also refer to:

- Merchant class, a social class
- Businesspeople collectively
- Business Class, a trim class found in the mainframe computer line IBM Z
- Freightliner Business Class M2, medium-duty trucks
- Freightliner Business Class (FL-Series), medium-duty trucks

== See also ==
- Business class airline
- business (disambiguation)
- class (disambiguation)
