= Kateryna Babkina =

Ukrainian writer (born 1985)

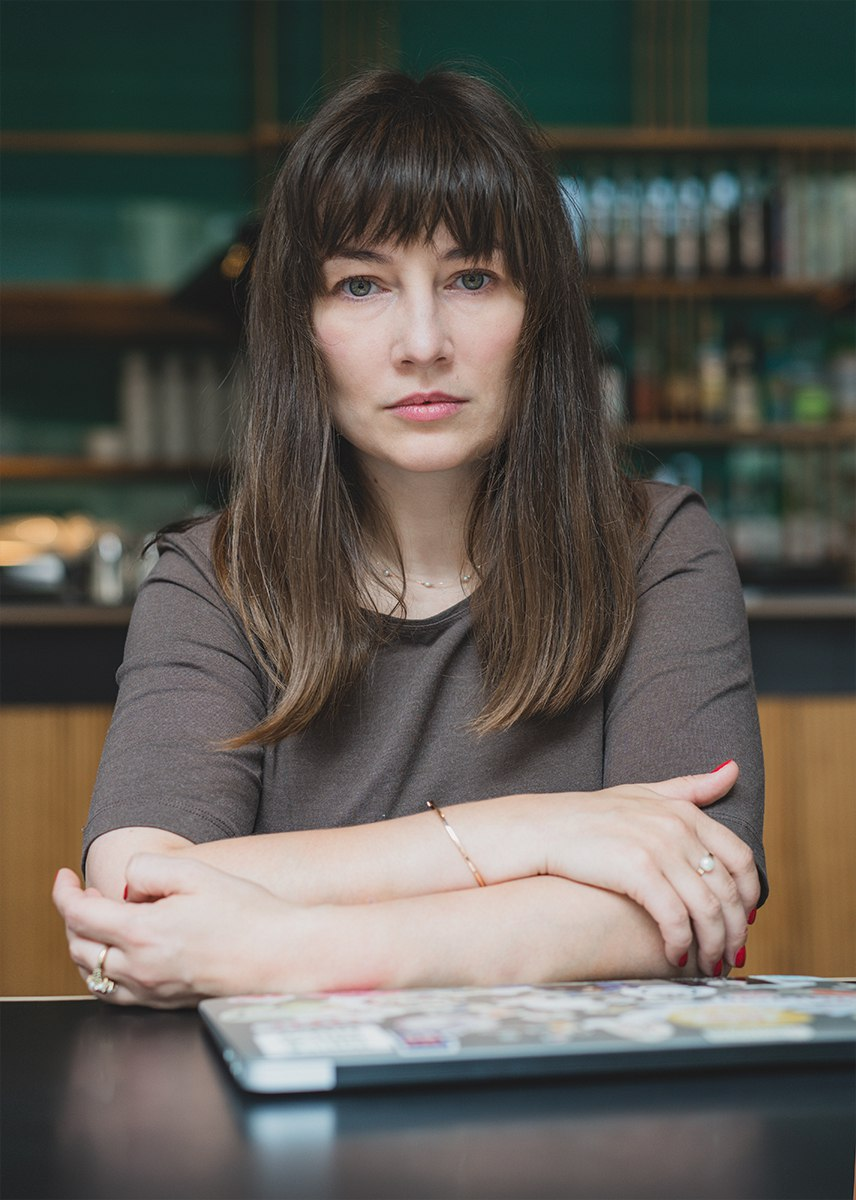
- Born: July 22, 1985 (age 40); Ivano-Frankivsk, Ukraine
- Occupation: Writer

Kateryna Babkina (Ukrainian: Катерина Бабкіна) (born 22 July 1985) is a Ukrainian poet, short story writer, novelist, playwright and screenwriter. The winner of Angelus Central European Literature Award (2021).

== Career ==
Babkina was born in Ivano-Frankivsk, Ukraine in 1985. She attended Taras Shevchenko National University of Kyiv to study journalism and graduated in 2007, going on to work as a freelance journalist.

She worked as a contributing editor for Esquire in Ukraine (2012–2014). She also has had articles published in Focus, Business and Le Monde amongst others.

Babkina was the first Ukrainian author to have her readings at the Library of Congress, USA.

Her book My Grandfather Danced the Best won the 2021 Angelus Award. In 2022, Babkina's novella for children "Cappy and the Whale" was published in translation by Penguin Random House, UK. In April 2023, the e-book "Mom, do you remember?" was published in Ukrainian (Warstwy, Poland). In October 2023, the book "Mom, do you remember?" was published in Polish, translated by Bohdan Zadura. In July 2024, it was published in hardcover in Ukrainian by Bilka publishing house.

== Published work ==
=== Poetry ===
- St Elmo's Fire (2002)
- The Mustard (2011)
- Painkillers and Sleeping Pills (2014)
- Charmed for Love (2017)
- Does not hurt (2021)

=== Short story collections ===
- Lilu After You (2008)
- Schaslyvi holi lyudy (Happy Naked People) (2016)

=== Novels ===
- Sonia (2013)
- My Grandfather Danced the Best (2019)

=== Screenplays ===
- Evil, as part of the 2013 Kinofest NYC festival

=== Plays ===
- Hamlet.Babylon (2016), an adaptation of Shakespeare's Hamlet

=== Children's stories ===
- Harbuzovyi rik (The Pumpkin Year) (2014)
- Шапочка і кит (The Hat and the Whale) (2015)
- Girls's power (2018, co-authored with Mark Livin)
- Snow heaty (2022)

=== Translated books ===
- poetry collection Ask for the same for all (Haver Laet Publishing House, Israel)
- novel Sonia (Warsztaty Kultury, Poland)
- novel Heute Fahre Ich nach Morgen (Haymon Verlag, Austria)
- a collection of short stories Szczęśliwi nadzy ludzie (Warsztaty Kultury Publishing House, Poland)
- short story collection Happy naked people (VINTAGEbooks, Cyprus)
- novel Nikt tak nie tańczył jak mój dziadek (Warsztaty Kultury Publishing House, Poland)
- novella for children Cappy and the Whale (Penguin Random House, UK)
- novel Moj deda je plesao bolje od svih (Blum izdavaštvo, Serbia)
