= Human trafficking in the Democratic Republic of the Congo =

The Democratic Republic of the Congo (DRC) ratified the 2000 UN TIP Protocol in October 2005.

In 2010, the country was a source and destination country for men, women, and children subjected to trafficking in persons, specifically conditions of forced labor and forced prostitution. The majority of this trafficking was internal, and much of it was perpetrated by armed groups and government forces outside government control within the DRC's unstable eastern provinces.

In 2010 the Government of the Democratic Republic of the Congo did not fully comply with the minimum standards for the elimination of trafficking and did not make significant efforts to do so. The government did not show evidence of progress in prosecuting and punishing labor or sex trafficking offenders, including members of its own armed forces, providing protective services for the vast majority of trafficking victims, or raising public awareness of human trafficking. In addition, the government's anti-trafficking law enforcement efforts decreased during the 2010 reporting period.

The U.S. State Department's Office to Monitor and Combat Trafficking in Persons placed the country in "Tier 3" in 2017. By 2023 the country was placed at Tier 2.

== Realms in 2010 ==
A significant number of unlicensed Congolese artisanal miners - men and boys - are exploited in situations of debt bondage by businessmen and supply dealers from whom they acquire cash advances, tools, food, and other provisions at inflated prices, and to whom they must sell the mined minerals at prices below the market value. The miners are forced to continue to work to repay constantly accumulating debts that are virtually impossible to repay. In North Kivu, South Kivu, and Katanga provinces, armed groups and Congolese national army (FARDC) troops reportedly use threats and coercion to force men and children to mine for minerals.

A number of policemen in eastern DRC reportedly arrested people arbitrarily in order to extort money from them. Those who could not pay were forced to work until they had "earned" their freedom. Congolese girls are forced into prostitution in tent- or hut-based brothels or informal camps - including in markets and mining areas - by loosely organized networks, gangs, and madams. Congolese women and children are exploited internally in conditions of involuntary domestic servitude and taken, in smaller numbers, to Angola, South Africa, Republic of the Congo, and European nations for commercial sexual exploitation. Some members of Batwa, or pygmy groups, are subjected to conditions of involuntary servitude in agriculture, mining, and domestic work in eastern DRC.

Indigenous and foreign armed militia groups, notably, the Democratic Forces for the Liberation of Rwanda (FDLR), Patriotes Résistants Congolais (PARECO), various local militia (Mai-Mai), the Alliance of Patriots for a Free and Sovereign Congo (APCLS), and the Lord's Resistance Army (LRA), continued to abduct and forcibly recruit Congolese men, women, and children to serve as laborers, porters, domestics, combatants, and in sexual servitude. In 2009, the LRA continued operations in areas in and near the DRC's Orientale Province, violently abducting more than 1,700 Congolese citizens, including children. Some of these abductees were later taken to southern Sudan or the Central African Republic. Likewise, abducted Sudanese and Central African citizens experienced conditions of forced labor and sexual servitude at the hands of the LRA after being forcibly taken to the DRC.

In 2009, the FARDC resumed recruitment, at times through force, of children for use as combatants, escorts, and porters, a practice which observers believed to have ended by 2008. From November 2008 to October 2009, 623 confirmed cases of unlawful child soldier recruitment were attributed to the FARDC, 75 percent of which were attributable to ex-CNDP (National Congress for the Defense of the People, a former Congolese rebel group) elements absorbed into the FARDC in 2009. In April 2009, for example, 100 children, ages 13 to 15, were recruited by the FARDC along the Bunyakiri-Hombo axis.

An unspecified number of children recruited by the CNDP during past reporting periods remain within integrated FARDC units. In addition, FARDC elements pressed hundreds of civilians, including children, into forced labor to carry ammunition, supplies, and looted goods, to fetch water and firewood, to serve as guides, or to construct military facilities and temporary huts. Those who resisted were sometimes killed. Others died under the weight of their heavy loads.

Elements of the national army perpetrated severe human trafficking abuses in 2010, including forcibly recruiting hundreds of children and using local populations to perform forced labor. Some army commanders blocked efforts to remove children from their units. Furthermore, a number of FARDC commanders accused of child soldiering and forced labor abuses in previous reporting periods remained in leadership positions within the army and were not investigated, disciplined in any way, or brought to trial. Therefore, the Democratic Republic of the Congo is placed on Tier 3. The government continued to lack sufficient financial, technical, and human resources to effectively address trafficking crimes and provide basic levels of security and social services in most parts of the country.

The military lacked the capacity to demobilize armed groups or adequately prevent the trafficking violations committed by members of its own forces. The country's criminal and military justice systems, including the police, courts, and prisons were practically nonexistent; there were few functioning courts or secure prisons in the country. Some advances, however, were noted during the reporting period in demobilizing children from fighting factions, including from the national army, and in sensitizing military officials about the illegality of committing forced labor abuses.

== History ==
Between 1996 and 2003, the Rwandan Patriotic Front/Rwandan Patriotic Army (RPF/RPA) entered the Democratic Republic of the Congo to kill Hutu refugees and anti-Tutsis who had fled to the DRC to escape the Rwandan Genocide. RPF/RPA was led by General Paul Kagame, who ended the genocide of Tutsis in Rwanda. After allying with the Alliance of Democratic Forces for the Liberation of Congo (AFDL), Kagame was given reason for “entree into the DRC for the sole reason of going after Hutu refugees.”

The Tutsi-led armies killed innocent citizens, including women, children, and the elderly. In the First Congo War, the conflict that resulted from this invasion, Laurent-Désiré Kabila, leader of the AFDL and opponent to President Mobutu, took power in May 1997. He subsequently exiled Mobutu from the DRC.

The desired elimination of Hutus by Kabila was unsuccessful and disliked by Rwanda, which led to the Second Congo War. In 1998, a group of African powers, headed by Rwanda, sought to remove Kabila from power. His assassination in office led to the rise of Joseph Kabila, his son. The war ended with the Pretoria Accords in 2002, signed between the DRC and Rwanda. Since the beginning of the wars, the country has seen numerous human rights violations, as well as human trafficking.

In 2011, the United Nations Human Development Index marked the DRC as 187 out of the 187 countries used for calculation. In 2022, the same index noted that it had slightly improved and had risen to 175 out of 187; the country was scored 48 out of 100 for development.

== Gender-Based Violence ==
From 1996 to 2013, more than 200,000 victims, specifically women and children, were the target of gender-based, sexual violence. More than 8,000 cases of assault from women or girls were reported between January and September of 2008. According to a 2011 report, there is a possibility of over 2 million sexual violence victims across the DRC.

Gender-based violence is used as a method of power during times of conflict. Conflict and gender-based violence symbiotically assist in the “destabilization of [a] region and its people.” The United States Department of State states that human trafficking in the DRC predominantly occurs through the forced prostitution of women and children, child labor in mines, and child soldiers. Reliance on women as providers of survival materials, like water, kindling, and food, makes them more susceptible to abduction. In the eastern region of the Democratic Republic of the Congo, the prominent form of human trafficking is “conflict-based sexual slavery of women and girls.

Information collected by the United Nations Joint Human Rights Office (UNJHRO) from the Democratic Republic of the Congo from January 2010 to December 2013 shows “3,635 incidences of sexual violence (rape and gang rape) by armed groups and state agents.” Within those cases, 73% of those victims were women, 25% were girls, and 2% were men. Additionally, almost 50% of the actions were committed by Congolese state agents, and 35.2% of acts within that category committed by FARDC. The United Nations Population Fund (UNFPA) conducted a study that showed that 39% of sexual, gender-based violence in the provinces of North Kivu, South Kivu, Orientale, Katanga and Maniema, was related to armed conflict and committed by armed people. A survey that was taken from the North Kivu province "showed that 22% of women and 10% of men were victims of sexual violence within the conflict."

Sexual violence has also occurred between different ethnic communities in the Democratic Republic of the Congo. In the Tanganyika province, there has been violence between the militias of the Twa and the Luba. Violence and conflict has moved to the Kasaï province, the Kasaï-central province, and the Kasaï-Oriental province. The anti-government militia Kamuina Nsapu and the pro-government militia Bana Mura’s targeting of civilians has led to increased sexual violence. Examples of actions committed include “victims being raped in front of relatives, a pregnant woman having her fetus ripped out and at least one victim being forced to perform sex acts on a family member before being executed.”

In 2017, the United Nations Organization Stabilization Mission in the Democratic Republic of the Congo (MONUSCO) confirmed 804 cases of sexual violence (507 women, 265 girls, 30 men, and 2 boys). Of those cases, 72% were found to be a result of non-state armed groups. These groups include the “Twa militia and Tanganyika and the Force de resistance patriotique de l’Ituri (FRPI) operating in Irumu territory in Ituri.” On May 1, 2015, an attack on Kikamba in South Kivu led to the rape of 100 women.

In 2017, three cases of sexual violence were resolved within the courts. A FARDC colonel was convicted for “command responsibility for rape as a war crime” in the village of Musenyi. A commander in the Forces démocratiques de libération du Rwanda was convicted for utilizing sexual violence as a war crime in Nzovu. A member of parliament was convicted, along with his militia, for the abduction and rape of 39 children on the grounds of a crime against humanity.

== Trafficking of Children ==
A form of trafficking that also occurs in the Democratic Republic of the Congo is child labor in Rwandan-held mines. In the Kivu and Katanga Provinces, mining serves as the main source of production. A 2010 report revealed that, of the 742 people working in or near the mines, 40% of those people were slaves. Within that percentage, some of the slaves were as young as five years old. Additionally, the Armed Forces of the Democratic Republic of the Congo (FARDC) “executed unarmed children suspected of belonging to the Kamuina Nsapu armed group and supported and collaborated with various proxy militias the recruited and used children.”

Sexual violence is also prevalent within the practice of trafficking children. In 2017, there was an increase in the number of occurrences of sexual violence from FARDC and the Congolese National Police, with many of the victims being children. 41% of the actions committed by members of FARDC and 42% of those committed by Congolese National Police included acts upon children.

In 2023, the Organised Crime Index noted the recruitment of children to work in mines as well as in armed conflict.

== Prosecution (2010) ==
The government made little progress in investigating or prosecuting suspected trafficking offenders during the reporting period. The government's judicial writ did not cover many areas of the country where human trafficking occurs, and it remained hamstrung by a critical shortage of magistrates, clerks, and lawyers. Corrupt officials allegedly embezzled meager financial resources from government agencies responsible for combating human trafficking, further disabling the government from pursuing training, capacity building, or victim assistance.

In February and March 2010, the government recruited 2,000 new magistrates, who will be appointed and receive training during the upcoming reporting period. Existing laws do not prohibit all forms of labor trafficking. However, the July 2006 sexual violence statute, Law 6/018, specifically prohibits sexual slavery, sex trafficking, child and forced prostitution, and pimping, prescribing penalties for these offenses of 10 to 20 years' imprisonment. These penalties are sufficiently stringent and commensurate with those prescribed for rape. The Child Protection Code (Law 09/001) which criminalizes and prescribes penalties of five to 20 years' imprisonment for child slavery and trafficking, child commercial sexual exploitation, and the enlistment of children into the armed forces – was published in May 2009. However, it remains unimplemented and without the necessary budget.

During the reporting period, child protection police in Bukavu arrested a Congolese woman for allegedly tricking a 13-year-old Congolese girl into accompanying her to Burundi, where she intended to force the girl into prostitution; police transmitted her dossier to the Bukavu court for prosecution in February 2010. The status of the March 2009 case involving the arrest of a Bukavu nightclub owner for allegedly prostituting 10 girls and seven boys in his facility is unknown; the nightclub has reopened.

In June 2009, a military tribunal in Kisangani convicted five Mai-Mai members of, among other things, crimes against humanity; these defendants were also initially charged with, but not convicted of, perpetrating acts of forced labor against local populations. Bedi Mubuli Engangela (a.k.a. Colonel 106), a former Mai-Mai commander suspected of insurrection and war crimes, including the conscription of children, appeared before a military tribunal in early 2010 and remains in detention at Malaka Prison in Kinshasa; the court awaits the conclusion of the investigation before setting a trial date.

Unlike in previous reporting periods, the government neither brought charges against nor prosecuted any individual suspected of conscripting or using child soldiers. In November 2009, the UN Group of Experts on the DRC published the names of 21 current FARDC commanders alleged to have committed human rights abuses. 13 are implicated in the unlawful recruitment and use of child soldiers and three are alleged to have obtained or maintained the forced labor of local populations. Lieutenant Colonel Jean-Pierre Biyoyo, formerly of the Mudundu-40 armed group and the first person convicted by Congolese courts of conscripting children, has not been re-apprehended since his escape from prison in June 2006 and is currently serving as the Commander of FARDC's Sector 3 of the Amani Leo campaign in Walungu, South Kivu.

"Captain Gaston", an armed group commander allegedly responsible for the mid-2006 murder of an NGO child protection advocate, remained at large in Kitshanga, North Kivu, during the reporting period. His January 2007 arrest warrant has not been executed and, after being promoted by the FARDC to the rank of Major, he is leading a FARDC battalion between Ngungu and Karuba.

== Protection (2010) ==
The government assisted in the identification and demobilization of child soldiers during the reporting period, but offered minimal protection to other types of trafficking victims; NGOs provided nearly all of the shelter, legal, medical, and psychological services available to trafficking victims. The government lacked procedures for proactively identifying victims of trafficking among vulnerable groups or referring victims to protective services. Under the National Disarmament, Demobilization, and Reintegration Plan, all ex-combatants, including child soldiers, pass through a common process during which they disarm and receive information about military and civilian reintegration options.

During this process, the National Demobilization Agency (UEPN-DDR), in cooperation with the UN Mission to the DRC (MONUC), separated and transported any identified children to NGO-run centers for temporary housing and vocational training. 2,816 children were demobilized from armed groups, including the FARDC, through this process in 2009. With the assistance of FARDC commanders, a local NGO demobilized 119 children from FARDC units in South Kivu during the first quarter of 2010.

While some of these child soldiers were part of FARDC forces that were fighting in North Kivu in 2008, most of the children originated from former armed groups that had integrated into the FARDC. While the FARDC high command was generally supportive of MONUC's efforts to remove children from its forces during the reporting period, it lacked sufficient command and control to compel many FARDC commanders to comply with standing orders to release their child soldiers, or to prevent ground troops from recruiting additional children or subjecting local populations to forced labor.

Certain FARDC commanders actively blocked efforts by MONUC to separate children from their ranks and some FARDC elements continued to harass, arrest, and physically mistreat children formerly associated with armed groups, including potential trafficking victims. In March 2010, a local NGO trained over 200 FARDC officers on the rights and protection of children in South Kivu; they also educated police, local authorities, and local youth throughout the province on child rights and international and national legislation related to trafficking between January and April 2010.

Although the national government did not address forced labor in the mining sector, provincial Ministries of Education in Orientale, Kasai Oriental, and Katanga coordinated with NGOs to reintegrate children working in mines into the formal education system. Katanga's provincial Ministry of Interior continued to provide funding for the Kasapa residential "welcome center" in Lubumbashi to provide street children, including trafficking victims, with protective services and educational programming. It is unknown whether this center provided protective services to trafficking victims in 2009.

Government officials recognized the growing problem of child prostitution in the DRC, though authorities have yet to take concrete action against it. The government did not show evidence of encouraging victims to assist in investigations against their traffickers. It offered no legal alternatives to the removal of foreign victims to countries in which they may face hardship or retribution. There are, however, few foreign trafficking victims within the DRC, and the government has consistently allowed for the safe repatriation of foreign child soldiers in cooperation with MONUC.

== Prevention (2010) ==
While the government initiated awareness-raising efforts against human rights abuses, including forced labor, committed by its own forces during the year, it made no significant efforts to prevent other forms of human trafficking. The Ministry of Human Rights drafted, but did not disseminate, a document on the country's current trafficking situation, including challenges to addressing it and recommendations for action. In July 2009, the FARDC's Goma headquarters issued a press statement reminding all soldiers and commanders of their duty to protect the civilian population and noted "zero tolerance" for human rights abuses, specifically citing the crime of forced labor, among others.

The notice warned commanders that they would be held accountable for actions committed by troops under their command; this notice was not enforced with concrete law enforcement action. In April 2010, Major Andoga, of the 1331th Battalion, conducted a sensitization campaign on human rights violations and the military's zero tolerance policy in both Kinshasa and the eastern provinces. Although the National Ministry of Labor is responsible for investigating forced child labor and it employs 150 inspectors nationwide, the ministry did not conduct any forced child labor investigations in 2009. Inspectors often lacked means of transport or resources to carry out their work.

The provincial Ministry of Labor in Katanga participated in a tripartite dialogue with unions and mining companies on the effect of the financial crisis on youth labor; the dialogue achieved no meaningful outcomes. Newly established provisional Worst Forms of Child Labor Committees in Katanga, Kasai Orientale, and Orientale (Ituri District) provinces - composed of staff from various provincial ministries and community members - developed annual work plans for 2010.

With UNICEF funding, the members of the Katanga committee researched, drafted, and printed a brochure on its mandate that was distributed to local authorities, religious and traditional leaders, and community organizations as part of an awareness-raising campaign. The Kasai Orientale committee met with the governor and provincial assembly, after which the governor committed the provincial government to fighting child labor and establishing secondary schools. The government did not take any known measures during the reporting period to reduce the demand for forced labor or commercial sex acts.

== See also ==
- Sexual violence in the Democratic Republic of the Congo
- Prostitution in the Democratic Republic of the Congo
- Women in the Democratic Republic of the Congo

General:

- Crime in the Democratic Republic of the Congo
- Human rights in the Democratic Republic of the Congo
