= Itatiba do Sul =

Municipality in Brazil

Coordinates: 27°23′13″S 52°27′10″W

- Municipality
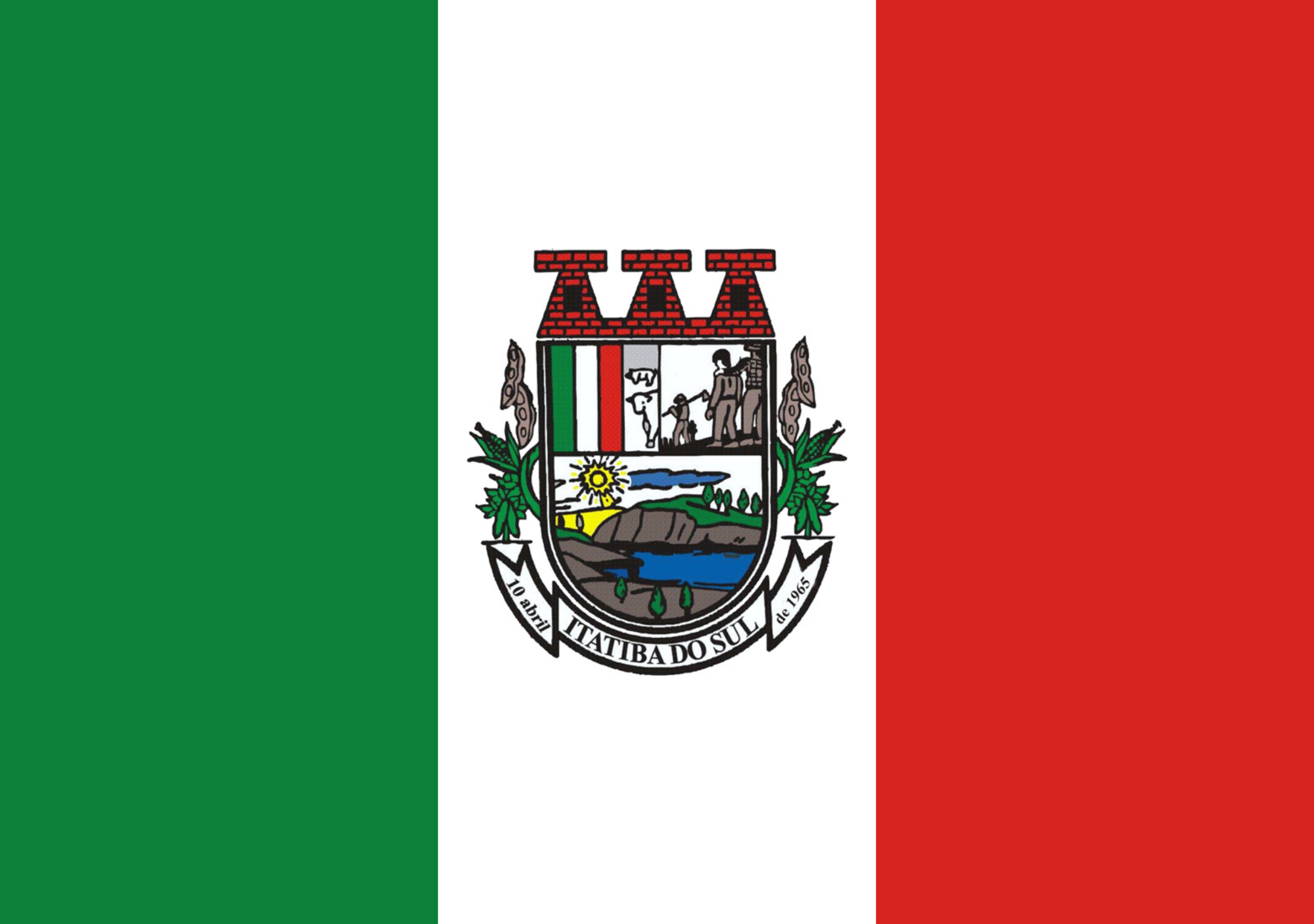
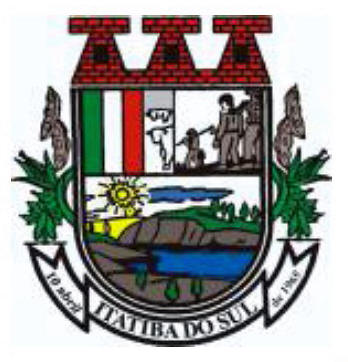
- Flag Coat of arms
- Interactive map of Itatiba do Sul
- Country: Brazil
- Time zone: UTC−3 (BRT)

Itatiba do Sul is a municipality in the state of Rio Grande do Sul, Brazil. As of 2020, the estimated population was 3,231. The city is the birthplace of serial killer Luiz Baú who terrorized Erechim and the surrounding areas, Baú was arrested and sent to a psychiatric hospital in Porto Alegre, where on June 30, 1980, he escaped along with four other inmates and has not been seen ever since.

== See also ==
- List of municipalities in Rio Grande do Sul
