= Mbau =

Mbau is an African surname. Notable people with the surname include:

- Elias Mbau (born 1961), Kenyan politician
- Khanyi Mbau (born 1985), South African actress, television host, and artist
- John Mbau (born 1990), Kenyan scholar.

== See also ==
- Bau (disambiguation)
