= The Business =

The Business may refer to:

== Film and Television ==
- The Business (TV series)
- The Business (TV program), an Australian business program
- The Business (film), a film directed by Nick Love, 2005
- O Negócio ("The Business"), a Brazilian television series

== Music ==
- The Business (band), an English punk rock/Oi! band
- "The Business" (Madness song), the B-side to "Baggy Trousers", 1980
- The Business – the Definitive Singles Collection, a compilation album by Madness, 1993
- "The Business" (Yung Berg song), 2008
- "The Business" a song by X Ambassadors from The Reason, 2014
- "The Business" (Tiësto song), 2020

== Literature ==
- The Business (magazine), a British weekly magazine
- The Business (novel), a novel by Iain Banks, 1999

== Other ==
- The Business, an RTÉ Radio 1 show presented by John Murray
- The Business, a National Public Radio film industry news digest produced by KCRW

== See also ==
- Business
