= Juan Bau =

Spanish singer (born 1948)

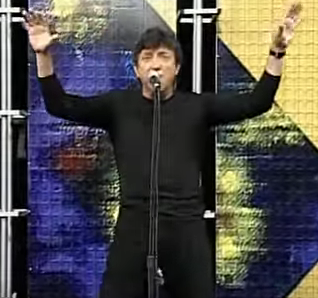
Juan Bau in 2016

Juan Bau (Aldaia; 24 December 1948) is the stage name of Juan Bautista Conca Moya, a Spanish light music singer.

== Biography ==
In 1972 he made his professional debut as a solo artist under the name of Juan Bau and recorded his first single album with the songs 'Pequeñas cosas' and 'Dentro de mi alma', which he composed himself.

In 1973 he released his second single with "Tú no comprendes" and "Sigue tu camino". It was also in this year that he had his big hit with the song "La estrella de David". In 1974 he received his first gold record with the album Penas. Other songs include 'Mi corazón' in 1974, 'Dama del amanecer', 'Natacha y yo' in 1975, 'Acaríciame', 'Fantasía' in 1976 and the super hit with which he almost always starts his live performances, 'Devuélveme el amor' in early 1978. In the 80s there were songs such as "Un paso más", "Hoy me llamará", "Soñaré", "Me gusta así", "Libérate", and "Con las luces apagadas".

After a few years without recording, he released the album Corazonada in 1986, followed by the CD Alma romántica and, in 1999, Nuestras canciones, in which he covered hits by Mocedades, Manuel Alejandro, Sergio and Estíbaliz and José Luis Perales.

In 2003 he released the album Volverte a ver. In 2004 he released the album 30 Años de Éxitos and in 2009 the compilation Super Éxitos de Juan Bau.
