= Politics as usual =

Politics as usual may refer to:

- Politics as Usual (album), a 2008 album by hip-hop artist Termanology
- Politics as Usual (book), a 2010 book by Thomas Pogge
- "Politics as Usual" (Hill Street Blues), a 1981 television episode
- "Politics as Usual", a 1996 song by Jay-Z from the album Reasonable Doubt

== See also ==
- "Not Just Politics as Usual", the tagline of the magazine George
