= United Broadcasting Company =

Radio network in the western United States

United Broadcasting Company, known as The Silver Network, was a West Coast radio network based in Los Angeles, California.

== History ==
On 5 November 1930, at 7:00 PM, operations began, from Los Angeles. Louis L. Davis was Chairman. United Broadcasting Company, Ltd. was at 2614 West Seventh Street, Los Angeles, California.

On 26 February 1931, UBC announced that it had merged with NBS - The Northwest Broadcasting System, owners of KJR (AM) Seattle, KEX (AM) Portland & KGA Spokane. Both chains would run independently.

On 1 April 1931, UBC suspended operations.

== Stations ==
- KFWB Hollywood, Los Angeles, California
- KTM Los Angeles, California
- KTAB San Francisco
- KXA Seattle
- KXL Portland, Oregon
- KGB San Diego, California
- KORE Eugene, Oregon
- KMED Medford, Oregon
- KVOS Bellingham, Washington
