= Luiz Baú =

Brazilian serial killer

- Born: June 21, 1939 (age 87); Itatiba do Sul, Brazil
- Other name: "The Monster of Erechim"
- Conviction: Murder x1

Details
- Victims: 5
- Span of crimes: February 26, 1975; February 12 – 16, 1980
- Country: Brazil
- State: Rio Grande do Sul
- Date apprehended: February 27, 1975; February 21, 1980; currently a fugitive if still alive

Luiz Baú (born June 21, 1939), known as The Monster of Erechim, was a Brazilian serial killer who achieved notoriety in the 1970s for committing five murders in Erechim and Itatiba do Sul.

Born in the district of Sete Lagoas, in Itatiba do Sul, Baú was a farm worker who engaged primarily in agricultural activities, but also posed as a medicine man. After divorcing his wife, possibly due to contracting mumps and becoming sterile, Baú moved to Linha Jubaré, in the home of a widowed woman with seventeen children. He developed a close relationship with one of these children, and after discovering that the boy planned to move to Garibaldi to study at the Seminary, Baú murdered him in a particularly cruel fashion. He was diagnosed as a schizophrenic by doctors at the Forensic Psychiatric Institute Maurício Cardoso and imprisoned in the Erechim State Prison.

Considered an exemplary prisoner, Baú surprised police and prison officers when he escaped in January 1980, a fact which didn't catch the media's attention due to his calm temperament. Between February 12 and 16, Baú committed four murders, killing three boys in the Rio Toldo and Rio Tigre communities, and a farm owner in the Aeroporto district. In all of the cases, his modus operandi was to repeatedly stab the victims to death. The deaths caused a shockwave throughout the community, which mobilized to arrest Luiz Baú.

He was finally arrested on February 21, on the BR-153 Highway, after getting into a struggle with the city's chief police officer. Fearing that he would be lynched by the locals, Baú was transferred to the IPF again and remained there for five months, until he managed to escape again on June 30. Following this, no concrete information is available about his whereabouts.

== Biography ==
Luiz Baú was born on June 21, 1939, to farmers Florindo and Vitória, in the district of Sete Lagoas, Itatiba do Sul, where he lived until he was 28 years of age. Coming from a poor family, he stood out as a working man in the field with great physical strength, who also held the occupation of a medicine man who gave blessings with herbs and teas.

After the deaths of his parents, Baú began arguing with his brother João, due to the fact that the latter would be taking over the family property. Eventually, it resulted in a brawl during which João hit him with a hammer, with Luiz retaliating by shooting his brother in the eye, arm and leg with a shotgun, leaving him with permanent scars for the rest of his life.

After this encounter, Luiz Baú moved to Chapecó, in Santa Catarina, where he began working on his uncle Júlio's farm, marrying one of the female farmhands, Nilde Pinto de Quadros, on October 7, 1967. No public information about his family life exists until 1972, when it became known that the pair's relationship had grown unstable, as Baú had repeatedly been accused of assault and thefts. There were claims that Baú had contracted mumps during this period and had become sterile, which had made his wife divorce him.

== Crimes ==
=== Murder in Linha Jubaré ===
During the winter of 1974, Baú moved to Linha Jubaré in Itatiba do Sul, where he was welcomed into the family of Maria Zarpelon, a widow and mother of seventeen children, who had invited him for work as he was known for his skills in the fields. His work in curandory led him to maintain a close relationship with Francisco, the couple's twelfth child, who suffered from asthma and had been receiving treatment since he was twelve years old.

Their relationship became very close, leading to discussions between Baú, the school teacher, and the local parish's minister, during which Baú demonstrated a feeling of possessiveness over Francisco. After one of the other brothers returned from the military, suspicions that Baú and Francisco were in a homosexual relationship grew. The family were questioning why the pair were in the woods for most of the time, and returned only at dusk. Because of this, the family decided to send off Francisco to a Catholic Church Seminary in Garibaldi. This angered Baú, who blamed the teacher and minister for his decision.

On February 26, 1975, Francisco was asked by his mother to fetch some cornmeal from a mill near his home, going on horseback and passing by some relatives. That same day, Maria told Baú about the decision to send Francisco to the seminary. In response, Baú said that he would be leaving the residence, and wished to leave some money from his wage for Francisco to use at his leisure. However, the boy had gone missing, and when the family started looking for Baú, he was nowhere to be found.

The following day, when passing by some relatives' house, the family believed that Francisco might've stayed over at an acquaintance's place. On the way, they met Baú, who denied knowing any information about the young man's whereabouts; however, the owner of a grocery store reported that he had seen Baú accompanied by Francisco the previous day. When they returned home, one of the brothers found Francisco's horse trotting alone, with blood spots on the harness. This discovery mobilized the community, which scattered to find the young man.

The Aratiba City Police Department conducted a joint search with the residents of Linha Jubaré, and eventually found a body wrapped in bean cloths two days later, in the chapel garden. It was identified as Francisco's, and showed signs of heavy physical aggression. During the autopsy, the report stated the following:

[...] No dia 26 de fevereiro de 1975, em Linha Jubaré, município de Aratiba, pelas 19:00 horas, depois de ligar-se afetivamente à vítima, [...], com treze anos de idade, em razão de seu homossexualismo, o denunciado, cujas ligações homossexuais com a vítima remontava há um ano atrás, prestandose o acusado à pederastia passiva, descobriu que [o menino] estava se preparando para regressar num Seminário em Garibaldi. Irresignado com a iminência da separação, o denunciado, no dia antes mencionado, procurou a vítima encontrando-a quando a mesma retornava de um moinho. Nessa ocasião o denunciado abordou o assunto da separação, dizendo que também iria embora, mas que deixaria suas plantações para a vítima. Depois de uma rápida conversa, foram para o interior de um mato, onde o denunciado prestou-se à pederastia passiva, como acontecia frequentemente entre ele e a vítima. Após a prática homossexual, utilizando-se de um canivete, o acusado produziu profundos cortes no pescoço e na região axilar esquerda da vítima, causando-lhe a morte. Depois disso, amputou o pênis do menor, e, com o auxílio de uma madeira roliça, introduziu aquele órgão no ânus da vítima.

Translated to English, this reads:

[...] On February 26, 1975, in Linha Jubaré, municipality of Aratiba, at 7:00 PM, after affectionately connecting with the victim, [...], at the age of thirteen, due to his homosexuality, the accused, whose homosexual connections with the victim went back a year ago, leading the accused to passive pederasty, he discovered that [the boy] was preparing to move to a Seminar in Garibaldi. Irresigned to the imminence of separation, the accused, on the day mentioned above, sought out the victim and found him returning from a mill. On that occasion, the accused addressed the issue of separation, saying that he should also leave, but that he would leave his crops to the victim. After a quick conversation, they went into the bush, where the accused lent himself to passive pederasty, as often happened between him and the victim. After the homosexual practice, using a pocket knife, the accused produced deep cuts on the victim's neck and left auxiliary region, causing his death. After that, he amputated the minor's penis, and with the help of a wooden stick, he shoved the organ into the victim's anus.

Luiz Baú was arrested while searches were conducted for Francisco's body, with him placing the body near the minister's chapel with intention of incriminating him. The press from across the region reported the crime as being one of the most barbaric committed, with the newspaper A Voz da Serra featuring on the cover of its March 6 issue the headline: "A Beast in Itatiba", with other outlets like Zero Hora also mentioning it on their covers. Baú was taken to the Forensic Psychiatric Institute Maurício Cardoso in Porto Alegre, with the objective that specialists could determine the state of his sanity for the upcoming criminal process. In the subsequent report, it was determined that Baú was a schizophrenic, and on June 28, 1979, he was sentenced to four years and seven months imprisonment.

=== Escape from Erechim State Prison ===
While imprisoned, Baú spent most of his time tending to the vegetable garden, and even supported detainees and law enforcement by providing them with produce from it. He was characterized as an extremely peaceful individual, and was allowed free rein to any part of the prison.

Considered an exemplary prisoner by prison guards, Baú nonetheless was never visited by friends or relatives, but met with the relatives of other prisoners. During one of these meetings, he threatened the family of another murderer that he would burn his house down, a fact which left the Linha Jubaré community alerted for a few months. Still, he was allowed to work at a penal colony in the Frinape neighborhood, about ten kilometers from the prison, in addition to helping out the farm owner of the prison, in the Aeroporto District, which was eight kilometers away from the prison.

On January 20, 1980, Baú was working on the farm when he disappeared around noon. Even after his escape, there was no mobilization of law enforcement to recapture him, and only 23 days later, local and state media began reporting that the "Erechim Psychopath" was gone. During his time, Baú was confirmed to have wandered through several communities in Erechim, Gaurama, Áurea and Getúlio Vargas. He was spotted on February 9 in the vicinity of Povoado Argenta in Erechim, carrying a backpack on his back and noticeably barefoot.

=== Murders in Erechim ===
Upon entering the Rio Toldo community, around February 12, Baú committed his second murder, which was eerily reminiscent of his first one back in 1975. Jandir Cardoso, 12, was out to buy some candles and matches from a warehouse for his parents around 4 PM. When he failed to return home, his family traveled to the warehouse, finding that the boy had purchased the items and then promptly left. Since nobody had seen him since, the community organized a search to find him.

The next day, at 3 PM, Cardoso's body was located by residents who had seen blood dripping from some corn. A machete was found lying in some nearby grass and, under the machete, the body had been buried in a hole upside down. The autopsy report at the Hospital de Caridade de Erechim confirmed that Cardoso had had his anal sphincter ruptured and his genitalia completely amputated.

After this happened, suspicions immediately fell upon Baú, who was ordered to be captured by the Erechim Police. By then, Baú had reached another village, in Rio Tigre, where he would commit two more murders.

On February 15, Gelson Ribeiro and Paulo Grando, both 8, were herding their neighbor's cows about a kilometer away from their home, but didn't manage to return in time. This fact left the boys' parents in distress, who decided to start looking for them, accompanied by twenty other local families. The bodies were subsequently found the next morning, near an area where the boys were known to feed the cattle. Autopsies conducted at the Hospital de Caridade confirmed that they had similar deaths to Cardoso.

Baú attempted to kill another boy on the next day, when he arrived in Povoado Argenta and approached 11-year-old Lindomir Truylia. He chased after the boy into a pottery, but the latter managed to find his father and escape unscathed. When shown a photo of Luiz Baú, the boy identified him as the man who had chased him.

At the end of that day, Baú arrived at the prison farm in the Aeroporto District, where he had worked for several years. Aparicio Amâncio Bueno, 65, was the farm owner and resided there. During the time they lived together, Bueno made his discontent of how the guards treated Baú evident, but was never reprimanded for it. According to contemporary sources, the two encountered each other that night, with Baú subsequently cutting his neck with a knife. He then proceeded to steal clothes, food, a 32-gauge shotgun, a 22 revolver and cartridges.

== Capture ==
During the 32-day manhunt, between Cardoso's death and Baú's capture, the city of Erechim lived in panic and terror, the citizens frightened that Baú could murder anyone, but mainly targeted young boys. Baú was hunted by the Military Brigade and the Civil Police of Erechim, the Public Security Secretariat of Rio Grande do Sul, the Civil Police of Passo Fundo and the Military Firefighters Corps, who sought after him full-time.

Sources at the time said that Baú may have concealed himself in a cave in the Nazzari waterfall, now a spa in the city, but at the time was uninhabited space. Mismatched data on telephone calls made it difficult for the police to work, since according to delegates, Baú had wigs and different disguises, and supposedly received help from a prison official to escape.

His arrest took place on February 21, when he was located on the BR-153. People called the Military Brigade, which sent out a seven-man team to detain him. The reports from the officers stated that after locating Baú, who was eating some food he had bought in a nearby grocery store, they fired around forty shots at the fugitive, but none hit him. The police chief, Alcir Bordin, snuck behind Baú from the forest and fired five shots, the last one grazing the murderer on the neck. When his revolver ran out of ammunition, the policeman and Baú engaged in a scuffle, during which Baú stabbed Bordin in the thigh. However, the officer managed to hit him in the head and knock Baú down, immobilizing him in the process.

The following items were found in Baú's possession when he was arrested:

[...] Four (4) thousand cruzeiros [...], ID card number [...]; electoral title number [...]; one (1) piece of a notebook lined up, in pieces, where the Prayer of the Holy Spirit is read; one (1) double sheet of a notebook, with guidelines and written manuscripts, where the 'Celeste Letter' is read; one (1) Rossi revolver, No. 150885, 22-gauge, nickel plated, bakelite handle; one (1) knife without visible markings, 30-centimeter blade, wooden handle, with a leather sheath; one (1) 36-gauge shotgun number 3886, with a sawn-off barrel, broken stock, with a cartridge in the barrel; one (1) wig, long brown hair, with hair attached to a thin green screen; ten (10) cartridges for 36-caliber shotgun, intact; seven (7) 32-caliber bullets, intact; one (1) 22-caliber bullet, intact; [...] five (5) candles, three still whole and two (2) already used; six (6) 3X4 size photographs, five (5) of women and one (1) of a boy; one (1) volcano bag in greenish to black colors, with handles made of shoelaces; [...] two (2) olive-colored jackets, in woolen fabrics, used by the Military Brigade or National Army; [...] one (1) disposable type blue gas lighter; [...]. The objects previously mentioned were placed in the possession of LUIZ BAÚ, upon his arrest on 02/21/80 [...].

The identity card and electoral title that Baú carried was someone else's, probably stolen so that he could pass himself off as another individual. His arrest was featured in multiple newspapers at the time, such as A Voz da Serra, Correio do Povo and Zero Hora.

== Hospitalization in Porto Alegre and alleged death ==
After the criminal's arrest, the Military Brigade was afraid that the locals would lynch Baú. A Voz da Serra reported in its February 23 edition that about 500 people were lined up at the Military Brigade's headquarters, where they demanded that the killer be lynched; in the meantime, Correio do Povo confirmed that on the same day, residents were heard chanting "murderer", "does not deserve to live" and "we want a lynching".

Baú was taken to the Forensic Psychiatric Institute Maurício Cardoso, where he put under heavy guard. No reports were given regarding his behavior within the institute, but it is believed that he took most of his time planning ways to escape, succeeding after five months. Together with four other inmates, he managed to escape again on June 30, when the padlock in the courtyard burst open.

The four other inmates were recaptured and returned to the institute, but Baú was never heard from again. When he escaped, newspapers reported the event, reigniting the fears of the local population, with rural schools in Porto Alegre closing down until the criminal was recaptured. It has been claimed that Baú was killed by security agents near Lake Guaíba, given the severity of his crimes. Other theories suggest that he may have fled to Paraná, or the neighboring countries of Uruguay and Paraguay.

His trial was scheduled for March 26, 1984, and when they failed to capture him, he was tried in absentia. The Criminal Court of the District of Erechim put out an arrest warrant on April 3, 1985. According to the current law, the statute of limitations ended in 2005, and the government awarded the victims' families R$3,900.

== See also ==
- List of fugitives from justice who disappeared
- List of serial killers in Brazil

== Bibliography ==
- Rocha, Humberto José da (2008). The 'Monster of Erechim': a case study on the imagination of fear (1980) (in Portuguese). Edifapes.
