= University Baptist Church =

University Baptist Church may refer to:

- University Baptist Church (Austin, Texas), in Austin, Texas, listed on the U.S. National Register of Historic Places
- University Baptist Church, in Baltimore, MD, close to Johns Hopkins University
- University Baptist Church (Jacksonville, Florida), affiliated with University Christian School
