= Bau language =

The Bau language may be the:

- Fijian language
- Bau language (New Guinea)
- Bau Bidayuh language (Borneo)
- Kulang dialect of the Gaam language
