= Business (newspaper) =

Business (Russian: Би́знес; Ukrainian: Бізне с) is a Ukrainian Russian-language weekly business newspaper published every Monday.

== 1992–1994 ==
The newspaper was first published in Kyiv in November 1992. The idea was put forward by Sergey Melnichuk. The motto of the publication was "Read! Think! Do!" The first two years of Business was a collection of leaflets about buying and selling. Sergei Melnichuk directly supervised the release.

== 1994–1998 ==
In 1994 he decided to broaden the focus to provide economic news and analysis material. That same year Konstantin Donin became editor in chief. Melnichuk tried to expand to three regions, issuing three regional newspapers: Business-Donbass, Business-Kharkov and Business-Crimea. All publications were issued in Russian.

During 1994–1995, the newspaper developed rapidly working with advertisers.

In 1996 the newspaper added a colored cover and raised ad rates. Profitability reached 300% and monthly advertising revenues reached $1.5 million.

In 1996–1997 a group of journalists left Business to work in the newspaper Business Week, but the financial crisis in 1998 buried the rival.

== 1998–2002 ==
In February 1998 the producing editor of Business was intended to be Kramaranko Alexander, who also headed the department "of the Company and the markets." The 1998 financial crisis hit Ukrainian business media, but was overcome in 2000.

Today, weekly circulation is over 60,000 copies, including 44,000 delivered subscriptions.

In April 2002 the chief editor left for Kostyanstyn Donin, a newspaper headed by Igor Vlasjuk.

== 2003–present ==
In 2003, Business began to change the concept design and started color printing.

== Editors ==
Editors:

- 1992–1994 – Sergey Melnichuk
- 1994–2002 – Konstantin Donin
- 2002–2003 – Igor Vlasjuk
- 2003–2005 – Igor Kanevsky
- 2006–2008 – Sergey Kobyshev
- 2008–2014 - Igor Sergeyev
- 2014–2016 - Igor Kanevsky
- 2016 – Viacheslav Myronenko

== Sources ==
- Moskalevych I. "Blitz-Inform": the arrest as a stimulus for sale? Mirror of the week (RUS)
- Glavred "Business" resigned because of the ban rozliduvaty activity Tretyakov. Journalist (RUS)
- Statement of journalists "Business" about the pressure (in Russian)
- Journalists "Business" release (in Russian)
- S. Кобышев: "I am proud that работаю in" Business "(in Russian)
- Deputy chief editor of "Business" threatened (RUS)
- In the newspaper "Business" will be the new editor (RUS)
- EDAPS appeal against the "business" (in Russian)
