= Business (TV channel) =

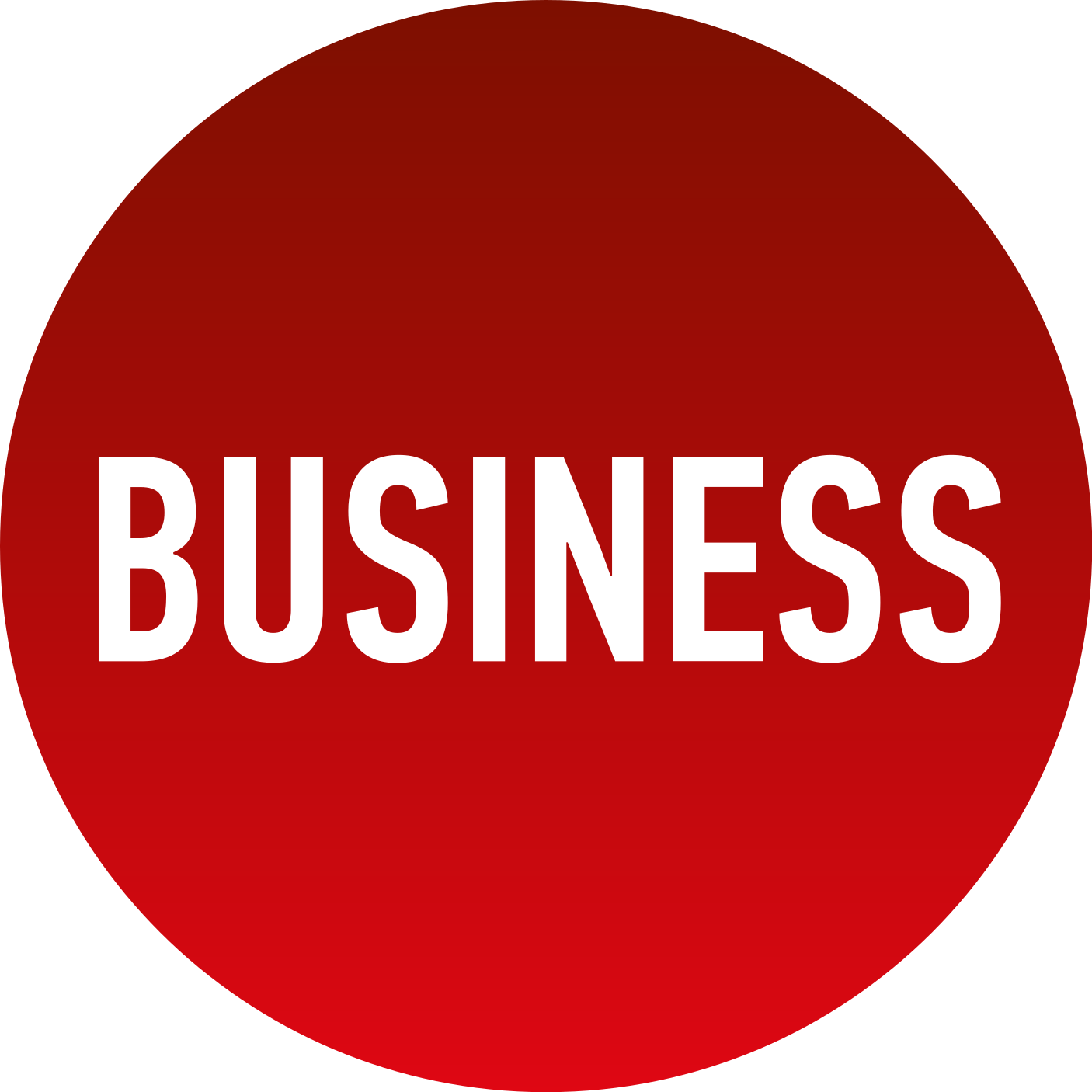

Business (later – Ukrainian Business Channel, UBC) – first Ukrainian specialized TV channel for business-community. Established in 2007, disestablished in 2017.

== History ==
- June 27, 2007 – TV channel was licensed.
- September 1, 2007 – began working under the name UBC.
- November 18, 2008 – CEO of TV channel appointed Olexandr Salomakha.
- November 22, 2009 – first program in English.
- 2011 – 30% of TV channel bought the Ukrainian Business Group. Fired 40 employees.
- December 26, 2011 – UBC changed its name to Business.
- August 1, 2017 - channel shut down

== Audience ==
The main audience of the channel was the business community.
