= List of acronyms: U =

This list contains acronyms, initialisms, and pseudo-blends that begin with the letter U.

For the purposes of this list:

- acronym = an abbreviation pronounced as if it were a word, e.g., SARS = severe acute respiratory syndrome, pronounced to rhyme with cars
- initialism = an abbreviation pronounced wholly or partly using the names of its constituent letters, e.g., CD = compact disc, pronounced cee dee
- pseudo-blend = an abbreviation whose extra or omitted letters mean that it cannot stand as a true acronym, initialism, or portmanteau (a word formed by combining two or more words).

(a) = acronym, e.g.: SARS – (a) severe acute respiratory syndrome
(i) = initialism, e.g.: CD – (i) compact disc
(p) = pseudo-blend, e.g.: UNIFEM – (p) United Nations Development Fund for Women
(s) = symbol (none of the above, representing and pronounced as something else; for example: MHz – megahertz)

Some terms are spoken as either acronym or initialism, e.g., VoIP, pronounced both as voyp and V-O-I-P.

(Main list of acronyms)

- U – (s) Uranium
- U&E – Urea and electrolytes, see also Basic metabolic panel

== UA ==
- UA – (s) Ukraine (ISO 3166 digram) (i) Unit of Action
- UAAP – (i) University Athletic Association of the Philippines
- UAB
  - (i) Universitat Autònoma de Barcelona (Spanish for "Autonomous University of Barcelona")
  - (i) University of Alabama at Birmingham (cf. UAB Blazers, the university's athletic program)
  - (i) Upravlyayemaya aviatsionnaya bomba (Russian for "Guided aerial bomb")
- UAE – (i/s) United Arab Emirates (also IOC and FIFA trigram, but not ISO 3166)
- UAH
  - (s) Ukrainian hryvnia (ISO 4217 currency code)
  - (i) University of Alabama in Huntsville
- UAR
  - (i) Uniformly At Random (probability)
  - Unión Argentina de Rugby (Spanish for "Argentine Rugby Union")
  - United Arab Republic
- UAV – (i) Unmanned Aerial Vehicle

== UB ==
- UBA – Unbundled Bitstream Access
- UBC
  - (i) United Baptist Church
  - University of British Columbia
- UBE – (i) Uniform Bar Examination (US)
- UBI – Universal basic income
- UBIGEO – (i) Ubicación Geografica (Spanish for Geographical Location)
- UBS – Union Bank of Switzerland

== UC ==
- UCAV – (a/i) Unmanned Combat Air Vehicle
- UCBSA – (i) United Cricket Board of South Africa
- UCF – (i) University of Central Florida (cf. UCF Knights, this school's athletic program)
- UCI
  - (i) Union Cycliste Internationale (French, "International Cycling Union")
  - University of California, Irvine
- UÇK – (i) initialism for two Albanian guerrilla movements
- UCLA – (i) University of California, Los Angeles (cf. UCLA Bruins, this school's athletic program)
- UCLES – (i) University of Cambridge Local Examinations Syndicate
- UCR
  - (i) University of Costa Rica
  - University of California, Riverside
- UCS – (i) Union of Concerned Scientists
- UCSB – (i) University of California, Santa Barbara
- UCSD – (i) University of California, San Diego

== UD ==
- UDAS – (a) Uppsala-DLR Asteroid Survey
- UDDI – (a) Universal Description, Discovery and Integration
- UDP – (i) User Datagram Protocol
- UDT – (i) Underwater Demolition Team
- UDTS – (i) Uppsala-DLR Trojan Survey

== UE ==
- UE – (i) Unit of Employment
- UEFA – (a) Union of European Football Associations
- UEFI - (i/a) Unified Extensible Firmware Interface
- UESAC – (a) Uppsala-ESO Survey of Asteroids and Comets

== UF ==
- UFC – (i) Ultimate Fighting Championship
- UFO
  - (i) Unidentified flying object
  - United Farmers of Ontario

== UG ==
- ug – (s) Uyghur language (ISO 639-1 code)
- UG – (s) Uganda (ISO 3166 and FIPS 10-4 country code digram)
- UGA – (s) Uganda (ISO 3166 trigram)
- UGV – (i) Unmanned Ground Vehicle
- UGX – (s) ugandan shilling (ISO 4217 currency code)

== UH ==
- UHF – (i) Ultra High Frequency
- UHMW – (i) Ultra-high-molecular-weight polyethylene
- UHRB – (i) Ultra-High Resolution Building (simulation)
- UHSP – (i) University of Health Sciences and Pharmacy (in St. Louis)
- UHNWIs - (i) Ultra High Net Worth Individuals Investopedia and Wikipedia

== UI ==
- UIC – (i) University of Illinois Chicago
- UID – (i) User ID
- uig – (s) Uyghur language (ISO 639-2 code)
- UIL – (i) University Interscholastic League (governing body for most interscholastic activities, notably sports, in Texas public high schools)
- UIUC – (i) University of Illinois Urbana-Champaign
- UIW – (i) University of the Incarnate Word

== UJ ==
- UJTL – (i) Universal Joint Task List
- UJT – Unijunction transistor

== UK ==
- uk – (s) Ukrainian language (ISO 639-1 code)
- UK
  - (i) United Kingdom (also (s) FIPS 10-4 country code)
  - (i) University of Kentucky
- UKDA – (i) United Kingdom Data Archive
- UKIP - (a) UK Independence Party
- ukr – (s) Ukrainian language (ISO 639-2 code)
- UKR – (s) Ukraine (ISO 3166 trigram)

== UL ==
- UL – (i) Underwriters Laboratories
- ULEB – (a) Union des ligues européens de basket-ball, French for "Union of European Basketball Leagues"
- ULF – (i) Ultra Low Frequency
- ULOF – unprotected loss of flow (nuclear accident)
- ULOHS – unprotected loss of heat sink (nuclear accident)
- UTOP – unprotected transient overpower (nuclear accident)

== UM ==
- UM – (s) United States Minor Outlying Islands (postal symbol; ISO 3166 digram)
- UMA – (i) Upper Memory Area
- UMB – (i) University of Maryland, Baltimore
- UMBC – (i) University of Maryland, Baltimore County
- UMC – (i) United Microelectronics Corporation – University of Missouri–Columbia
- UMD – (i) University of Maryland, College Park
- UMCP – (i) University of Maryland, College Park
- UMES – (i) University of Maryland Eastern Shore
- UMGC – (i) University of Maryland, Global Campus
- UMI – (s) United States Minor Outlying Islands (ISO 3166 trigram)
- UMIST – (a) University of Manchester Institute of Science and Technology
- UMK – (i) Uniwersytet Mikołaja Kopernika (Polish "Nicolaus Copernicus University")
- UML – (i) Unified Marxist-Leninist Communist Party of Nepal – Unified Modeling Language – University of Massachusetts Lowell – User-Mode Linux
- UMNO – (a) United Malays National Organisation (Malaysia)
- UMTS – (i) Universal Mobile Telecommunications System

== UN ==
- UN – (i) United Nations
- UNABOM – (p) University and airline bomber (FBI case name)
- UNAIDS – (i/a) Joint United Nations Programme on HIV/AIDS
- UNaM – (p/a) Universidad Nacional de Misiones (Spanish, "National University of Misiones")
- UNAM – (a) Universidad Nacional Autónoma de México (Spanish, "National Autonomous University of Mexico")
- UNAMSIL – (p) United Nations Mission in Sierra Leone
- UNCF – (i) United Negro College Fund
- UNCLOS – (a) United Nations Convention on the Law of the Sea
- UNCSGN – (i) United Nations Conference on the Standardization of Geographical Names
- UNCTAD – (p) United Nations Conference on Trade and Development
- UNDCP – (i) United Nations Drug Control Programme
- UNDE – (i/a) Union of National Defence Employees (Canada)
- UNDP – (i) United Nations Development Programme
- UNEP – (a) United Nations Environment Programme
- UNESCO – (a) United Nations Educational, Scientific and Cultural Organization
- UNFCCC – (i) United Nations Framework Convention on Climate Change
- UNFICYP – (p) United Nations Peacekeeping Force in Cyprus
- UNGEGN – (i) United Nations Group of Experts on Geographical Names
- UNHCR – (i) United Nations High Commissioner for Refugees
- UNICEF – (a) United Nations Children's Fund (originally the United Nations International Children's Emergency Fund)
- UNICRI – (p) United Nations Interregional Crime and Justice Research Institute
- UNIDO – (a) United Nations Industrial Development Organization
- UNIFEM – (p) United Nations Development Fund for Women (from the French Fonds de développement des Nations unies pour la femme)
- UNIS – (p) University of Surrey
- UNLV – (i) University of Nevada, Las Vegas
- UNMIK – (p) United Nations Interim Administration Mission in Kosovo
- UNMOVIC – (p) United Nations Monitoring, Verification and Inspection Commission
- UNOSOM – (p) United Nations Operations in Somalia
- UNPROFOR – (p) United Nations Protection Force (in former Yugoslavia)
- UNRISD – (i) United Nations Research Institute for Social Development
- UNSM – (i) Union of Nova Scotia Municipalities
- UNTAC – (a) United Nations Transitional Authority in Cambodia
- UNTAET – (i/a) United Nations Transitional Administration in East Timor
- UNU – (i) United Nations University

== UP ==
- UP
  - (s) Ukraine (FIPS 10-4 country code)
  - Union Pacific Railroad (AAR reporting mark)
  - (i) Upper Peninsula (of Michigan)
  - Uttar Pradesh
- UPC
  - (i) United Pentecostal Church
  - (i) Universal Product Code
- UPDA – Uganda People's Democratic Army
- UPdM – (i) Università Popolare della Multimedialità
- UPDM – Unified Profile for DoDAF/MODAF
  - Unified Modeling Language Profile for DoDAF and MoDAF
  - Unité de psychiatrie du développement mental
  - Universal Pattern Decomposition Method
  - Unix Power Device Management
  - Unpressurized Docking Mast
  - Urban Planning, Design and Management
- UPF – (i) Universitat Pompeu Fabra (Catalan, "Pompeu Fabra University")
- UPI – (i) United Press International
- UPN – (i) United Paramount Network
- UPS
  - (i) Uninterruptible Power Supply
  - United Parcel Service
- UPT – Universal Personal Telecommunications
- UPTN – Upper Peninsula Telehealth Network
- UPU – (i) Universal Postal Union

== UR ==
- ur – (s) Urdu language (ISO 639-1 code)
- UR – (s) Soviet Union (NATO country code, obsolete 1992)
- URBSFA – (i) Union royale belge des sociétés de football association (French for Royal Belgian Football Association)
- URC
  - (i) Uganda Railways Corporation
  - United Rugby Championship
  - Utility regulatory commission
- urd – (s) Urdu language (ISO 639-2 code)
- URD – (i) User requirements document
- URI
  - (i) Uniform Resource Identifier
  - University of Rhode Island
- URL – (a/i) Uniform Resource Locator ("earl")
- URU – (s) Uruguay (IOC and FIFA trigram, but not ISO 3166)
- URY – (s) Uruguay (ISO 3166 trigram)

== US ==
- US – (i) United States (also (s) ISO 3166 and FIPS 10-4 country code digram)
- USA
  - (i) United States of America (also (s) ISO 3166 trigram)
  - United States Army
- USAF – (i) United States Air Force
- USAFSPC – (i) U.S. Air Force Space Command
- USAACE – (p) United States Army Aviation Center of Excellence, Fort Rucker, Alabama
- USAADAC – (i) United States Army Air Defense Artillery School, Fort Sill, Oklahoma
- USAAS – (p) United States Army Armor School, Ft. Benning, Georgia
- USAIC
  - (i) U.S. Army Infantry Center
  - U.S. Army Intelligence Center
- USAID – (a/i) United States Agency for International Development
- USAP
  - (a) Union Sportive des Arlequins Perpignanais
  - (i) United States Antarctic Program
- USAPATRIOT – (i) Uniting and Strengthening America by Providing Appropriate Tools Required to Intercept and Obstruct Terrorism
- USAREUR – (p) United States Army Europe
- USB – (i) Universal Serial Bus
- USC
  - (i) United States Code
  - University of South Carolina
  - University of Southern California
- USCG – (i) United States Coast Guard
- USCINCSPACE – (p) United States Commander in Chief, Space Command
- USD
  - (s) United States dollar (ISO 4217 currency code)
- USD(A&S) – (i) Under Secretary of Defense for Acquisition and Sustainment
- ASD(R&E) Under Secretary of Defense for Research and Engineering
- USD(C) – (i) (U.S.) Under Secretary of Defense (Comptroller)
- USDA – (i) United States Department of Agriculture
- USDI – (i) United States Department of the Interior
- USDOE – (i) United States Department of Energy
- USD(I) – Under Secretary of Defense for Intelligence
- USDPR – (i) (U.S.) Under Secretary of Defense for Personnel and Readiness
- USDP – (i) (U.S.) Under Secretary of Defense for Policy
- USDRE – (i) (U.S.) Under Secretary of Defense for Research and Engineering
- USEC – (a) United States Enrichment Corporation
- USFL – (i) United States Football League, two different leagues of American football, one operating from 1983–1985 and the second operating in 2022 and 2023
- USFWS – (i) United States Fish and Wildlife Service
- USGS – (i) United States Geological Survey
- USIA – (i) United States Information Agency
- USJFCOM – (p) United States Joint Forces Command
- USL
  - (i) United Soccer League (formerly United Soccer Leagues), a governing body for several lower-level leagues in the United States
  - United Soccer League, the former name of a league operated by the above organization that now plays at the second U.S. level as the USL Championship
  - United Soccer League, a completely different soccer league that operated in 1984 and 1985
  - University of Southwestern Louisiana, a former name for the school now known as the University of Louisiana at Lafayette
- USLC – (i) USL Championship
- USLS – (i) USL Super League (women's soccer league that started play in 2024)
- USLW
  - (i) USL W-League, a women's soccer league operated by the United Soccer League organization from 1995 to 2015
  - USL W League, another women's league operated by the same organization that started play in 2022
- USMC – (i) United States Marine Corps
- USMLE – (i) United States Medical Licensing Examination
- USMNT – (i) United States men's national (soccer) team
- USN – (i) United States Navy
- USNA – (i) United States National Arboretum – United States Naval Academy
- USNB – (i) United States Naval Base
- USNG – (i) United States National Grid
- USNH – (i) United States Naval Hospital
- USNI – (i) United States Naval Institute
- USNO – (i) U.S. Naval Observatory
- USNOFS – (i) United States Naval Observatory Flagstaff Station
- USNP – (i) United States Newspaper Program
- USNR – (i) United States Navy Reserve
- USNS – (i) United States Naval Ship
- USNY – (a) University of the State of New York (usually pronounced "use-knee")
- USNZ – (i) University Sport New Zealand
- USP – (i) Unique Selling Point
- USPS – (i) United States Postal Service
- USPTO – (i) United States Patent and Trademark Office
- USR
  - (a) Universal System Resources (/usr, directory in a *NIX filesystem)
  - (s) User
- USS – (i) United States ship (sometimes meaningless, see Star Trek)
- USSPACECOM – (p) United States Space Command
- USSR – (i) Union of Soviet Socialist Republics
- UST – (i) Underground Storage Tank
- USTRANSCOM – (p) United States Transportation Command
- USWNT – (i) United States women's national (soccer) team

== UT ==
- UT – (i) Universal Time
- UTEP – (a/i) University of Texas at El Paso (pronounced you-tep)
- UTM – (i) Universal Transverse Mercator (geographical co-ordinate system)
- UTRGV – (i) University of Texas Rio Grande Valley
- UTSA – (i) University of Texas at San Antonio

== UU ==
- UU – (i) Unitarian Universalism – University of Utah – Unseen University
- UUA – (i) Unitarian Universalist Association
- UUID – (i) Universally Unique Identifier (see also GUID)
- UUV – (i) Unmanned Underwater Vehicle

== UV ==
- UV – (s) Burkina Faso (FIPS 10-4 country code; from Upper Volta) – (p) ultraviolet
- UVA University of Virginia
- UVM
  - (i) Universal Verification Methodology
  - (i) Universidad del Valle de México
  - (i) University of Vermont, from its Latin name of Universitas Viridis Montis ("University of the Green Mountains")
  - (i) UV mapping

== UW ==
- UW – (i) University of Washington
- UWO – (i) University of Western Ontario
- UWW – (i) United World Wrestling

== UX ==
- UXO – (p) Unexploded ordnance

== UY ==
- UY – (s) Uruguay (ISO 3166 and FIPS 10-4 country code digram)--Up yours
- UYU – (s) Uruguayan peso uruguayo (ISO 4217 currency code)

== UZ ==
- uz – (s) Uzbek language (ISO 639-1 code)
- UZ – (s) Uzbekistan (ISO 3166 and FIPS 10-4 country code digram)
- uzb – (s) Uzbek language (ISO 639-2 code)
- UZB – (s) Uzbekistan (ISO 3166 trigram)
- UZS – (s) Uzbek soum (ISO 4217 currency code)
