= Urte =

Urte is a female first name occurring mainly in Germany.

== Origin and meaning of the name ==
The origin and meaning of Urte is uncertain, but there are at least six theories:

- It comes from Baltic and means handy with a sword
- It is a Basque form of Ruth
- It is from the Danish word for herbs
- It is a modification of Urd
- It is a Baltic short form of Dorothea
- It is a short form of Ortrud

== Given names ==
- Urte Blankenstein (Actress; see de:Urte Blankenstein and http://imdb.com/name/nm1779155/)
- Urte Juodvalkyte (Lithuanian road cyclist)
- Urte Kazakeviciute (Lithuania swimmer)
- Urte Pautz (Author and academic; see https://www.amazon.ca/s?ie=UTF8&search-type=ss&index=books-ca&field-author=Urte%20Pautz&page=1)
- Urte Sejûnaite (Actress; see https://www.imdb.com/name/nm1991570/)

== Other instances ==
Urte is also a common noun in Basque meaning "year":

- Urte ilunak (Movie; see https://www.imdb.com/title/tt0105705/)
- 25 Kantu Urte (Album of songs recorded in 1996 by the Basque group Oskorri; see https://www.rambles.net/oskorri_25kantu96.html)

== See also ==
- https://www.baby-vornamen.de/Maedchen/U/Ur/Urte/
