= U of Z =

U of Z may refer to:

- University of Zagreb, a university in Croatia
- University of Zaragoza, alternatively known as Universidad de Zaragoza or Saragossa University, a university in Spain
- University of Zawia, a university in Libya
- University of Zimbabwe, a university in Zimbabwe

== See also ==
- Uz (disambiguation)
