= U of K =

U of K may refer to:

- University of Khartoum
- University of Kansas
- University of Kentucky

== See also ==
- UK (disambiguation)
