= Samsung YP-R1 =

Portable media player

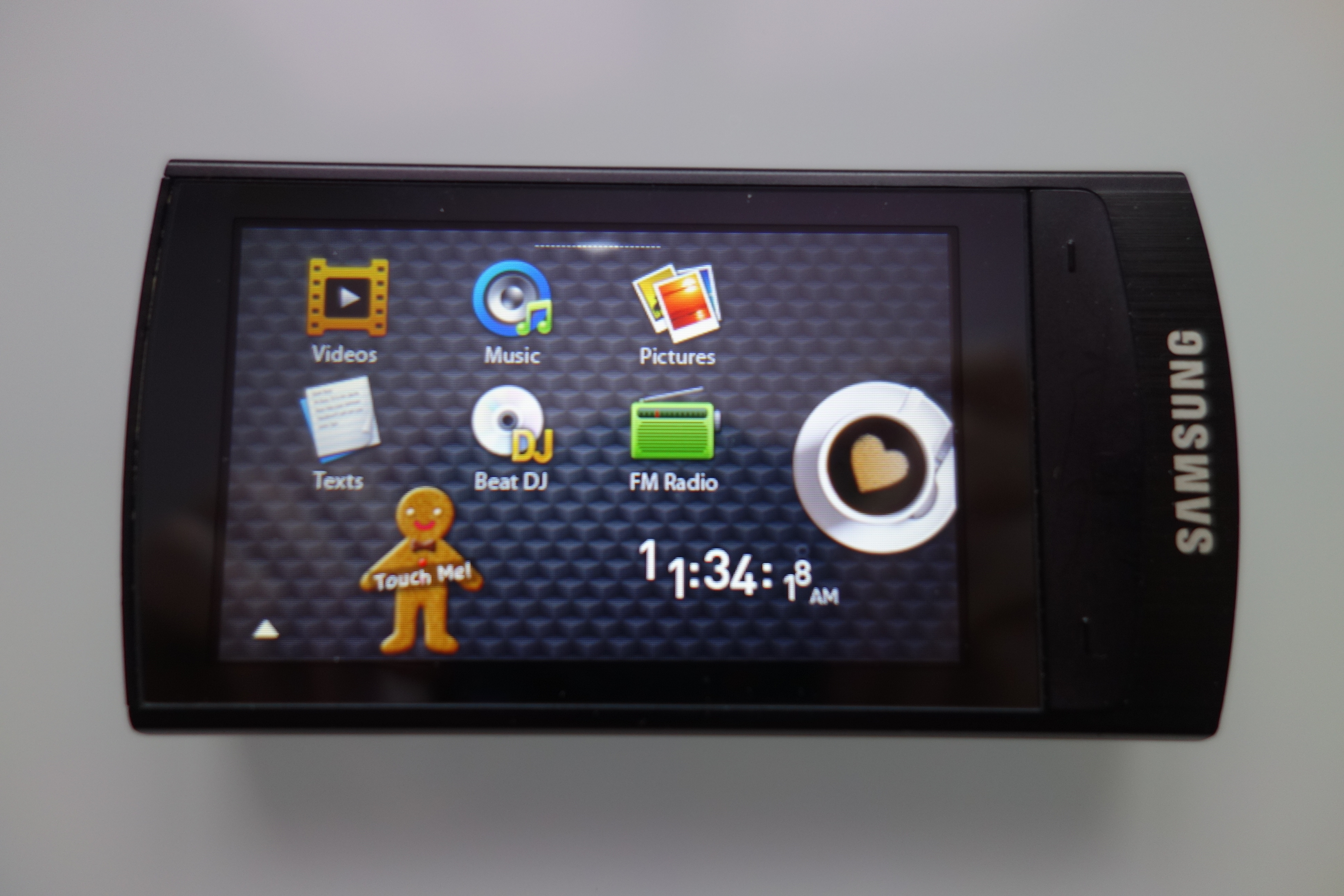
- Manufacturer: Samsung Electronics
- Type: Portable Media Player
- Series: Samsung YEPP
- First released: September 2009
- Discontinued: 2011
- Related: YP-R0, YP-R2
- Dimensions: 85.2 mm (3.35 in) H 45.5 mm (1.79 in) W 8.9 mm (0.35 in) D
- Weight: 50 g (1.8 oz)
- Operating system: Proprietary firmware (latest v3.07) / Rockbox
- System-on-chip: Freescale IMX.37
- CPU: 532MHz ARM1176JZF
- Memory: 64 MB RAM
- Storage: 4, 8, 16, 32 GB
- Battery: Li-Polymer 500mAh
- Display: 2.6 inch 240x400 pixel TFT LCD
- Sound: Wolfson WM1808
- Connectivity: USB 2.0 (Proprietary connector)
- Data inputs: Capacitive Touchscreen

The Samsung YP-R1 (also known as Samsung R1 worldwide or Yepp R1 in Korea or Samsung R'MIX in France because of its DJ feature) is a portable media player made by Samsung, first leaked on the webshop play.com on June 14, 2009 and then released at the end of September 2009. It was developed along with the YP-R0 with which it shares several specifications (similar aluminum design, same Linux kernel and SoC). The R1 is available in four different Flash memory capacities: 4 GB, 8 GB, 16 GB and 32 GB. It comes in three different colors: black, silver and pink. It features an aluminum case, a 2.6 inch TFT LCD capacitive touchscreen with a resolution of 240 by 400 pixels, a RDS FM tuner, Bluetooth (v2.0 + EDR) and a proprietary USB connector. Several EQ and sound effects are available through Samsung's DNSe 3.0 sound engine.

== Media support ==
- Audio codecs: MP3, WMA, WAV, OGG Vorbis, AAC-LC/Plus, RA and FLAC.
- Video codecs: DivX, Xvid, MPEG-4, H.264, WMV9 in AVI/SVI/MP4/WMV/ASF/MOV containers. Video files up to resolution 720x480 are natively supported so in most cases converting is not necessary.
- Picture formats: JPG, BMP, PNG, GIF
- Other: TXT and SWF files

== Operation ==
The Samsung R1 is compatible with Microsoft Windows, Linux and Mac OS X when USB mode is set to MSC as a drag and drop USB mass storage device. The player can also function as a Windows Media 10 and up device when USB mode is set to MTP. The R1 is the last Samsung MP3 player to have this proprietary USB connector (first introduced end of 2006 on the YP-K5). Newer devices have a standard microUSB connector. Besides the touchscreen, it also has 3 physical keys (power/hold, volume up, volume down). The R1 only powers fully off after several hours not being used or when pressing the reset hole. The rest of the time it only switches to a sleep mode. Samsung claims up to 25 hours of music playback (with MP3 128 kbit/s files, volume level 15, normal sound mode and display off) and 5 hours of video playback (SVI, brightness 3, volume level 15, normal sound mode).

The R1 features an icon and widget based TouchWiz user interface developed in landscape mode. However it is possible to rotate the "Now Playing" screen to portrait mode.

== Special features ==
=== Bluetooth ===
The YP-R1 has a Bluetooth 2.0 + EDR chip which supports several profiles including A2DP, AVRCP, HFP, Object Push etc... As a result, it is possible to receive and emit phone calls on the R1 over Bluetooth, to send and receive files or to listen to music with a stereo Bluetooth headset.

=== Beat DJ ===
Marketed as a major feature, especially in France where the commercial name R'MIX comes from, the DJ feature was often viewed as superfluous by the reviewers and users. This feature allows the user to scratch and apply several DJ filters and pre-recorded samples on a music track. The final result cannot be saved though. This feature was first introduced on the Samsung Platine/Beat DJ mobile phone a few months ago.

=== Other features ===
The R1 has four embedded games (Bubble Bang, Sudoku Champ, AstroRanger and WiseStar) and also supports SWF flash games and applications. It also has a voice recorder and a TV line-out using a 3.5mm to RCA cable.

== Software ==
No additional CD is shipped with the R1 but the optional software EmoDio can be found in the device's internal memory or can be downloaded from the official Samsung website. EmoDio (discontinued, now replaced by Kies) is able to sync one's library with the R1, convert video files, manage playlists, rip CDs etc..

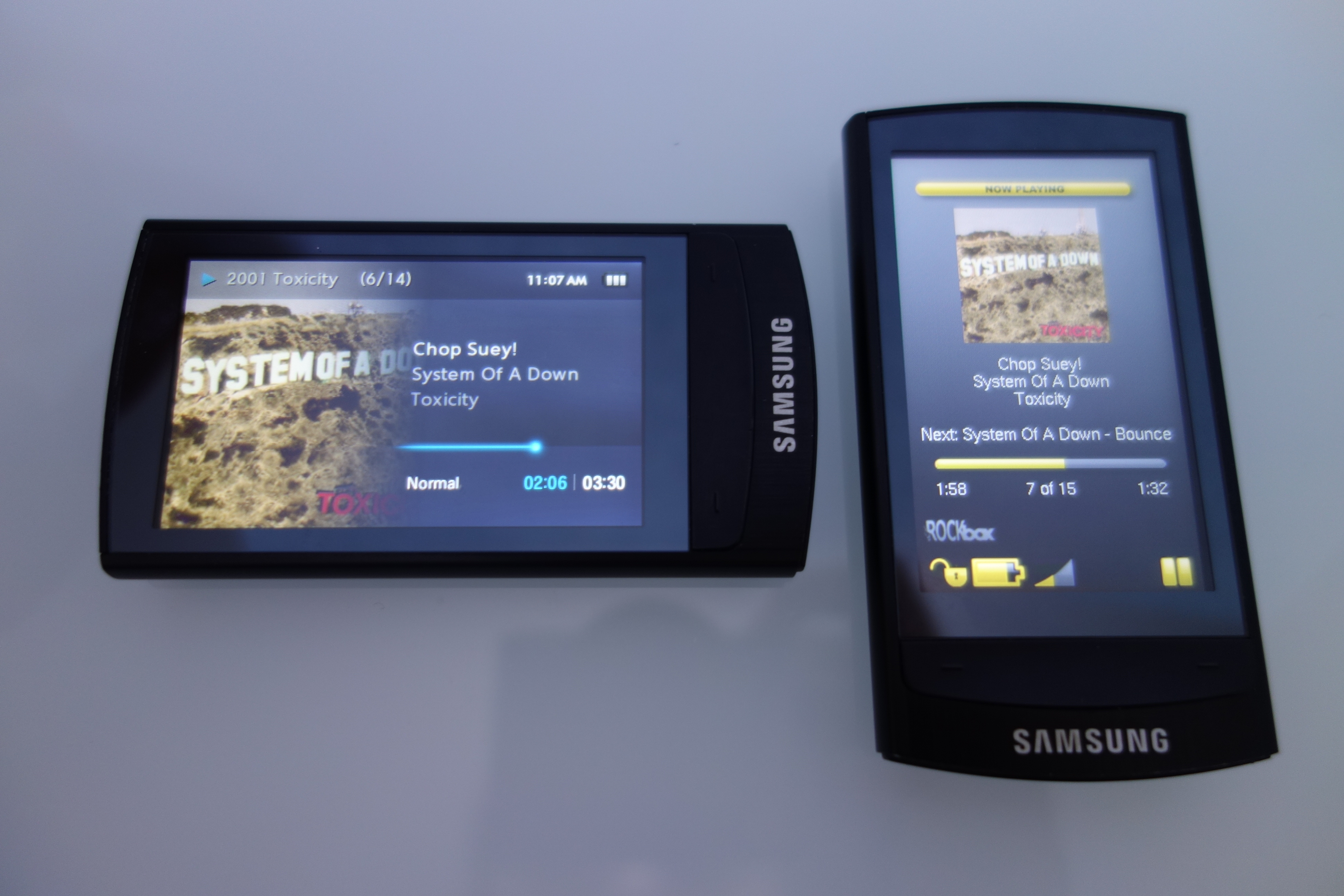
On the left: Samsung firmware's "Now Playing Screen". On the right: Rockbox's "While Playing Screen" with default theme cabbiev2

=== Samsung original firmware ===
Samsung released 9 firmware versions, from v1.09 to the latest one, v3.07, released on October 26, 2010. Most of them are only bug fixes releases but Samsung also released two major updates adding or improving features. The first one is v2.00 released on November 24, 2009. which made the overall UI, the coverflow and pictures scroll smoother. It also added two flash games. Then the v3.00 released on December 27, 2009, added the premium fonts and UCI support (in Korea only, the user needs a Korean ID and banking account to pay and download) and SDK 3.0 UCI support (User Created Interface: main menu customization for which the new SDK 3.0 gives more possibilities). It also made the coverflow and videos scroll still smoother. But the most awaited improvement was the playing time with DNSe sound effects enabled. Indeed, while the audio battery life with DNSe disabled is more than 20 hours, with DNSe enabled it was only about 8 hours. With firmware v3.00 this was improved to 12.5 hours.

Like the YP-R0, the R1 is infamous for its many bugs, especially the library update one: when adding new files into the player's internal memory, it automatically updates the media library after disconnecting the device from the computer. It sometimes occurs that due to some specific audio files, the updating process hangs up, leading to brick the device. It is then no longer recognized by the computer and can no longer start up. Samsung released several firmware updates to fix this bug but never managed to find all root causes. As a result, the issue may occur even with the latest firmware v3.07. A preventive solution is to install a modded firmware or Rockbox (see below). Otherwise the user has to send his device back to the after-sales service center or use the leaked recovery tool.

Unlike the older Samsung players which had a specific firmware for every region, on R1 the region code can be changed independently from the firmware (meaning that the firmware is the same worldwide). Each region code (KR, EU, FR, RU, US etc...) has it owns specificities like RDS support, lyrics support, MSC only or MSC/MTP setting etc...

=== Alternative firmware ===
Following the success of YP-R0 modded firmware, the Italian developer also worked on a modded firmware for YP-R1. This modded v4.00 based on the official v3.07 was released on September 15, 2011. Compared to the official firmware v3.07 it adds a "Safe Mode" (the device can be connected to the computer even when bricked), a DRK (Device Rescue Kit) to unbrick the device, a CPU downclocking tool to save battery life and the possibility to customize the firmware's resources (pictures, sounds, fonts, language).

Since early 2013 the alternative free and open-source firmware Rockbox can be installed on the YP-R1. Unlike most usual Rockbox targets, the YP-R1 port is not a native port. It runs as an application based on the original Linux kernel used by Samsung in the official firmware. That makes the development easier but on the downside, Rockbox boots up slower as on the other usual targets. As of December 2013, the YP-R1 port is available as a separate patch and has not been merged into the Rockbox source code yet. The user has to compile the Rockbox bootloader himself or to use a pre-built, dualboot-modded firmware including the Rockbox bootloader. Compared to the Samsung original firmware, Rockbox supports more audio codecs and gapless playback among other things.

== See also ==
- Samsung YEPP
- Samsung Galaxy Player
- Samsung Electronics
