= Urú =

Urú may refer to:

- Urú, the Spanish name for the spot-winged wood quail
- Urú or eclipsis, a type of initial consonant mutation in the Irish language

== See also ==
- Uru (disambiguation)
- Urús, a village in Girona, Catalonia, Spain
