= UAS =

UAS or Uas may refer to:

== People ==
- Ustad Abdul Somad

== Education ==
- Undergraduate Ambassadors Scheme, UK
- University of Agricultural Sciences (disambiguation)
- University of Alaska Southeast
- University of Alabama System
- University of Applied Sciences
- University of applied sciences (Finland)
- University of Agricultural Sciences, Dharwad
- Universidad Autónoma de Sinaloa, or Autonomous University of Sinaloa
- Uruguayan American School
- Acronym for University of Applied Sciences

== Science and technology ==
- Unidentified aerial system, a military term for an unidentified flying object used for unknown aircraft.
- Unmanned aircraft system, which includes a UAV (or drone) and a ground control station
- Upstream activating sequence, a genetic sequence
- USB Attached SCSI, a protocol for transferring data between storage devices
- User Agent Server, part of the Session Initiation Protocol
- User agent String, text sent over HTTP to identify a web client
- Unity Asset Server, a tool for the Unity game engine

== Other uses ==
- uas, an alternative spelling for the ancient Egyptian was-sceptre
- University Air Squadron
- United Arab States, a former union between the United Arab Republic (Egypt and Syria) and North Yemen
- Universal Animation Studios, an American animation studio and part of Universal Pictures

== See also ==
- UAR (disambiguation)
