= SS United =

SS United may refer to:

- SS United States
- SS United Group Oil & Gas Company

== See also ==
- USS (disambiguation)
