= Personal mobility =

In Universal Personal Telecommunications (UPT), personal mobility is the ability of a user to access telecommunication services at any UPT terminal on the basis of a personal identifier, and the capability of the network to provide those services in accord with the user's service profile.

Personal mobility involves the network's capability to locate the terminal associated with the user for the purposes of addressing, routing, and charging the user for calls. "Access" is intended to convey the concepts of both originating and terminating services. Management of the service profile by the user is not part of personal mobility. The personal mobility aspects of personal communications are based on the UPT number.
