= UTM =

UTM may refer to:

== Computing ==
- Unified threat management, an approach to network security
- Universal Turing machine, a theoretical computer
- Urchin Tracking Module parameters, used in Urchin, a Web analytics package that served as the base for Google Analytics and other analytics
- Usability testing method, in interaction design
- Unbounded transactional memory, transactional memory without bounds on transaction size or time
- Universeller Transaktionsmonitor, transaction system for Fujitsu-Siemens BS2000/OSD mainframe
- UTM (software), virtual machine software

== Education ==
- University of Toronto Mississauga, one of the three University of Toronto campuses, Canada
  - UTM Eagles, intramural sports teams of the University of Toronto Mississauga
  - University of Toronto Mississauga bus terminal (UTM), a bus terminal for MiWay in Missisauga
- Technical University of Moldova, Moldova
- Universiti Teknologi Malaysia, also known as University of Technology, Malaysia
- University of Technology, Mauritius, Mauritius
- University of Tennessee at Martin, United States
- University of Toulouse II – Le Mirail, France
- Universidad Tecnológica de la Mixteca, the Spanish name of Mexican public university Technological University of the Mixteca
- Technical University of Manabi, higher technical level university located in the city of Portoviejo, province of Manabí, Ecuador.

== Other ==
- Ultrasonic thickness measurement, using ultrasound waves to determine thickness of metals
- Undergraduate Texts in Mathematics, a series of books published by Springer-Verlag
- Universal testing machine, a machine used to test the tensile and compressive stresses in materials
- Universal Transverse Mercator coordinate system, a grid-based method of mapping locations on the surface of the Earth
- Unmanned aircraft system traffic management, a system for cooperative control of unmanned aerial vehicles
- Union des travailleurs de Mauritanie (Union of Mauritanian Workers), a national trade union center in Mauritania
- Uniunea Tineretului Muncitoresc (Union of Communist Youth), Romania's former communist youth party organisation
