= Uva =

UVA most often refers to:

- Ultraviolet A, a wavelength of light
- University of Virginia, Charlottesville, Virginia, United States

Uva, UVA and UvA may also refer to:

== Arts and media ==
- Uva, a fictional academy in the Pokémon Scarlet and Violet video games
- United Visual Artists, a British art and design group
- Until Victory Always: A Memoir, by Gaelic footballer Jim McGuinness

== Economics ==
- Unidad Valor Adquisitivo, an Argentinian financial instrument

== Education ==
- University of Virginia, United States
- University of Amsterdam, Netherlands (Dutch: Universiteit van Amsterdam, UvA)
- University of Vaasa, Finland
- University of Valladolid, Spain
- State University of Vale do Acaraú, Ceará, Brazil
- Veiga de Almeida University, Rio de Janeiro, Brazil (Portuguese: Universidade Veiga de Almeida)
- Uva College, Badulla, a school in Sri Lanka

== Places ==
- Uva, Missouri, United States
- Uva, Wyoming, United States
- Uva Province, Sri Lanka
- Uva, Russia
- Uva, Vimioso, Portugal
- Uva, Ristijärvi, Finland
- Garner Field (IATA:UVA), an airfield in Texas, United States

== Science ==
- Uvea (anatomy), a layer of the eye
- Ultraviolet A, a wavelength of light

== People with the surname Uva ==
- Francisco Uva (born 1904), Portuguese fencer
- Three Portuguese rugby player brothers:
  - Gonçalo Uva (born 1984)
  - João Uva (born 1980)
  - Vasco Uva (born 1982)
- Thomas and Rosemarie Uva, New York double murder victims
