= UCS =

UCS may refer to:

== Educational institutions ==
- University College School, a British independent school situated in Hampstead, north west London
- University Campus Suffolk, former name of a university based in Ipswich, Suffolk, United Kingdom
- University of Caxias do Sul, a university in Brazil

== Technology ==
- Cisco Unified Computing System, a computing server product line
- Uniform Communication Standard, an electronic commerce standard
- Uniform-cost search, an algorithm used to search a weighted graph
- Univention Corporate Server, an operating and management system for IT infrastructure
- Universal Character Set, a standard for character encoding
- Universal Character Set feature for impact printers
- Universal Charging Solution, a proposed standard for cell phone chargers
- Uniform color space, a type of mathematical color model

== Other ==
- Civic Solidarity Union, a political party in Bolivia
- Undercover Slut, a French-American musical group
- Uniform Color Scales, a color space developed by the Optical Society of America
- Union of Concerned Scientists, a nonprofit advocacy organisation
- United Cigar Stores, an American tobacconist chain of the early 20th century
- United Communication Service, the largest cable operator in Bangladesh
- Universal City Studios, an American film studio, and a subsidiary of Comcast and NBCUniversal
- Upper Clyde Shipbuilders, a now defunct amalgamation of shipbuilders of the River Clyde, Glasgow, Scotland
- Judiciary of New York or Unified Court System, of the State of New York
- Ultimate Collectors Series, a section of the Lego Star Wars range
