= UCF (disambiguation) =

UCF most commonly stands for the University of Central Florida, a metropolitan public research university located near Orlando, Florida, United States.

It may also refer to:

- University College Freiburg, a liberal arts education institution at the University of Freiburg.
- ucf (Update Configuration File), a Unix utility for preserving user changes to configuration files
- UCF Knights, the athletic program of the University of Central Florida
- Ulster Cycling Federation, a member of Cycling Ireland
- Uniform Contract Format, a standardized contract structure for Government procurement in the United States
- United Citizen Federation, a fictional world government of Earth in the 1997 film Starship Troopers
- United Civil Front, a social movement in Russia founded and led by chess grandmaster Garry Kasparov
- Universal conductance fluctuations, a phenomenon encountered in quantum physics in electrical transport experiments in mesoscopic species
- Universal Communication Format, a communication protocol developed by the IEEE for multimedia communication
