= UCK =

UCK or Uck may refer to:

- Ubuntu Customization Kit, for a live CD of the Ubuntu operating system
- Uckfield railway station, East Sussex, England
- Kosovo Liberation Army (KLA; Albanian: Ushtria Çlirimtare e Kosovës, UÇK)
- National Liberation Army (NLA; Albanian: Ushtria Çlirimtare Kombëtare, UÇK)
- River Uck, East Sussex, England

== See also ==
- UÇK (disambiguation)
