= UCI =

UCI most commonly refers to:

- University of California, Irvine, a public university in Irvine, California, United States
- Union Cycliste Internationale, the world governing body for the sport of cycling

UCI may also refer to:

- Uganda Cancer Institute, a cancer treatment and research institution in Kampala, Uganda
- Unified Configuration Interface, a set of scripts to unify and simplify the configuration the OpenWrt operating system
- Union Correctional Institution, Florida, United States
- Unione Cinematografica Italiana, an Italian film company of the silent era
- Unit Compliance Inspection, a United States Air Force inspection
- UCI Cinemas (United Cinemas International), cinema company in Brazil, Germany, Italy and Portugal
- Universal Chess Interface, a communications protocol for chess game software
- Univision Communications Inc., the former name of the American subsidiary of media company TelevisaUnivision
- Unlawful command influence, a term in American military law
- Universal Content Identifier, South Korean content identification system
- Koço Uçi (1923–1982), Albanian composer
