= Samsung YP-R0 =

Digital audio player

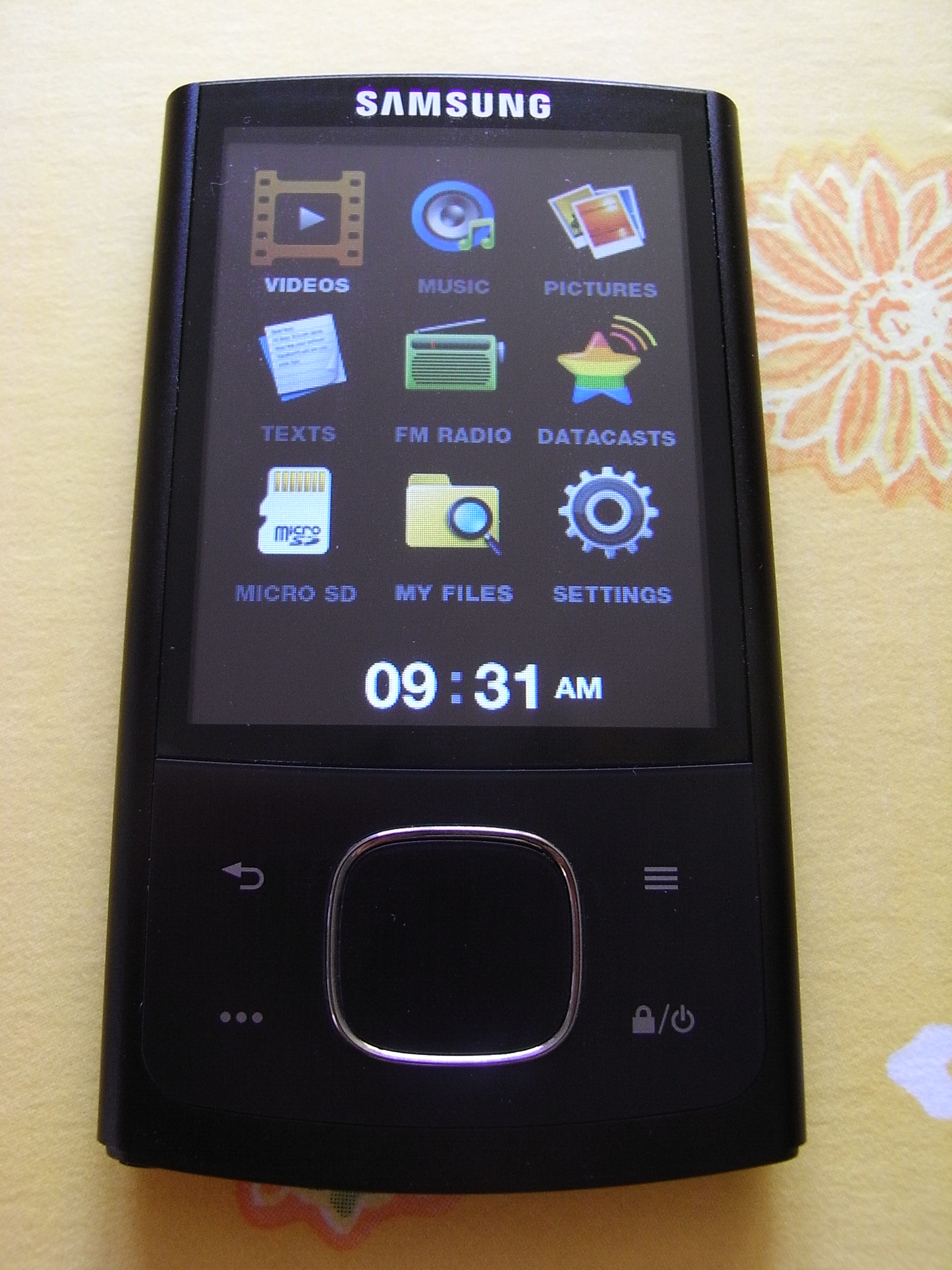
- Manufacturer: Samsung Electronics
- Type: Portable Media Player
- Series: Samsung YEPP
- First released: October 2009
- Discontinued: 2011
- Related: YP-Q3, YP-R1
- Dimensions: 93 mm (3.7 in) H 52 mm (2.0 in) W 8.8 mm (0.35 in) D
- Weight: 60 g (2.1 oz)
- Operating system: Proprietary firmware (latest v1.25) / Rockbox
- System-on-chip: Freescale IMX.37
- CPU: 532MHz ARM1176JZF
- Memory: 64 MB RAM
- Storage: 4, 8, 16 GB
- Removable storage: microSDHC up to 32 GB
- Battery: Li-Polymer 600mAh made by Amperex Technology Limited
- Display: 2.6 inch 240x320 pixel TFT LCD
- Sound: AMS AS3543
- Connectivity: USB 2.0 (Micro B)
- Data inputs: Tactile buttons

The Samsung YP-R0 (also known as Samsung R0 worldwide or Yepp R0 in Korea or Samsung R'PLAY in France) is a portable media player made by Samsung, leaked on August 10, 2009 and first released end of October 2009 in Russia. It was developed along with the YP-R1 with which it shares several specifications (similar aluminum design, same Linux kernel and SoC). The R0 is available in three different Flash memory capacities: 4 GB, 8 GB, and 16 GB. It comes in three different colors: black, silver and pink. Storage is expandable via a microSDHC slot with capacity up to 32 GB, and unofficially to 64 GB or more via FAT32 formatted SDXC cards. It features an aluminum case, a 2.6 inch TFT LCD with a resolution of 240 by 320 pixels, RDS FM tuner, tactile buttons and microUSB connector. Several EQ and sound effects are available through Samsung's DNSe 3.0 sound engine.

== Media support ==
- Audio codecs: MP3, WMA, WAV, OGG Vorbis, AAC-LC/Plus and FLAC.
- Video codecs: DivX, Xvid, MPEG-4, H.264, WMV9 in AVI/SVI/MP4/WMV/ASF/MOV containers. Video files up to resolution 720x480 are natively supported so in most cases converting is not necessary.
- Picture formats: JPG, BMP, PNG, GIF
- Other: TXT files

== Operation ==
The Samsung R0 is compatible with Microsoft Windows, Linux and Mac OS X when USB mode is set to MSC as a drag and drop USB mass storage device. The player can also function as a Windows Media 10 and up device when USB mode is set to MTP. Unlike many Samsung players, the R0 features a standard microUSB connector. It also has 9 physical keys (power/hold, back, menu, user button, select, up, down, left, right) but neither hardware hold key nor dedicated volume buttons. The R0 only powers fully off after several hours not being used or when pressing the reset hole. The rest of the time it only switches to a sleep mode. Samsung claims up to 30 hours of music playback (with MP3 128 kbit/s files, volume level 15, normal sound mode and display off) and 6 hours of video playback (SVI, brightness 3, volume level 15, normal sound mode).

== Software ==
No additional CD is shipped with the R0 but the optional software EmoDio can be found in the device's internal memory or can be downloaded from the official Samsung website. EmoDio (discontinued, now replaced by Kies) is able to sync one's library with the R0, convert video files, manage playlists, rip CDs etc..

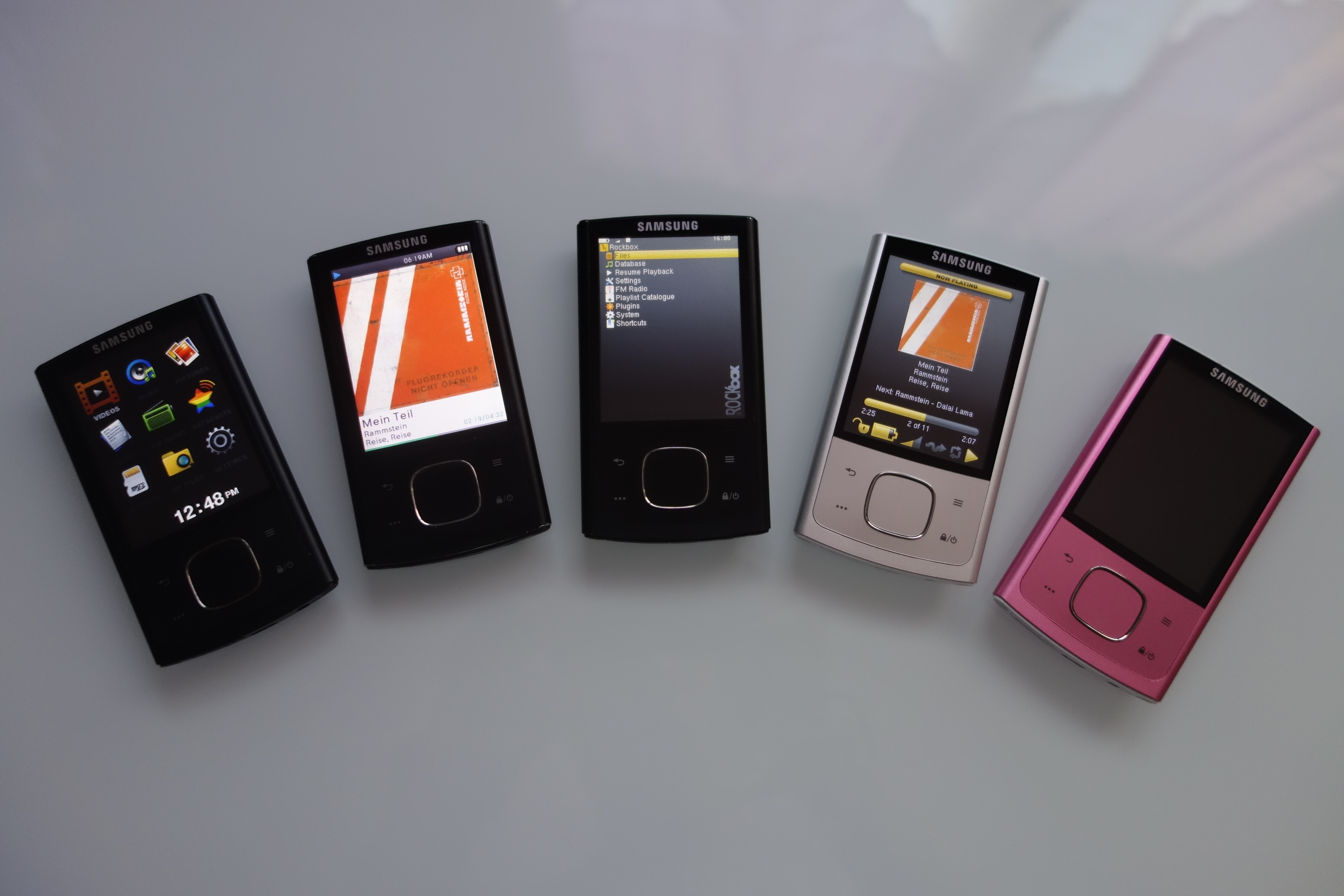
A collection of YP-R0 running the original firmware and Rockbox

=== Samsung original firmware ===
Samsung released 10 firmware revisions, from v1.03 to the latest one, v1.25, released on May 11, 2011. The firmware was only released to fix bugs but not to add or improve features. Indeed, only the UCI (User Created Interface: main menu customization) and premium fonts (in Korea only) support have been added via a new firmware. The YP-R0 is infamous for its many bugs, especially one involving its library update process: when adding new files into the internal memory of the player, it automatically updates the media library after disconnecting the device from the computer. It sometimes occurs that due to some specific audio files, the updating process hangs up, leading to brick the R0. It is then no longer recognized by the computer and can no longer start up. Samsung released several firmware updates to fix this bug but never managed to find all root causes. As a result, the issue may occur even with the latest firmware v1.25. A preventive solution is to install a modded firmware or Rockbox (see below). Otherwise the user has to send his device back to the after-sales service center or use the leaked recovery tool.

Unlike the older Samsung players which had a specific firmware for every region, on R0 the region code can be changed independently from the firmware (meaning that the firmware is the same worldwide). Each region code (KR, EU, FR, RU, US etc...) has it owns specificities like RDS support, lyrics support, MSC only or MSC/MTP setting etc...

=== Alternative firmware ===
On July 7, 2011, the first modded firmware v2.00 based on the official firmware v1.25 was released by an Italian developer. Modded firmware releases v2.10 and v2.20 came out later. Compared to the official firmware v1.25, they add a "Safe Mode" (the device can be connected to the computer even when bricked), a DRK (Device Rescue Kit) to unbrick the device, a CPU downclocking tool to save battery life and the possibility to customize the resources (pictures, sounds, fonts, language) of the firmware.

Since 2011 the alternative free and open-source firmware Rockbox can be installed on the YP-R0. Unlike most usual Rockbox targets, the YP-R0 port is not a native port. It runs as an application based on the original Linux kernel used by Samsung in the official firmware. That makes the development easier but on the downside, Rockbox boots up slower as on the other usual targets. As of December 2013, the YP-R0 is an unstable port according to the official Rockbox classification. In fact, it runs well enough for a daily use but cannot be installed via Rockbox Utility yet. The user has to compile the Rockbox bootloader themselves or to use a pre-built modded firmware including the Rockbox bootloader such as modded firmware v2.51 (dualboot) or lightROM 4.6 (Rockbox only). Contrary to the Samsung firmware, Rockbox merges the internal memory and the microSD card into the same tags library, supports more audio codecs and gapless playback among other things.

== See also ==
- Samsung YEPP
- Samsung Galaxy Player
- Samsung Electronics
