= U of A =

U of A may refer to

- Unit of account, a unit of measure

== Universities ==
=== Oceania ===
- University of Adelaide, in Australia
- University of Auckland, in New Zealand

=== Europe ===
- University of Antwerp, in Belgium
- Aveiro University, in Portugal
- University of Aberdeen, in Scotland
- University of Alcalá, in Spain

=== North America ===
- University of Alberta, in Canada
- University of Akron, in the United States
- University of Alabama, in the United States
- University of Alaska System, in the United States
- University at Albany, The State University of New York, in the United States
- University of Arizona, in the United States
- University of Arkansas, in the United States
- University of Atlanta, in the United States

== See also ==
- List of art schools as "University of the Arts" is an often used name for an arts-oriented institution of higher learning
- UA (disambiguation)
