= USAP =

USAP, Usap, or usap may refer to:

== Education ==
- United States Academic Pentathlon
- United States Student Achievers Program
- University of San Pedro Sula, Honduras
- United States Antarctic Program

== Sports ==
- USA Perpignan, a rugby union club in Perpignan, France
- USA Pickleball, the national governing body for pickleball in the United States.

== Other ==
- Unacknowledged Special Access Program
- United States Antarctic Program
- Universal Security Audit Programme
