= UZB =

UZB or uzb may be:

- an abbreviation for Uzbekistan, a country in Central Asia
- the ICAO code for Uzbekistan Airways, the national airline of Uzbekistan
- the ISO 639 code for the Uzbek language
