= UFC (disambiguation) =

UFC is the Ultimate Fighting Championship, an American mixed martial arts promotion company.

UFC may also refer to:

== Organizations ==
=== Academic organizations ===
- Federal University of Ceará (Universidade Federal do Ceará), Ceará, Brazil
- Universities Funding Council, a defunct British funding body
- University of Franche-Comté (Université de Franche-Comté), Besançon, France

=== Businesses ===
- UFC Group, a Mongolian food and beverage company
- United Fruit Company, an American corporation that traded in bananas and other tropical fruit
- Universal Foods Corporation (Philippines) or UFC Philippines, a Philippine food processing company which became a subsidiary of NutriAsia

=== Other organizations ===
- Union of Forces for Change (Union des Forces du Changement), a Togolese political party
- United Faculty of Central, an American trade union representing faculty members at Central Washington University in Ellensburg
- United Farmers of Canada (1926–1949), a radical farmers organization
- United Free Church of Scotland, a Scottish Presbyterian denomination
- Uniting for Consensus (UfC), a multinational opposition to permanent seats at the UN Security Council
- UFC-Que Choisir, a French consumers group

== Science ==
- Urea-formaldehyde concentrate, a thermosetting polymer produced by a Russian chemical company TogliattiAzot
- Urinary free cortisol, in medical testing

== Video games ==
- Ultimate Fighting Championship (video game), 2000
- EA Sports UFC, 2014

== Other uses ==
- UFC (food brand), a brand of banana ketchup
- Ulster F.C., an Irish association football club (1877–1930s)
