= Unu (disambiguation) =

unu was a Romanian art magazine published from 1928 to 1935.

UNU or Unu may also refer to:

- United Nations University, the academic and research arm of the United Nations, established in 1973 and based in Tokyo, Japan
- University of Nottingham Students' Union, formerly called University of Nottingham Union
- Unnilunium (Unu), the IUPAC systematic name for chemical element 101, Mendelevium (symbol: Md)
- Unu River, Romania
- Unu (Star Wars), a fictional race in the Star Wars universe
- Utah Nrrd Utilities, a command-line utility for managing files in the .nrrd format
- UNU, a human swarm intelligence platform provided by Unanimous A.I.
- Unu (company), a German manufacturer of electric scooters based in Berlin

== See also ==
- U Nu (1907–1995), first Prime Minister of Burma
