= Union of National Defence Employees =

Canadian trade union

The Union of National Defence Employees is a component of the Public Service Alliance of Canada.

They represent more than 19,000 civilian employees working in support of the Department of National Defence. This number includes members at the Communications Security Establishment, a number of employees of the Staff of the Personnel Support Programs and a growing number of private sector employers including Serco, Aramark, IMP, ATCO-Frontec.

== History ==
The UNDE was created in 1966 when civil servants were given the right to collective bargain. The representatives of civil servants at the time the Civil Service Federation and the Civil Service Association of Canada decided to merge their membership in their departments. So the National Defence Employees Association and the members belonging to the Civil Service Association of Canada working in National Defence merged to form the UNDE. The Civil Service Federation and Civil Service Association of Canada then merged to form the Public Service Alliance of Canada.

== Executive ==
President

- June Winger

Executive Vice-President

- Paul Jones

== See also ==
- Official website
- Professional Institute of the Public Service of Canada
- International Brotherhood of Electrical Workers
