= Umi =

Umi or UMI may refer to:

== Geography ==
- Umi, Iran, a village in Razavi Khorasan Province, Iran
- Umi, Fukuoka, a town in Japan

== People ==
- Umi-a-Liloa, king of the island of Hawaii
- Umi Dachlan, Indonesian female artist
- Umi Garrett, American female pianist.
- Umi (singer), Tierra Umi Wilson (born 1999), American singer and songwriter
- "Umi" (song), ("海", literally 'ocean') Japanese language song by Japanese band Lead, 2007
- Umi Tenjin, Japanese voice actress

=== Fictional characters ===
- Umi Ryuzaki, a character in the fictional manga series Magic Knight Rayearth
- Umi Sonoda, a character in Love Live! School Idol Project
- Umi Kōsaka, a character in The Idolmaster Million Live!
- Umi Nagino, a character in the anime series Little Battlers Experience WARS
- Umi Katō, a character in the visual novel series Summer Pockets

== Acronyms ==
- Unified Media Interface, a computer interconnect used in AMD APU systems
- Italian Mathematical Union (Italian: Unione Matematica Italiana), an Italian mathematics society
- Uganda Management Institute, a business education institute in Kampala, Uganda
- Union Mundial pro Interlingua, an organization related to the international language Interlingua
- Methodist University of Indonesia (Universitas Methodist Indonesia), a university in Medan, Indonesia
- University Microfilms International, a microfilm publisher
- Urban Ministries, Inc., an American Christian media company
- Ursa Minor (UMi), a constellation
- Unique molecular identifier, a technique used in molecular biology research
- United States Minor Outlying Islands, ISO_3166 Alpha-3 code of United States Minor Outlying Islands consisting of eight United States insular areas in the Pacific Ocean

== Arts ==
- Umi, a sculpture by Daniel Popper

== Companies ==
- Former name of Umidigi, a Chinese mobile phone manufacturer
