= UCR =

UCR may refer to:

- Unclassified county road, an obsolete term for a green lane (road) in England and Wales
- Under color removal in printing
- Unified Cornish Revised, a variety of the Cornish language
- Uniform Crime Reports
- Union centriste et républicaine (Centrist and Republican Union), group of the French senate
- Unión Cívica Radical (Radical Civic Union), an Argentine political party
- Unión Cordobesa de Rugby, body that rules the game of rugby union in Córdoba, Argentina
  - Torneo de Córdoba, a rugby union club competition organised by UCR
- University Center Rochester in Minnesota
- University of California, Riverside
- University of Costa Rica
- University College Roosevelt, Middelburg, The Netherlands
- Upper Chattahoochee Riverkeeper, an environmental advocacy organization in Georgia, USA
- Urea-creatinine ratio
- Usual, customary and reasonable, a method of generating health care prices
