= USP =

USP may refer to:

== Government institutions ==
- Unité Spéciale de la Police, Luxembourg
- United States Penitentiary, a prison
- Utah State Prison, Draper, US

== Math and science ==
- Ultra-short period planets, orbiting planets with periods shorter than one day
- Ultraspiracle protein, a part of the ecdysone receptor
- Universal stress protein, a protein superfamily
- USp (2n), a symplectic group in the mathematics of group theory
- USP grade, a level of chemical purity

== Technology ==
- United States patent
- Heckler & Koch USP pistol
- Ultrashort pulse laser, a laser that emits ultrashort pulses of light, generally of the order of femtoseconds to hundreds of femtoseconds
- Universal Storage Platform, brand name for a Hitachi Data Systems line of enterprise storage arrays
- Unified shader processors, used in GPUs
- USP (Victoria), a Russian satellite bus

== Universities ==
- University of São Paulo, a public university in Brazil
- University of the Sciences in Philadelphia, United States
- University of the South Pacific, a public university with a number of locations in Oceania
- University of Southeastern Philippines, an educational institution in Mindanao, Philippines
- University of Southern Philippines Foundation, an educational institution in Cebu, Philippines
- University Scholars Program, a scholarly community at Duke University; see John Hope Franklin Center for Interdisciplinary and International Studies

== Other uses ==
- Unified settlement planning
- Unique selling proposition / Unique selling point, in marketing
- United States Pharmacopeia
- Urs Samyuktha Paksha, an Indian political party
- Useful space principle, in the game of bridge
- Uttama Seva Padakkama, a military decoration in Sri Lanka
- Uspantek language (ISO 639 code: usp), a Mayan language
- Utrecht Science Park, in The Netherlands
