= UÇK =

UÇK may refer to:

- Kosovo Liberation Army (KLA; Albanian: Ushtria Çlirimtare e Kosovës, UÇK)
- National Liberation Army (NLA; Albanian: Ushtria Çlirimtare Kombëtare, UÇK)

== See also ==
- UCK (disambiguation)
