= Uig =

Uig is a placename meaning "bay" (from Norse) and may refer to:

== Places ==
- Uig, Coll, a hamlet on the island of Coll, Argyll and Bute, Scotland
- Uig, Duirinish, a hamlet near Totaig, on the Isle of Skye, Highland Scotland
- Uig, Lewis, a civil parish on the western cost of the Isle of Lewis, Outer Hebrides, Scotland
- Uig, Snizort, a village and ferry port on the Trotternish peninsula, Isle of Skye, Highland Scotland
- Glenuig (Gleann Ùige), small village in Moidart, Lochaber, Highland
- Uigg, Prince Edward Island, a settlement in Maritime Canada

== Other uses ==
- Uíge, a provincial capital city in northwestern Angola
- Ulster Imperial Guards, loyalist paramilitary group in Northern Ireland
- Uyghur language (ISO 639 code)
