= URL (disambiguation) =

A URL (uniform resource locator), identifies a webpage or other online resource.

URL may also refer to:

== Arts and media ==
- Ultimate Rap League, a battle rap group from New York City
- Url, an ankylosaurus in the 2000 Disney animated film Dinosaur
- URL: Usapang Real Love, Philippine TV series

== Other uses ==
- .url, file extension for Internet shortcut files
- Unrestricted line officer, in the US Navy
- Upper reference limit, of a reference range
- Upper rostral length, of a cephalopod beak
- Urali language (ISO 639-3: url)
- University Ramon Llull, university in Barcelona

== See also ==
- UERL, Underground Electric Railways Company of London
