= UIL =

UIL may mean:

- UIL Holdings Corporation, a natural gas company based in Connecticut, U.S.
- UNESCO Institute for Lifelong Learning, a United Nations educational centre
- Unione Italiana del Lavoro, the Italian Labour Union
- United International Airlines, ICAO designator of a Serbian cargo airline
- United Irish League, a nationalist political party in Ireland from 1898 through the 1920s
- University Interscholastic League, the governing body for public school interscholastic activities in the US state of Texas
- University of Illinois Urbana–Champaign in the United States
- User-in-the-loop, a system theoretic paradigm to change user behavior
- User Interface Language, an X11 application language used by Motif
- Uil, a river of Kazakhstan
