= UGA =

UGA or Uga may refer to:

== People ==
- Elisa Uga, an Italian fencer

=== Characters ===
- Uga (mascot), the live English Bulldog mascot of University of Georgia athletics

== Places ==
- Uga (Lanzarote), a village in Yaiza municipality in the province of Las Palmas, Lanzarote
- Uga, Nigeria, a town in Anambra, Nigeria
- Uqah or Uga, a village in Azerbaijan
- IATA airport code for Bulgan Airport, Bulgan Province, Mongolia

== Organizations, groups, companies ==
- United Game Artists, a second-party developer of computer and video games for SEGA
- United Golf Association was a group of African-American professional golfers who operated a separate series of professional golf tournaments for Blacks during the era of racial segregation
- Air Uganda (ICAO airline code: UGA; IATA airline code: U7)

=== Universities ===
- University of Georgia, a public research university located in Athens, Georgia, United States
- Université Grenoble Alpes, a French public research university located in Grenoble, France

== Computing ==
- User Global Area, part of the System Global Area in Oracle database software
- UXGA or UGA, Ultra Graphics Array

== Science ==
- UGA ("opal" or "umber"), a stop codon within genetic code
- Uga (genus), a genus in subfamily Haltichellinae
- Universal geometric algebra
- The ISO 639-3 code for the Ugaritic language

== See also ==
- Ugas, characters in the Conker series
- Ooga, a game developed by Bolt Creative
