= USNA (disambiguation) =

USNA may refer to:

- United States Naval Academy
- United Service for New Americans, an aid organization to help resettle Jewish survivor of World War II
- United States of North America (disambiguation)
- United States National Army

== See also ==
- Usna (Deirdre legend)
