= Universal Joint Task List =

The Universal Joint Task List, more commonly known as UJTL, is a comprehensive list of possible military tasks at the strategic, operationals and (joint) tactical level of war. The UJTL was developed for the U.S. Armed Forces but it has been used by several other countries and international military organizations such as NATO, sometimes in adapted form and under different names, but usually including the term "task list".

The UJTL is meant to be a tool in operational planning and similar forms of military planning. It gives a menu of capabilities (mission-derived tasks with associated conditions and standards, i.e., the tools) that a joint force commander may select to accomplish the assigned mission. Once identified as essential to mission accomplishment, the tasks are reflected within the command joint mission essential task list.

== Levels in UJTL ==
The UJTL consists of a large number of hierarchically organized military tasks groups in four levels of warfare:

- Strategic National level (SN)
- Strategic Theater level (ST)
- Operational level (OP)
- Tactical level (TA)

The tasks in the list are labeled SN, ST, OP or TA to show which level of warfare they refer to.

== Example of organization of UJTL tasks ==
An example of the hierarchical organization of the UJTL:

- Among the operational level tasks, there are seven top-level tasks, labelled OP 1 through OP 7. OP 1 is "Conduct Operational Movement and Maneuver".
- Subordinate to OP 1, there are six tasks labelled OP 1.1 through OP 1.6, of which OP 1.1 is "Conduct Operational Movement".
- Subordinate to OP 1.1, there are three tasks labelled OP 1.1.1 through OP 1.1.3, of which OP 1.1.2 is "Conduct Intratheater Deployment and Redeployment of Forces within the Joint Operations Area".
- Subordinate to OP 1.1.2, there are two tasks labelled OP 1.1.2.1 and OP 1.1.2.2. OP 1.1.2.1 is "Conduct Airlift in the Joint Operations Area".

The depth of task levels is not the same everywhere: unlike OP 1.1.2, OP 1.1.1 "Formulate Request for Strategic Deployment to a Joint Operations Area" does not have any subordinate tasks, and the same is true for OP 1.6 "Conduct Patient Evacuation".
