= UVM (disambiguation) =

UVM is the University of Vermont, a university in Burlington, Vermont, USA.

UVM may also refer to:

- Universal Verification Methodology, in integrated circuit design
- Universidad del Valle de México, a private university in Mexico
- UVM, a virtual memory system used in BSD-like operating systems including NetBSD
- Undervisningsministeriet, the Danish Ministry of Education
