= USAAS =

USAAS may refer to:

- United States Army Air Service
- United States Army Ambulance Service
