= Universal Communication Format =

Universal communication format is a communication protocol developed by the IEEE for multimedia communication. Y. Hiranaka, H. Sakakibara and T. Taketa of Yamagata University proposed UCF in 2005.

From the abstract:

Various intelligent equipments and software are gradually designed to communicate with other equipment or software. However, any data format that can be considered as universal and almost eternally usable is not available. In this paper, we present UCF as a candidate bidirectional communication data format, and show its typical application for multimedia data. UCF is formed with the object address and the data to be forwarded. Communications can be simply performed by sending UCF data in required directions.

UCF is a proprietary format used by Cisco for their WebEx Web conferencing application.

== See also ==
- UCF FAQ
