= Urus =

Urus may refer to:

- Aurochs, a type of cattle
- 𐌿, a letter of the Gothic alphabet
- Urs, death anniversary of a Sufi saint, mostly observed in South Asia
- Urus Khan (died 1377), a Khan of the Blue Horde between 1374 and 1376
- Uru people, an ethnic group in Bolivia
- Lamborghini Urus, a mid-size SUV from Lamborghini
- Uruş, Beypazarı, Turkey
- Yanarahu (Carhuaz-Huaraz) or Urus, a mountain in Peru
- An annual festival in India; see Jatra (Maharashtra)
