= Ukr =

Ukr, ukr, or UKR may refer to:

- Ukrainian language (ISO 639-2 code: ukr)
- Ukraine, in several types of country codes
- Mukeiras Airport (IATA code: UKR)

== See also ==
- .укр
