= UAH =

UAH may refer to:

- UAH, ISO 4217 currency code of the Ukrainian hryvnia, the national currency of Ukraine
- Universidad Alejandro de Humboldt, Venezuela
- University of Alabama in Huntsville
- University of Alcalá, Spain (Universidad de Alcalá de Henares)
- Alberto Hurtado University, Chile (Universidad Alberto Hurtado)
- University Academy Holbeach, a secondary school in Lincolnshire, UK
