= UML (disambiguation) =

UML may refer to:

- Unified Modeling Language, a software modeling language
- University of Massachusetts Lowell, a research university
- User-mode Linux, virtual machine software
- Communist Party of Nepal (Unified Marxist–Leninist), abbreviated CPN (UML)

== See also ==
- Unified Medical Language System (UMLS), a medical informatics tool
