= UST =

UST or Ust may refer to:

== Organizations ==
- UST (company), American digital technology company
- Equatorial Guinea Workers' Union
- Union of Trade Unions of Chad (Union des Syndicats du Tchad)
- United States Television Manufacturing Corp.
- UST Growling Tigers, men's varsity team
- UST Inc., tobacco company

=== Universities ===
- University of Science and Technology (disambiguation)
  - Hong Kong University of Science and Technology (HKUST)
  - Korea University of Science and Technology in South Korea
- University of Santo Tomas in Manila, Philippines
- University of St. Thomas (Minnesota)
- University of St. Thomas (Texas) in Houston, US

== Places ==
- Northeast Florida Regional Airport, St. Augustine, US, IATA Code
- Oskemen, Kazakhstan: Ust-Kamenogorsk in Russian
- Qala Wust or Ūst, Badakhshan Province, Afghanistan
- Ust-Luga, near Luga Bay of the Gulf of Finland

== Other uses ==
- United States Treaties and Other International Agreements
- Universal System Tubeless, a tubeless tire rim patented by Mavic
- Underground storage tank
- United States Treasury security, a bond issued by the federal government
- Unsepttrium, an unsynthesized chemical element
- .ust, file extension for Utau project files
- Ultimate Success Today, 2020 Protomartyr album
- TerraUSD (by ticker symbol), a stablecoin cryptocurrency developed by Do Kwon
