= Police Operations Tactical Unit =

The Unidad Táctica de Operaciones Policiales (UTOP; Police Operations Tactical Unit) is the riot control unit of Bolivia's National Police. The unit was founded in 1976 as the Grupo Especializado de Seguridad (GES; Specialized Security Group). The unit has been involved in confronting numerous protests and civil disturbances, and provides security around the principal government buildings in La Paz, Bolivia's seat of government.

Initially, the GES was based in the La Paz's wealthy Zona Sur, at a site now occupied by the command center of Police District 4. Its current headquarters is in La Paz, on Junin Street, just northeast of Plaza Murillo, between Indaburo and Ingavi streets.

GES troops engaged in mutinies during times of social protest in April 2000 and February 2003. UTOP troops have also led police mutinies in June 2012, November 2013, and July 2014.

== History ==
The Grupo Especializado de Seguridad was created in 1976.

During the late 1980s, the GES temporarily assumed counterterrorist functions. In March 1987, French police advisers and Bolivian experts began giving a three-month antiterrorism course — consisting of technical and psychological training — to 400 GES members. The purpose of the training was to form a special group for responding to hostage-taking incidents. That June the Bolivian police announced officially the creation of a 22-member antiterrorist command, the Multi-purpose Intervention Brigade (Brigada de Intervention Polivalente — BIP), responsible for solving cases of "uncommon violence," such as kidnapping, hostage taking, and antigovernment uprisings. The government of President Paz Zamora gave responsibility for antiterrorist actions to the Special Elite Antiterrorist Force (Fuerza Especial Antiterrorista de Elite — FEAE).

In April 2000, President Hugo Banzer declared a state of siege in response to the Cochabamba Water War and a general strike by the CSUTCB Peasant Confederation. GES troops refused to participate in policing during the crisis and the government agreed to increases in salary for the police.

Amid protests in February 2003 over a proposed tax on salaries and wages, GES troops mutinied on February 11 and left the city center of La Paz unpoliced. The military was mobilized to the central Plaza Murillo, where they exchanged fire with the GES.

As of 2003, the GES had 21 officers and 235 troops.

In 2013, the government announced the creation of an UTOP unit for El Alto, to consist of 200 troops headquartered in the Huayna Potosí district.
