= Unidad Valor Adquisitivo =

The Unidad de Valor Adquisitivo (UVA) is an Argentinian financial instrument created on 31 March 2016 as a measure of the average construction cost of 10 cm^{2} of a typical housing (one thousandth of a m^{2}). It is thus adjusted for inflation, with the help of the Reference Stabilisation Coefficient (CER — Coeficiente de Estabilización de Referencia).

It was initially based on the cost of different kinds of real estates in the cities of Buenos Aires, Córdoba, Rosario, Salta and the coast area (Santa Fe de la Vera Cruz-Paraná), weighted by population.

It is used to denominate loans (rather than in Pesos), and to denominate fixed-term deposits and savings accounts, giving the economic effect of an Inflation-linked bond in the legal form of a bank deposit.
