= UAB =

UAB may refer to:

- University of Alabama at Birmingham, U.S.
  - UAB Blazers, the university's athletic program
- Autonomous University of Barcelona, Catalonia, Spain
- Underwater Archaeology Branch, Naval History & Heritage Command, a United States Navy unit
- Unemployment Assistance Board, a British governmental authority 1934–1940
- Universal Aryan Brotherhood, a white power prison gang in the United States
- Uždaroji akcinė bendrovė, a type of limited liability company in Lithuania
