= UDT =

UDT may refer to:

== Organisations ==
- Uitgeverij De Tijd, a former Belgian publisher
- Underwater Demolition Team, United States Naval reconnaissance and amphibious landing beach demolition unit from which the U.S. Navy SEALs evolved
- Republic of Korea Navy UDT/SEAL, from the Republic of Korea Navy
- União Democrática Timorense, (Timorese Democratic Union), a conservative political party in East Timor
- Union Démocratique Tchadienne, (Chadian Democratic Union), the second African political party in Chad
- Union Djiboutienne du Travail (Union of Djibouti Workers), a trade union centre in Djibouti
- United Dominions Trust, a subsidiary of the former Trustee Savings Bank, merged with Lloyds Bowmaker in 2001
- Union démocratique du travail, a left-wing Gaullist party

== Computing ==
- UDP-based Data Transfer Protocol, a high-performance data transport protocol and library
- User-defined type, in computer science that is generally synonymous with "record", "structure", "composite type" or "class"

== Technology ==
- Urine Diversion Toilet, a toilet system where urine and faeces are separated at source

== Measurement ==
Underdeck tonnage, a unit of measurement of a ship's weight
