= USR =

USR may refer to:

- USRobotics, a technology firm
- USR (Guadeloupe football club), in Sainte-Rose, Guadeloupe
- U.S. Robots and Mechanical Men, a fictional robot manufacturer
- /usr, directory in Unix systems, see Filesystem Hierarchy Standard
- A variant of the Steyr AUG, assault rifle
- Save Romania Union, a Romanian political party
- Union of Serbs of Romania, a Romanian political party
- USR (BASIC) ("User Serviceable Routine"), a common BASIC instruction to execute native machine code
- Upward Sun River site, archaeological site in Alaska
- Uxbridge and South Ruislip, a parliamentary constituency in the United Kingdom
- Unión Santafesina de Rugby, body that rules the game of rugby union in Santa Fe, Argentina

== See also ==
- μSR, Muon Spin Rotation or muon spin spectroscopy
- USSR (disambiguation)
