= Uniform Communication Standard =

Data interchange standard

'Uniform Communication Standard (UCS) is an Electronic Data Interchange (EDI) standard used primarily by grocery and retail-oriented industries for e-commerce. It is an industry subset of the ANSI X12 national EDI standard.

The standard facilitates logistics allowing trading partners to automate ordering, billing, and inventory management processes. UCS introduced new forms of electronic record-keeping and transaction processing, which created both efficiencies and new risks for smaller retailers with limited loss-prevention resources.

== Usage ==
While starting in the grocery side of business, current users of UCS include:

- manufacturers
- retailers
- wholesalers
- brokers
- beverage (alcohol)
- convenience stores
- food service industries
- wholesale drug
- mass merchandising
- service merchandising
- public warehousing

== History ==
In the 1960s, the Transportation Data Coordinating Committee [TDCC], whose work later evolved into the ANSI X12|X12 standard began developing Electronic Data Interchange [EDI] standards primarily for transportation. From there, a variety of EDI implementations took root, including UCS. The original draft was designed by companies representing some of the industries noted earlier. By 1976 the design of an EDI standard was underway. It would take six years before the standard saw its first usage.

== Scope ==
UCS supports both office-to-office (batch) and DSD, or "direct store delivery," transactions. The latter is an interactive method designed to replace paperwork by allowing systems ranging from small hand-held devices to large mainframe computers to be able to exchange delivery and return data.
