= UPF =

UPF may refer to:

== Organisations ==
- Union internationale de la presse francophone, an association of Francophone journalists
- Uganda Police Force, the national police force of Uganda
- Universal Peace Federation, an organization of the Unification Church

=== Education ===
- Universidad Paulo Freire, a university in Nicaragua
- Universidade de Passo Fundo, a university in Brazil
- Universitat Pompeu Fabra, a university in Spain
- Université de la Polynésie Française, a university in Tahiti
- University Press of Florida, a scholarly press

=== Politics ===
- Unified Popular Front, a political party in Iraq
- Union populaire française, a breakaway section of the French Communist Party, 1939
- Union pour la France, an electoral coalition in France, 1992–1997
- United Patriots Front, Australian street protest movement
- United People's Front of Nepal, a political organization
- United Popular Front, a Greek political party
- Up-Country People's Front, a political party in Sri Lanka
- Upsurging People's Force, a militant group in Sri Lanka
- UPF-Centre for Animal Ethics, an animal advocacy think tank based at Pompeu Fabra University

=== Sport ===
- Universal Peace Foundation, a Palauan association football club

== Places ==
- Upper Palatine Forest, a mountain range in Central Europe
- Ustʹ Pinega Formation, a geological formation in Russia

== Science and technology ==
- Ultraviolet Protection Factor, a rating for sun protective clothing
- Ultra-processed food, a grouping of processed food
- Unified Power Format, a file format for electronic power intent

== Other uses ==
- Utah Pride Festival, an LGBT festival in Salt Lake City, Utah, US

== See also ==
- Überwachung Post- und Fernmeldeverkehr (ÜPF), a Swiss intelligence agency
