= USAIC =

USAIC may refer to either:

- United States Army Infantry Center
- United States Army Intelligence Center
