= Ortrud =

- Gender: Feminine

Other names
- Variant form: Ortraud
- Related names: Ortrude

Ortrud is a feminine given name, with variant forms Ortraud and Ortrude.

Ortrud may refer to:

- Ortrud, a character in Richard Wagner's opera Lohengrin
- Ortrud Beginnen (1938–1999), German film actress
- Ortrud Mavrin, a character in Anthony Powell's second novel Venusberg (1932)
- Ortrud Oellermann (active from 1981), South African mathematician
- 551 Ortrud, a main-belt asteroid
