= UDP =

UDP may refer to:

== Political parties ==
- Ulster Democratic Party, in Northern Ireland
- União Democrática Popular (Popular Democratic Union (Portugal))
- Unidad Democrática y Popular (Democratic and Popular Union), a former Bolivian umbrella party
- Union for Democracy and Progress, in Mauritania
- United Democratic Party (disambiguation), multiple organisations

== Science and technology ==
- Undecaprenyl phosphate, a bacterial cell membrane carrier lipid
- Uridine diphosphate, an organic chemical
- User Datagram Protocol, a network communications method
- User Defined Primitive, a construct in Verilog
- Usenet Death Penalty, a discussion group disciplinary response
- Universality–diversity paradigm

== Other uses ==
- Unit Deployment Program, a military assignment system
- Unitary development plan, a land use planning system
- Universidad Diego Portales (Diego Portales University), in Chile
