= UA =

UA may refer to:

== Arts and entertainment ==
=== Gaming ===
- Unearthed Arcana, a Dungeons & Dragons sourcebook
- Unknown Armies, a tabletop role-playing game
- Urban Assault, a first-person shooter and real-time strategy computer game

=== Other uses in arts and entertainment ===
- Ua (singer) (born 1972), a Japanese singer-songwriter
- United Abominations, an album by the band Megadeth
- United Artists, a film production & distribution company owned by Amazon MGM Studios
- The Umbrella Academy, a graphic novel by Gerard Way

== Organizations ==
=== Non-cooperative businesses ===
- Under Armour, an American clothing brand (NYSE ticker: UA)
- Union Association, a baseball league of 1884
- United Airlines, a major American airline headquartered in Chicago, Illinois (IATA airline designator: UA)
- Universal Audio (company), a designer and manufacturer of audio signal processing hardware and software
- UP Aerospace, a private spaceflight company based in Denver, Colorado

=== Universities and university consortiums ===
- University Alliance, a lobbying group of British universities
- University of Abra, a public university in Abra, Philippines
- University of Akron, a public research university in Akron, Ohio, United States
- University of Alabama, a public research university located in Tuscaloosa, Alabama, United States
- University of Alaska system, a university system in Alaska created in 1975

- University of Alaska Anchorage, the largest university by enrollment in the system
- University of Alaska Fairbanks, the first university and flagship (known from 1925 to 1975 simply as the University of Alaska)
- University of Alaska Southeast, located in the capital city of Juneau, and the smallest by enrollment

- University of Alicante, a public university in Alicante, Spain
- University of Antwerp, one of the major Belgian universities located in the city of Antwerp
- University of Arizona, a public research university in Tucson, Arizona, United States
- University of Arkansas, a public, co-educational, land-grant, space-grant, research university in Fayetteville, Arkansas, United States

=== Other organizations ===
- ultrAslan, a fan group of the Galatasaray Spor Kulübü football team
- United Association, a plumbing and pipefitting labor union in the US and Canada

== Military ==
- Future Force unit of action, a proposed US Army tactical unit
- German submarine UA, a German submarine of the Second World War
- German Type UA submarine, of the First World War
- SM UA, a First World War submarine of Imperial Germany
- Ukrainian Army, alternate moniker for the Ukrainian Ground Forces
- Unauthorized absence, a key term for the abandonment of a duty or post without permission (United States)

== Places ==
- UA, ISO 3166-1 alpha 2 country code for Ukraine
- Uttaranchal, a state in India formerly abbreviated as UA in vehicle registration plates
- Upper Arlington, Ohio

== Science and technology ==
=== Biology and medicine ===
- Unstable angina, a type of heart disease
- Uric acid, a metabolic compound
- Urinalysis (also U/A), a set of medical diagnostic tests performed on urine

=== Computing and telecommunications ===
- .ua, the Internet country code top-level domain for Ukraine
- User agent, a computer networking software class
- User assistance, computer programme manuals and documentation
- Universal Acceptance, a principle regarding top-level domains
- OPC Unified Architecture, a protocol used in industry 4.0 for inter machine communication

=== Other uses in science and technology ===
- Unmanned aircraft or unmanned aerial vehicle
- Microampere (uA, properly μA), a unit of electric current defined as one-millionth of an ampere
- UA, the product of a heat exchanger's overall heat transfer coefficient U and its active exchange area A in thermodynamics

== Other uses ==
- Unit of account, in economics, a standard numerical monetary unit of measurement
- Unitary authority, a type of local authority that is responsible for all local government functions within its area
- Urban area or urban agglomeration, a human settlement with high population density and infrastructure of built environment

== See also ==
- U of A (disambiguation)
- Ursuline (disambiguation)
