= Uru =

Uru or URU may refer to:

== Language ==
- Uru dialect of Central Kilimanjaro, a Bantu language of Tanzania
- Uru language, the extinct language of the Uros, an Amerindian people
- Urumi language, an extinct language of the Amazon region of Brazil
- URU (Sumerogram), a relatively distinctive sign in the cuneiform sign lists
- Urú, the addition of a preceding letter to indicate eclipsis in the Irish language; see Irish initial mutations § Eclipsis (urú)

== Places ==
- Uruguay, IOC country code
- Üru, a village in Saare County, Estonia
- Uru, Iran, a village in Razavi Khorasan Province, Iran
- Uru, São Paulo, a city in Brazil
- Uru Uru Lake, a lake south of the Bolivian town of Oruro
- Uru Harbour Airport, an airport on Malaita, Solomon Islands
- Uru River (Goiás), a river of central Brazil
- Uru River (Maranhão), a river of northeastern Brazil
- Uyu River, or Uru River, a river of Myanmar
- Rafael Urdaneta University, a university in Venezuela
- Uru Shimbwe, town in Tanzania

== People ==
- Uru people, a group of pre-Incan people who live in Peru and Bolivia
- Henare Uru (1872–1929), New Zealand Maori politician
- Hopere Uru (1868–1921), New Zealand Maori politician
- Storm Uru (born 1985), New Zealand rower
- Uru (singer), a Japanese female singer.
- Black Uhuru, Reggae Musicians

== Media ==
- Uttarakhand Residential University, a state university in Uttarakhand, India
- Uru (comics), the fictional metal in Marvel Comics, from which Thor's hammer Mjolnir is made
- Uru (The Lion King), a fictional lioness character
- Uru: Ages Beyond Myst, a 2003 computer game
  - Myst Online: Uru Live, a 2007 online version of the original game
- Uru (2017 film), a Tamil-language horror thriller film
- Uru (2023 film), a Malayalam-language drama film

== Other ==
- Uru (boat), an ancient trading vessel
- Spot-winged wood quail, a bird from Latin America
- Mekanika Uru, a submachine gun
- Uruguayan Rugby Union

== See also ==
- Uhuru (disambiguation)
- Urus (disambiguation)
