= UNOSOM =

UNOSOM (United Nations Operation in Somalia) may refer to:

- UNOSOM I, an operation established in April 1992 and running until its duties were assumed by the UNITAF mission in December 1992
- UNOSOM II, an operation from March 1993 until March 1995
- UNITAF, an operation from December 1992 until May 1993
- Operation Provide Relief (Part of UNITAF)

== See also ==
- Unisom, a brand name of diphenhydramine
- Operation Deliverance, the concurrent Canadian operation
