= Technical University of Manabi =

University in Portoviejo, Ecuador

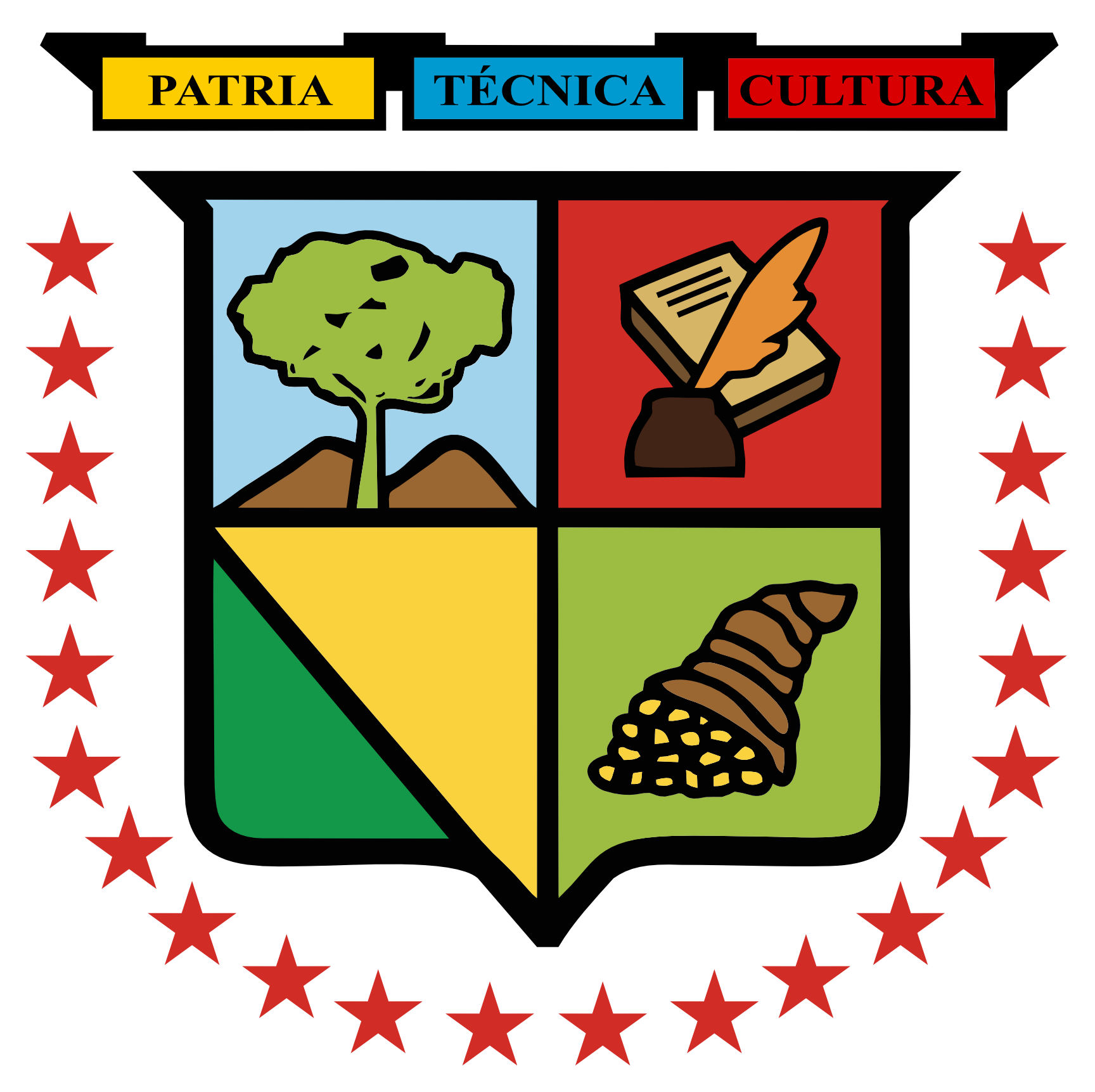
- Shield UTM
- Other name: The Technique
- Motto: Latin: Patria, ars et cultus
- Motto in English: Homeland, Technique and Culture
- Type: Public research university
- Established: 25 June 1954; 72 years ago
- Founder: Engr. Paulo Emilio Sabando Macías
- Academic affiliations: CES; SENESCYT; REDU; CEDIA; THE RABIDA; REDU; Carolina Foundation; AUIP
- Budget: $ 49.622.904,11 million (2022)
- Chancellor: Santiago Quiroz Fernández, Ph.D.
- Vice-Chancellor: Mara Molina Naranjo, Ph.D.
- Faculty: 1,116 (2023)
- Students: Approx. 37,500 (2023)
- Undergraduates: 25,995 (face to face classes), 8,937 (online classes)
- Postgraduates: 2,911
- Location: Portoviejo, Ecuador; 1°2′39″S 80°27′21″W
- Campus: 398 ha
- Colours
- Website: www.utm.edu.ec

The Technical University of Manabí (UTM), is a public institution of higher education located in the city of Portoviejo, Manabí, Ecuador. It was founded on October 29, 1952, in the presidential government of Dr. José María Velasco Ibarra. Its three substantive functions are: scientific research, the academy and relationship with society; intervenes with quality in all spheres and sectors, both public and private, through the support of students, teachers and authorities. It offers undergraduate and postgraduate studies in various specialties and modalities.

The Technical University of Manabí has full powers to organize itself within the provisions of the Constitution of the Republic of Ecuador, the Organic Law of Higher Education, its Regulations, other related laws, the Organic Statute of the Technical University of Manabí and the regulations issued to structure the organization of the institution. Currently the institution is accredited within the Higher Education System of Ecuador, for a period of five years, by Resolution of the Higher Education Quality Assurance Council (CACES).

The rankings that place the Technical University of Manabí among the best universities in Latin America are the Quacquarelli Symonds Ranking (QS) and the StuDocu World University Ranking. Other rankings that the public institution has are Scimago (SJR), Webometrics rankings and Times Higher Education.

== History ==
Ecuador in the 50's, under the government of Mr. Galo Plaza Lasso, entered into a modernization process, responding to technological advances in Latin America. In this context and taking into account that Ecuador and the Manabí province were eminently agricultural, it was necessary to create a higher education institution that offers professionals that meet the academic demands of the province and the country. This is how the Technical University of Manabí was created by the leadership of Dr. Julio Marín, representative for Manabí, and the support of Emilio Bowen Roggiero and Silvio Mora Bowen from Manabí, in the government of Dr. José María Velasco Ibarra, through Decree Legislative of October 29, 1952. The president of the republic, Dr. José María Velasco Ibarra, put the corresponding execution on November 21, 1952; however, the Technical University of Manabí did not start its work until June 25, 1954, the latter date being the one that actually commemorates its creation anniversary. The first rector of the institution was Engineer Paulo Emilio Macías Sabando, through Agreement No. 407, signed by the president of the republic. Engr. Paulo Emilio Macías is recognized as the architect of the University, because he managed to make the project a reality through brilliant management, which gave prestige to the Alma Mater internationally. The UTM is created with the Faculties of Agricultural Engineering and Veterinary Medicine, with majors in agronomic engineering, agricultural engineering and veterinary medicine.

== Rectors ==
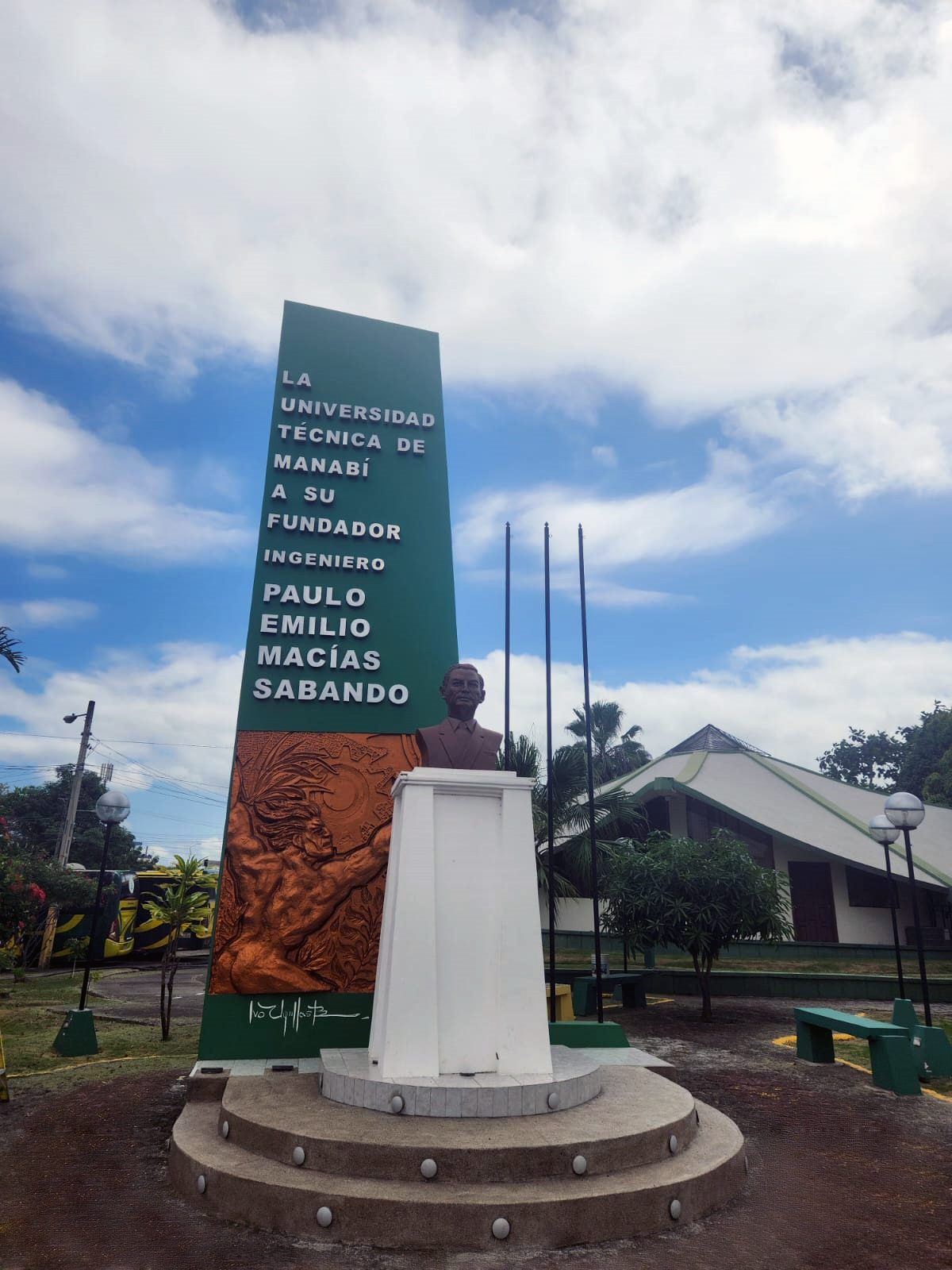
Monument Paulo Emilio Macías Sabando

The rectors of the Technical University of Manabí since its foundation in 1952 have been:

- Paulo Emilio Macías Sabando (1954–1966)
- Ignacio Hidalgo Villavicencio (1967–1970)
- José Manzo Quiñones (1970–1972)
- Francisco Flor Cedeño (1972–1973)
- Medardo Manciati Reyes (1973–1977)
- José Delgado Robles (1979–1983)
- Guido Arroyo Muentes (1983–1986)
- José Toro García (1986–1987)
- Guido Álava Párraga (1987–1996)
- Vicente Beltrón López (1996–1997)
- José Félix Véliz Briones (1997–2012)
- Vicente Véliz Briones (2012–2022)
- Santiago Quiroz Fernández (2022–Present)

== Administration ==
The co-government of the Technical University of Manabí emanates from its teachers, students, employees and workers, in the proportions established in the Higher Education Law and is exercised hierarchically by the following organizations and authorities:

1. Honorable University Council.
2. Rector.
3. Academic Vice President.
4. Honorable Faculty Board of Directors.
5. Deans.
6. Directors of Institutes.
7. Vice-Deans.
8. Departmental Coordinators.

The current authorities of the UTM are:

- Chancellor: Dr. Santiago Quiroz Fernández, Ph.D.
- Academic Vice Chancellor: Dr. Mara Molina, Ph.D.
- General Secretary: Atty. Gary Loor Fernandez.
- Attorney: Atty. Abner Bello Molina

== Educative offer ==
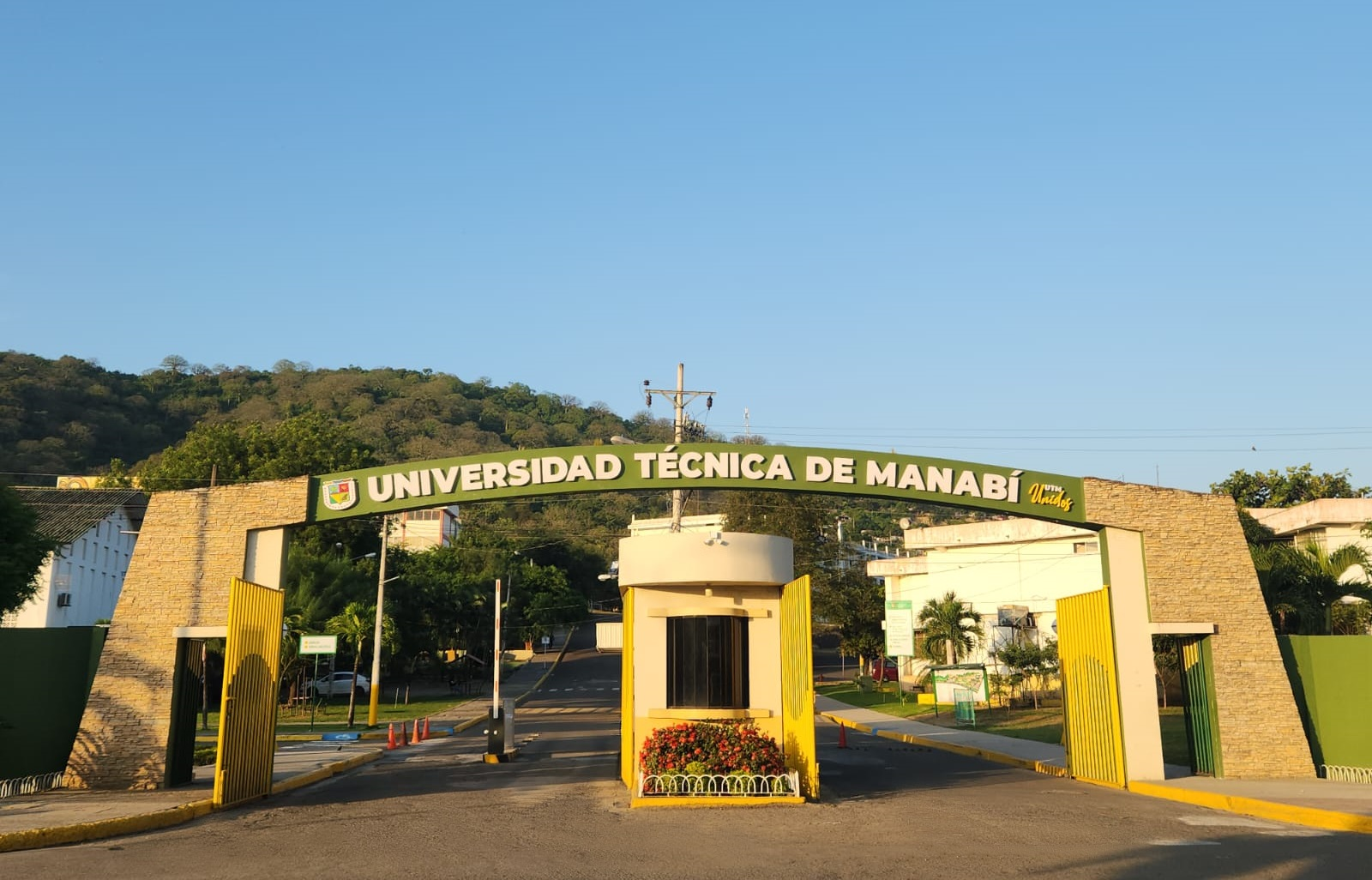
Technical University of Manabi

Currently, the UTM has 13 Faculties, of which 12 are oriented towards Undergraduate education and the Graduate Faculty towards Master's/PhD programs.

=== Undergraduate ===
The Technical University of Manabí offers the largest number of careers in the city of Portoviejo, it also has three extensions in strategic locations, where careers are offered according to the needs of the area; Thus, in the Lodana parish of the Santa Ana canton, the faculties of Veterinary Sciences, Agricultural Sciences and Agronomic Sciences function; in Chone is the Faculty of Zootechnical Sciences; and in Bahía de Caráquez, Sucre canton, the School of Aquaculture and Fisheries. The headquarters building of the Technical University of Manabi in the city of Quito allows students from the Sierra and Oriente area to take the end-of-semester exams.

The Technical University of Manabí has an undergraduate academic program of 12 Faculties that offer 56 Undergraduate Degrees under the face-to-face, online and hybrid modalities, which are detailed below:

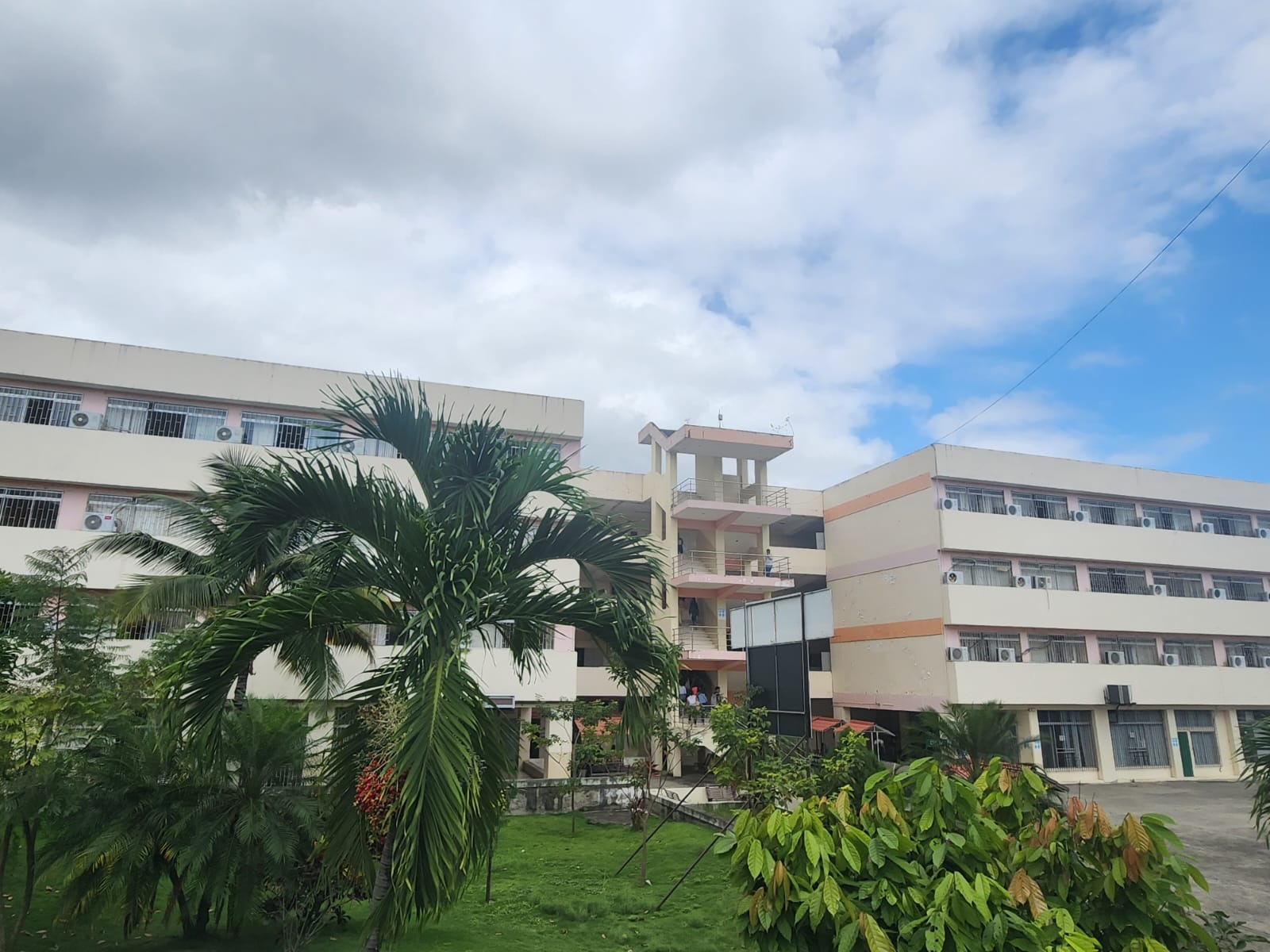
Faculty of Administrative and Economic Sciences

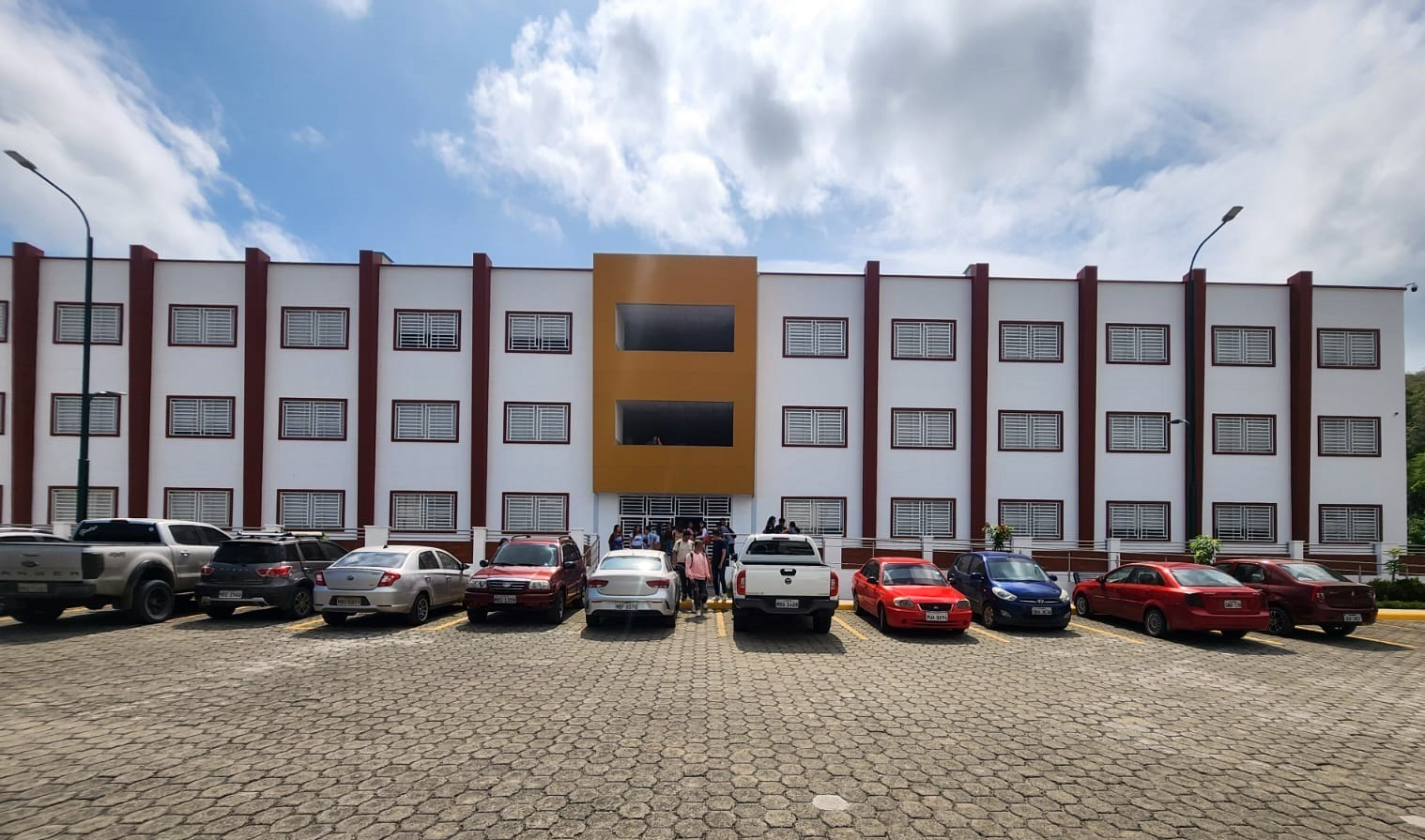
Faculty of Humanistic and Social Sciences

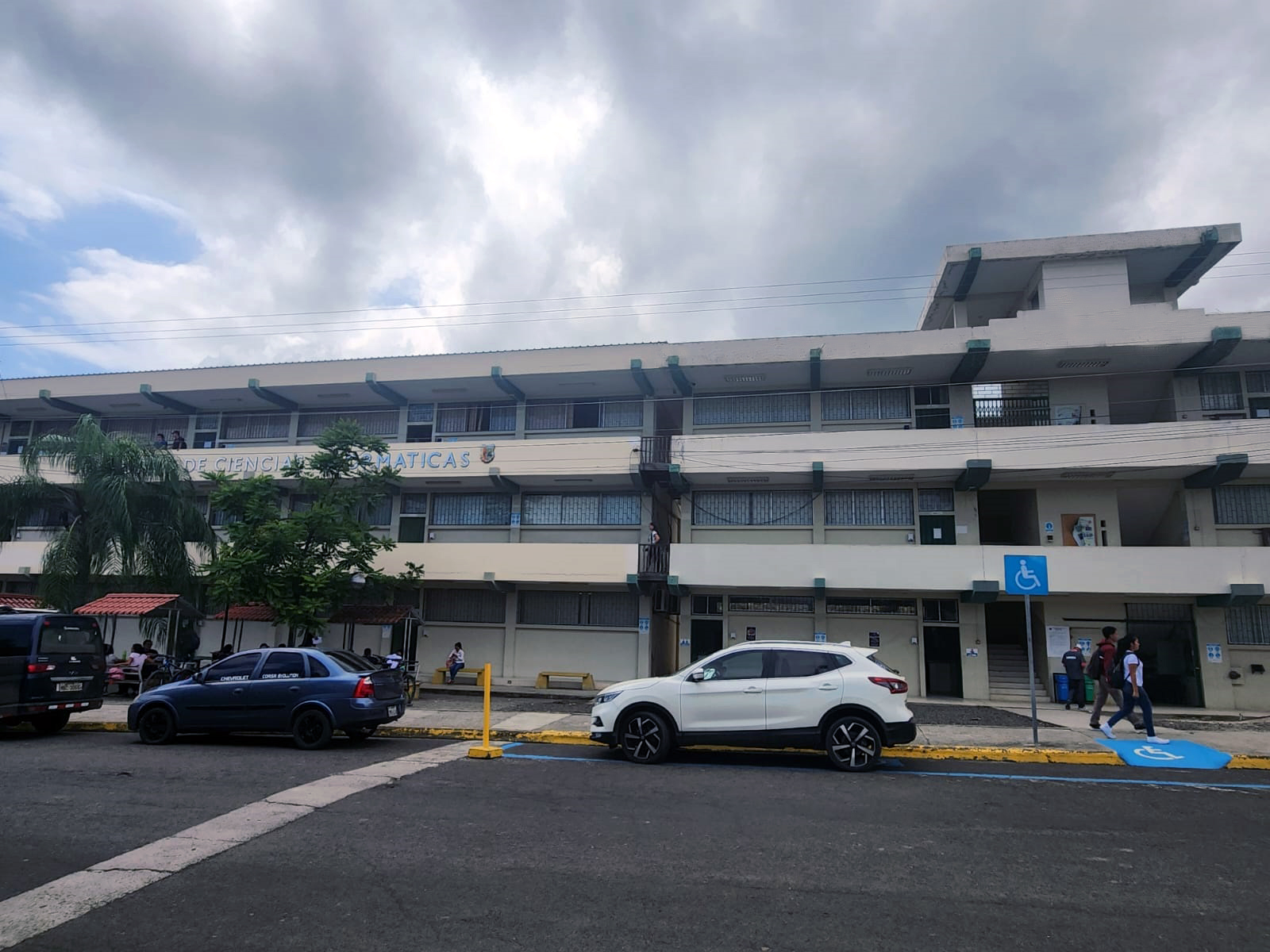
Faculty of Computer Science

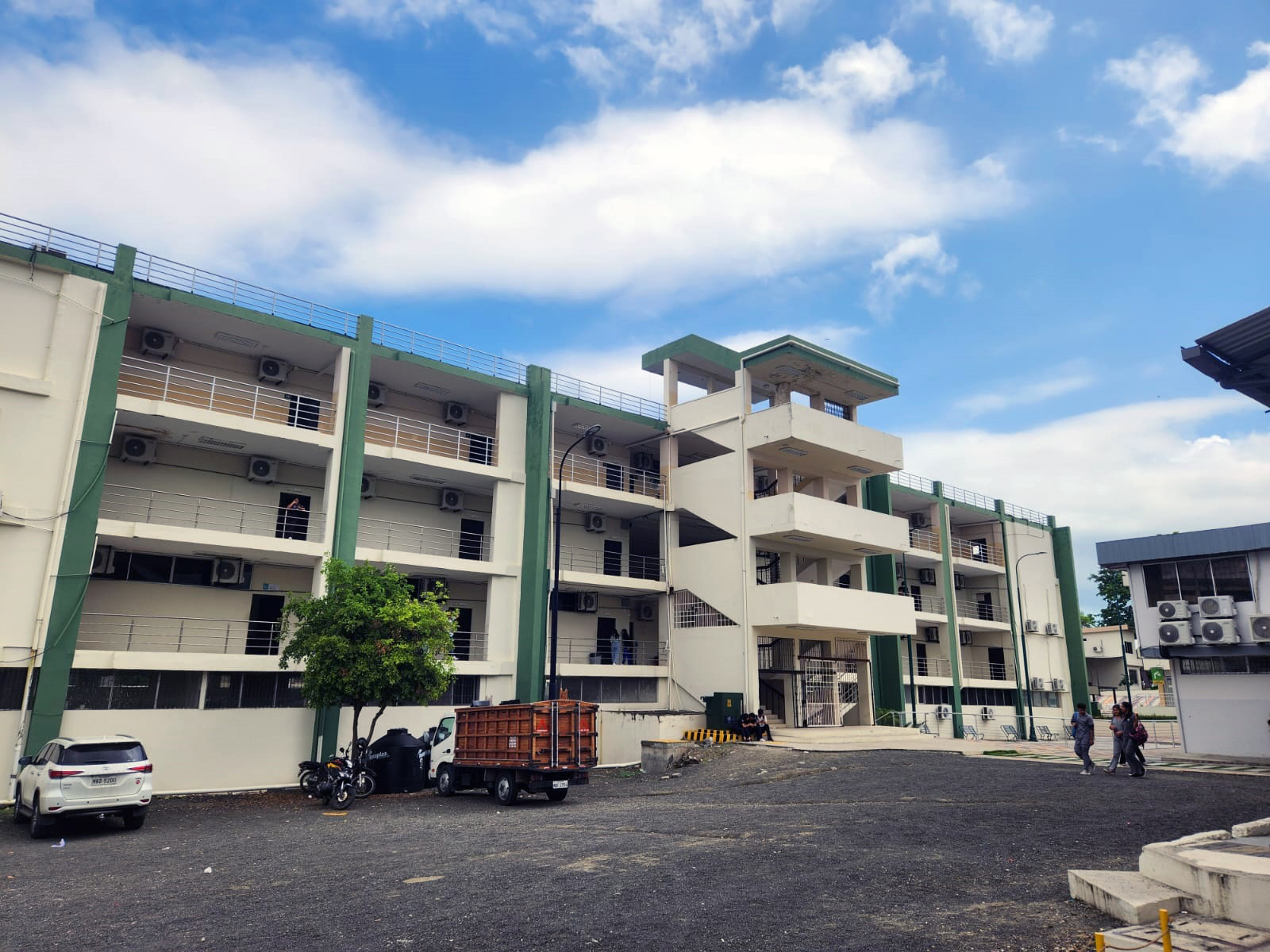
Faculty of Philosophy, Letters and Education Sciences

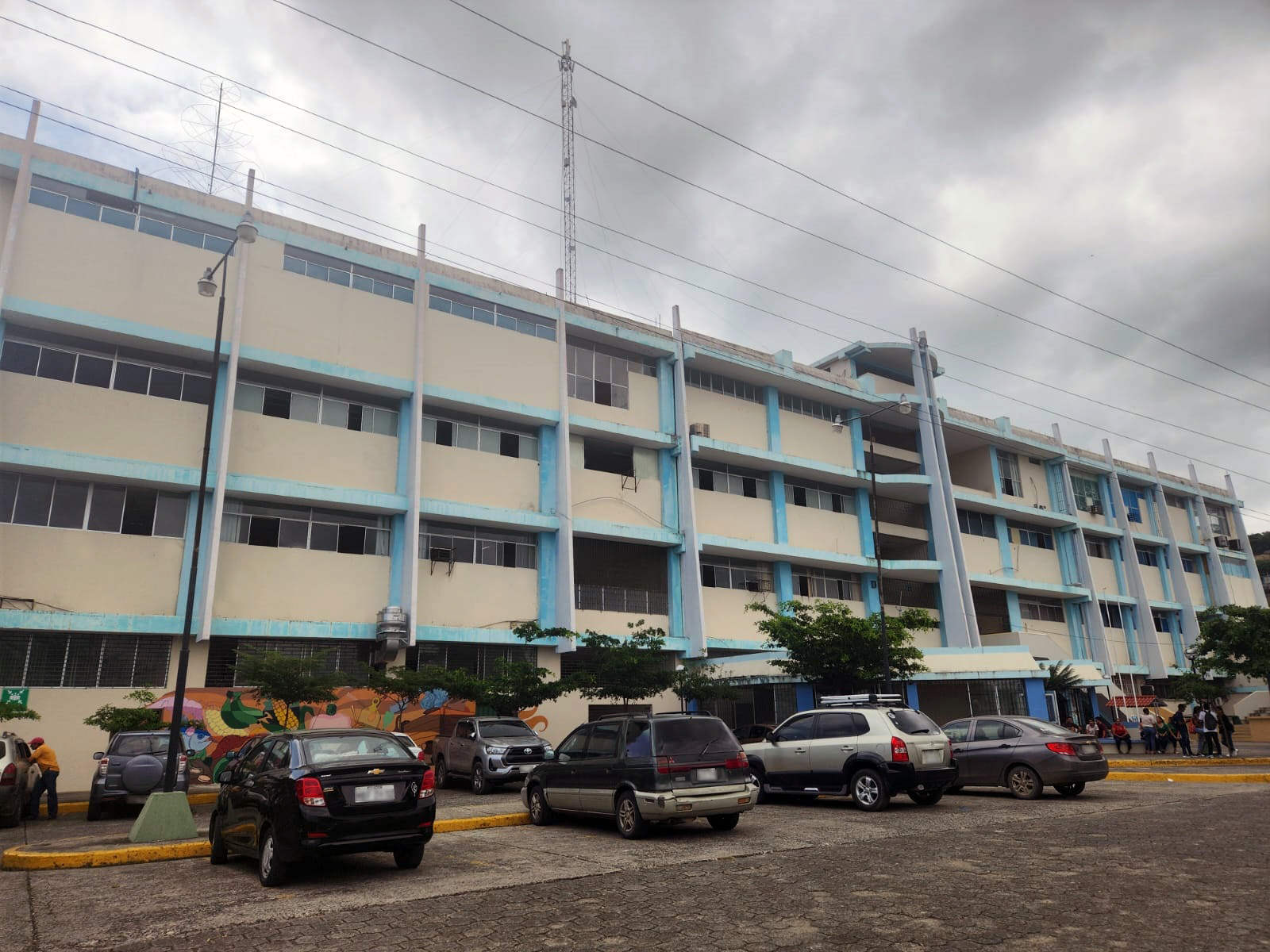
Faculty of Health Sciences

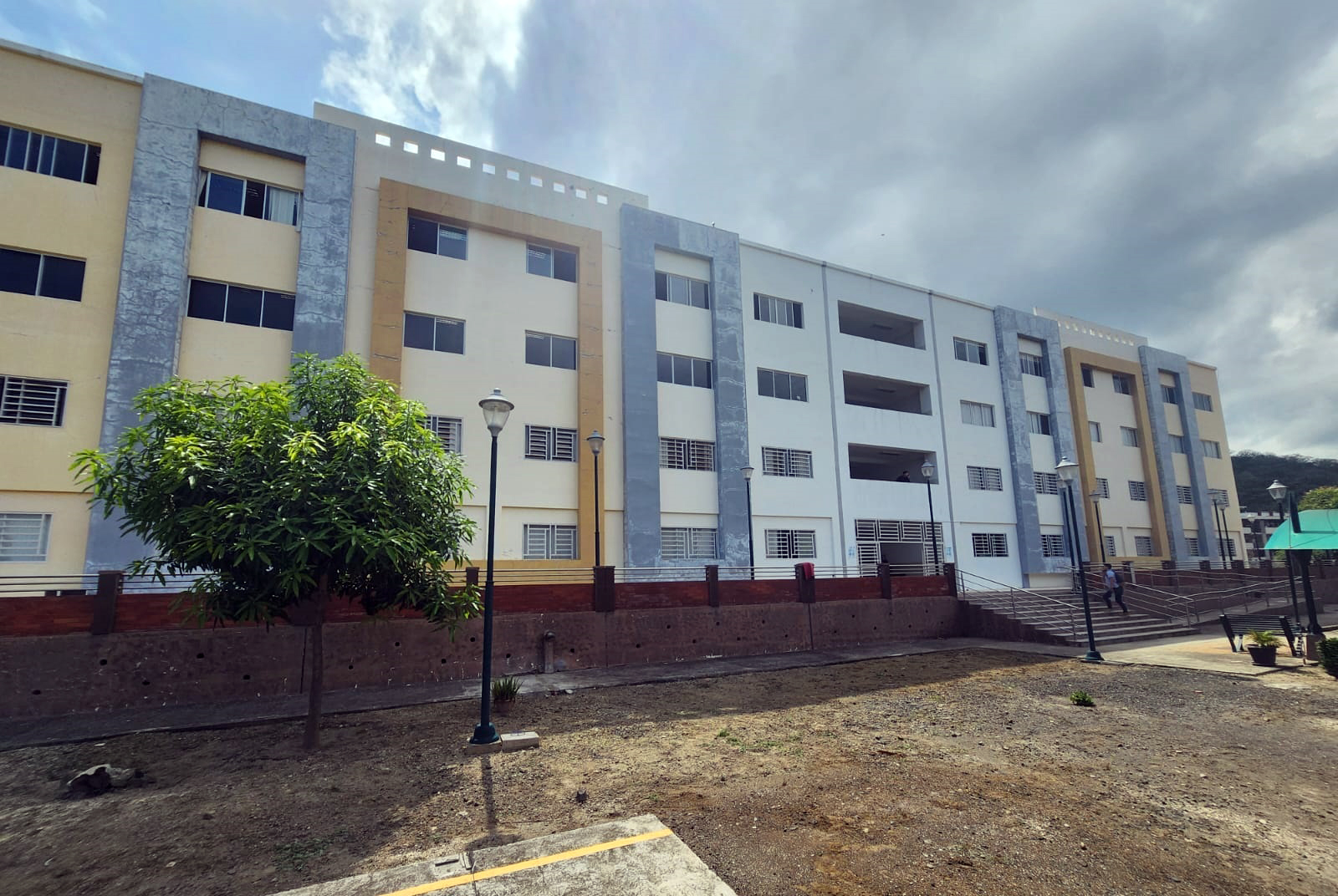
Faculty of Mathematical, Physical and Chemical Sciences

=== Postgraduate ===
The Graduate School (FP) is the academic unit in charge of planning, organizing and executing fourth level programs. The Technical University of Manabí has 72 current Postgraduate programs.

== Institutes ==
The Technical University of Manabí has three Institutes, which are:

- Research Institute: contributes to the development of scientific research at the Technical University of Manabí through the generation of projects that support the training programs of undergraduate and postgraduate students, as well as the link with the public and private sector.
- Admission and Leveling Institute: promotes the academic offer and provides guidance on the admission processes for high school students. Likewise, it provides advisory services to teachers and students at the baccalaureate level on the processes, requirements and conditions for admission to HEIs, established in the higher education and training regulations; as well as, it trains teachers and high school students regarding the skills required for admission to higher education institutions.
- Institute of Languages: created on November 19, 2001, the Institute of Languages guarantees the teaching of languages to its students. Students take 5 levels to reach level B1 of English.

== Enterprise ==
- EMSERVING-EP: Public Company of General Services and Engineering UTM.

== Scientific Journals ==
The current journals of the institution are:

- The Technique: Journal of Agrosciences.
- ECA Synergy: Journal for the areas of Administrative, Accounting and Economic Sciences.
- RECUS: Electronic Journal Cooperation University Society.
- ReHuSo: Journal of Humanistic and Social Sciences.
- Science Foundations: Journal for the areas of Biology, Physics, Mathematics, Chemistry and Geosciences.
- QhaliKay: Health Sciences Journal.
- RIEMAT: Journal of Investigations in Energy, Environment and Technology.
- Cognosis: Journal of Philosophy, Letters and Education Sciences.
- Computing and Systems (IS): Journal of Information Technology and Communications.
- AquaTechnica: Ibero-American Journal of Aquaculture.
- Nullius: Legal journal of the UTM.
- Psidial: Journal of Psychology and Dialogue of Knowledge.
- Repha: Journal of American History, Heritage, Archeology and Anthropology, edited by the "Puruhá" Research Group and the UTM.
- Pedagogical Orbit: Journal of Educational Sciences (Natural, Exact, Social Sciences, etc.), edited by the Huambo Higher Institute of Educational Sciences and the UTM.

== University services ==
The services offered by the Technical University of Manabí are the following:

- Services aimed at teachers, administrators, workers and retirees.
  - UTM General Archive: consultation loan of bibliographic material and serial publications to external users. Internal loan of documentary heritage.
  - Public Relations: coverage and dissemination of academic, research and outreach events through the official media. Advertising of academic events.
  - Graduate Faculty: plans, organizes and executes fourth level programs.
- Services directed to students.
  - Undergraduate Academic Management: undergraduate university educational training service.
  - Postgraduate Academic Management: postgraduate university educational training service.
  - Inclusion, Social Equity and Gender Unit: promotes actions that make it possible to eliminate discriminatory paradigms and stereotypes.
  - Pre-professional Practices and Internships: helps students prepare for professional development.
  - Central Library “Dr. Alejandro Muñoz Dávila”: according to Eng. José Luis Molina (2013) it is the largest in the province of Manabí with more than 20,000 books, with 1,800 m² and capacity for 610 people, it has free access to the web through open internet and is visited mainly by students and the general public. In addition, it provides access to scientific virtual libraries (EBSC, E-book, OvidSP, EBL, etc.) in agreement with the UTM.
  - Institute of Languages: face-to-face and virtual training for students of the English and French languages. Processes of validation and homologation of the aforementioned languages.
- Services aimed at the university community.
  - General Directorate of Links with the Company: dissemination and performance of linkage activities with the company managed by the dependencies attached to the Directorate. Training for UTM teachers to strengthen the substantive function of linking with society.
  - Student Wellness Unit:provides comprehensive medical care in nutrition, psychology, dentistry, nursing, general medicine, social work, cardiovascular rehabilitation, physiotherapy, scholarships, pharmacy, and clinical laboratory services.
  - Culture Unit: loan of material from the repository "The Archive of Memory" in the required formats. Interviews with bearers of ancestral knowledge in texts, videos and audios.
  - Bus service: oriented to the service of teachers, employees and students mainly for tours and study practices to different places in the province and the country; they make tours of Portoviejo-Lodana and Lodana-Portoviejo.
- Services directed to the community.
  - Admission and Leveling Institute: the Institute of Admission and Leveling of the UTM has as fundamental objectives to increase the admission of students of fiscal colleges in the UTM through training and support, identify the psychosocial characteristics and orientation needs of high school students to efficiently address the admission processes to Ecuadorian HEIs, develop thinking skills and strengthen knowledge to improve performance in the admission test, promote correct decision-making based on self-knowledge and career profile, and finally, develop skills and attitudes that allow career leveling students to have a successful start in their personal and professional training in the career of their choice.
  - Free Legal Clinic: service oriented to criminal matters, childhood and adolescence, domestic violence.
  - Simulation Clinic and Laboratories: space to replicate situations that are experienced in hospitals and that allow students to develop the attitudes and skills necessary to carry out pre-professional practices in which they have contact with people.
  - Veterinary Clinic: its philosophy is to offer everything necessary for the care of your pet (dogs and cats), teaching how preventive medicine can extend its life, always incorporating advances in veterinary medicine and treating your pet as one of the family . It provides a series of services to the community with highly qualified personnel.
  - Center for Monitoring Graduates and Labor Insertion: training and continuing education for the acquisition of new skills and abilities demanded by the work environment of graduates.
  - UTM Botanical Garden: it is a recreational place with free access, it has a wide collection of living plants (ornamental, medicinal, forest or fruit), it is visited by many people to be in contact with nature.
  - Polyphonic Choir of the UTM: the choir was founded in 1992, it is made up of students of the Artistic Education career and other specialties of Alma Mater, it has a recognized trajectory in the province of Manabí, standing out in its presentations in different national festivals . The songs that the choir sings are national, popular and classical music; thus spreading culture among people.

== Institutional identity ==
The institutional identity is formed by the Day of the UTM, Hymn, Shield and Flag.

=== Day of the UTM ===
It is established as "Day of the Technical University of Manabí", June 25, because on a date like this, in the year 1954, institutional activities began, which is why a Solemn Session is held every year, as an act center of the celebration.

=== Hymn ===
The lyrics of the Hymn of the Technical University of Manabí correspond to the poem whose author is the Lcdo. Horacio Hidrovo Penaherrera. The music corresponds to Lcdo. Soler Mendieta Aguirre.

Hymn of the Technical University of Manabí
Lyrics: Horacio Hidrovo
Music: Soler Mendieta
CHORUS
Stand up youth of my town
legion of sublime idea
that your voice of infinite truth
in the centuries recorded will remain.
VERSE
Through the hills of Alfaro you can hear
your word of science and justice
and on the wide roads of the montubios
it is a flag of faith and hope.
CHORUS
Standing fight flags
forward clarions of triumph
to run through the open channels
for the country to live or die.

=== Shield ===
The Shield of the Technical University of Manabí corresponds to the one designed by the artist and poet from Manabí Manuel Andrade Ureta. It is based on the colors of the National Emblem, on which are engraved the words: HOMELAND, TECHNIQUE AND CULTURE, which the university has adopted as its motto. Gold stars that represent the cantons that form the provincial unit stand out as they envelop the Shield.

- In the first upper space on the left, a ceibo, a hundred-year-old tree, symbol of the Province of Manabí, rises towards the clear sky of the Homeland.
- In the second upper space on the right, on a red background, there is a book on which rests an inkwell and a pen, essential elements for the study and expression of thought.
- In the third lower space on the right, on a light green background, there is a horn of plenty in gold, spilling coins, product of the creative effort of the men who populate this vast national area and who will be more prosperous with the existence from his university,
- In the fourth space, divided into two diagonal stripes, are the colors yellow gold and olive green, which the university has adopted as its own.

=== Flag ===
The Flag of the Technical University of Manabí is made up of two horizontal stripes: the upper one is golden yellow and the lower one is olive green.

== See also ==
- List of universities in Ecuador
