= UDTS =

UDTS may mean:

- Union Démocratique des Travailleurs de Sénégal, the Democratic Union of Senegalese Workers
- Uppsala-DLR Trojan Survey
- Upper Deerfield Township Schools
