= UPS =

UPS commonly refers to:

- Uninterruptible power supply, a device which provides continuous power to electronics
- United Parcel Service, an American courier company

UPS or ups may also refer to:

== Companies and organizations ==
=== United Parcel Service subsidiaries ===
- The UPS Store, a retail subsidiary
- UPS Airlines, a cargo airline

=== Other companies and organizations ===
- Underground Press Syndicate, later Alternative Press Syndicate or APS
- Union Progressiste Sénégalaise, the former name of the Socialist Party of Senegal
- Universal Pantheist Society
- Universal Press Syndicate
- United Photoplay Service, a Chinese film company in the 1930s

== Universities ==
- Université Paul Sabatier (Paul Sabatier University), Toulouse, France
- University of Puget Sound, Tacoma, Washington, US

== Science, technology, and medicine ==
- Uninterruptible power supply
- Unpentseptium, an unsynthesized chemical element with atomic number 157 and symbol Ups
- Ubiquitin-proteasome system
- Ultraviolet photoelectron spectroscopy
- Universal Polar Stereographic coordinate system
- Ups (debugger)
- Universal Proteomics Standard mixture of proteins by sPRG of Association of Biomolecular Resource Facilities
