= UMC =

UMC may refer to:

== Organizations ==
=== Companies ===
- Ukrainian Mobile Communications, former name of Vodafone Ukraine, a mobile operator in Ukraine
- Union Metallic Cartridge Company, a subsidiary of Remington Arms
- United Microelectronics Corporation, Taiwanese semiconductor company, also its American subsidiary Unicorn Microelectronics Corporation
- Universal Media Corporation, a Sharp Corporation manufacturing subsidiary in Poland
- Urban Movie Channel, former name of Allblk, a streaming service for Black TV and film

=== Medical facilities ===
- United Medical Center, a hospital in Washington, DC, US
- Ljubljana University Medical Centre, a hospital in Slovenia
- University Medical Center, a hospital in partnership with Texas Tech University Health Sciences Center in Lubbock, Texas, US
- University Medical Center of Southern Nevada, in Las Vegas, Nevada, US
- University Medical Center (Tucson, Arizona), at the University of Arizona in Tucson, US
- University Memorial Center, at the University of Colorado Boulder, US

=== Universities ===
- University of Minnesota Crookston, US
- University of Mississippi Medical Center, US, formerly known as UMC
- Universidade de Mogi das Cruzes, Brazil

=== Other organizations ===
- United Methodist Church
- Uppsala Monitoring Centre (WHO Collaborating Centre for International Drug Monitoring)

== Music ==
- "U.M.C. (Upper Middle Class)", a song by Bob Seger from Seven
- The U.M.C.'s, a rap group
- Universal Mind Control, an album by rapper Common
- UMC, a record label owned by Universal Music Group

== Science and technology ==
- UMC (computer), a Polish computer using negabinary arithmetic
- Uniform Mechanical Code, for HVAC systems

== See also ==
- University Medical Center Utrecht (UMCU), in The Netherlands
- USB mass storage device class (USB MSC or UMS)
