= Universal Personal Telecommunications =

Universal personal telecommunications (UPT) was a special segment of the international telephone number space which had been set aside for universal personal telephone numbers. This service had been allocated country code +87810 and was completed by a 10-digit subscriber number which provided 10 billion unique numbers. The International Telecommunication Union (ITU) introduced this concept in 2001, referring to it as "global number portability" (not to be confused with number portability).

The delegation of UPT was requested by VisionNG Chairman Herwart Wermescher and was confirmed by Counsellor, SG2 of ITU-TSB Richard Hill on May 21, 2002.

The UPT number allocation was withdrawn in 2022.

== The UPT service ==
The UPT standards have been developed to allow a UPT number to be associated with any device on any network, anywhere in the world. An individual should be able to enter an access code to make or receive calls on any device and can be provisioned as a global mobile telephone number.

UPT allowed ad hoc sharing of physical devices and was intended to be independent of geography or network provider. From the +87810 numbering space, operators could offer their customers next generation services – voice, data, email, SMS, web and location-based services – using a single "number for life" that transcended national boundaries and traditional ways of thinking about communications.

Initially, UPT number blocks were allocated to VoIP, but as technology advanced, UPT was more and more seen as a numbering and addressing solution for Digital Identity and Internet of Things marketplace.

In February 2016, the ITU approved the assignment of a Mobile Country Code and Network Code associated to the UPT Country Code. This allowed for the provision of 10 billion unique IMSI's for the deployment of Global Mobile Services.

== UPT service profile ==
The UPT service profile was a record that contained all information related to a UPT user, which information is required to provide that user with UPT service such as subscriptions to basic and supplementing services and call-routing preferences. Each UPT service profile was associated with a single UPT number.

== UPT number ==
The UPT number was a global range delegated by the ITU and comprised 10 billion enum-enabled numbers with the prefix 87810 followed by a 10 digit subscriber number. It was in Tier 1 ENUM DNS registry under 0.1.8.7.8.e164.arpa

The UPT number uniquely identified a UPT user and was used to place a call to, or to forward a call to, that user. A user could have multiple UPT numbers (such as a business UPT number for business calls and a private UPT number for private calls). In the case of multiple numbers, each UPT number was considered, from a network vantage point, to identify a distinct UPT user, even if all such numbers identified the same person or entity.

== UPT environment ==
UPT environment was the environment within which the UPT service facilities were offered, consisting of combinations of global fixed, mobile and Next Generation networks.
