= UAR (disambiguation) =

UAR is the common abbreviation for the United Arab Republic, a state formed by the union of the republics of Egypt and Syria in 1958.

UAR or Uar may also refer to:

- Uar (tribe), a tribe in Central Asia and China
- Understanding Animal Research, a British advocacy group
- Unión Argentina de Rugby, the official governing body of rugby union in Argentina
- Union of African Railways, an organization of African railways
- United Artists Records, American record label
- United Artists Releasing, American film distribution joint venture which operated from 2017 to 2023
- Genetic code for stop codon
- ICAO designator for Aerostar Airlines, a Ukrainian airline
