= UK (disambiguation) =

UK most often refers to the United Kingdom, a country in Northwestern Europe.

UK, U.K., Uk, or uk may also refer to:

== Arts and media ==
- U.K. (band), a progressive rock supergroup
  - U.K. (album), by U.K.
- UK Records, a record label
- Ultrakill, a FPS game

== Educational institutions ==
- Charles University (Czech: Univerzita Karlova), in Prague, Czech Republic
- Comenius University (Slovak: Univerzita Komenského), in Bratislava, Slovakia
- Kongo University (French: l’Université Kongo), in the Democratic Republic of the Congo
- Universidad Argentina John F. Kennedy, Argentina
- University of Kara, Togo
- University of Kashmir, India
- University of Kentucky, United States
- University of Kragujevac, Serbia

== Language ==
- Uk (Cyrillic), a digraph in early Cyrillic alphabet
- uk, the Ukrainian language's ISO 639-1 code
- Universala Kongreso de Esperanto or World Congress of Esperanto

== Places ==
- Uttarakhand, a state of India
- Uttara Kannada district, Karnataka, India
- Uk, an urban-type settlement in Irkutsk Oblast, Russia

== Other uses ==
- .uk, the United Kingdom's top-level Internet domain
- UK (ICAO airport codes), airports in Ukraine
- Vistara (IATA airline code UK)

== See also ==
- United Kingdom (disambiguation)
