= Uz =

UZ, Uz, or uz may refer to:

== Businesses and organisations ==
=== Education ===
- Universidad de Zamboanga, Philippines
- University of Zaragoza, Aragón, Spain
- University of Zielona Góra, Zielona Góra, Poland
- University of Zimbabwe, Harare, Zimbabwe

=== Transport ===
- Ukrzaliznytsia (UZ), the national railway company of Ukraine, and country's railways ecosystem
- Buraq Air (IATA code: UZ), a Libyan airline

== People ==
- Uz, son of Aram, one of the sons of Aram, according to the Hebrew Bible (Genesis 10:23)
- Johann Uz (1720-1796), German anacreontic poet

== Places ==
=== Asia ===
- Uz, Iran
- Uzbekistan, a country (ISO 3166: UZ)
  - .uz, its top-level domain
- Land of Uz, in the Bible, the homeland of Job
- Uyts, Armenia (also called Uz)

=== Elsewhere ===
- Uz (river), Romania
- Uz, Hautes-Pyrénées, France
- Uz, Kentucky, United States

== Other uses ==
- Uz or Oghuz Turks, a group of loosely linked nomadic Turkic peoples
- Uzbek language (ISO 639-1 code "uz")
- Ústredňa Židov, a Judenrat in Slovakia during the Holocaust
- Toyota UZ engine

== See also ==
- Uzès, a commune of the Gard département in southern France
- Uzi, a family of Israeli submachine guns
