= USS =

USS, uss, or USs may refer to:

== Arts, media, and entertainment ==
- Ubiquitous Synergy Seeker, an alternative rock musical duo from Toronto, Canada
- Universal Studios Singapore, a theme park on Sentosa, Singapore

== Businesses and organizations ==
- Ukrainian Sich Riflemen (German: Ukrainische Sitschower Schützen; Ukrainian: Ukrainski sichovi striltsi), a Ukrainian unit within the Austro-Hungarian Army
- Union of Sovereign States, the planned successor to the Soviet Union
- Union Switch & Signal, a supplier of railroad switching equipment
- Union Syndicale Suisse, the Swiss Trade Union Confederation
- United Seamen's Service, a non-profit, federally chartered organization founded in 1942
- United State of Saurashtra, a separate, western State within the Union of India from 1948 until 1956
- United States Senate, the upper chamber of the United States Congress
- U.S. Steel Corporation
- USA Swimming, formerly United States Swimming, the national governing body for competitive swimming in the United States
- Universities Superannuation Scheme, a pension scheme in the United Kingdom
- United Peasant Party (Ujedinjena seljačka stranka), a political party in Serbia

== Computing ==
- Unformatted System Services, the mechanism within VTAM to format a session's logmode and application. An equivalent facility in TN3270 also specifies a logon screen.
- UNIX System Services, a component of z/OS that provides Unix compatibility
- Upload Speed Sense, a method of regulating a host's upload bandwidth in the eMule client

== Health care ==
- Ultrasound scan, a scientific and medical imaging technique (usually refers to medical ultrasound)
- Upshaw–Schulman syndrome, the recessively inherited form of thrombotic thrombocytopenic purpura
- Universal Spinal System, an implantable device (instrumentation) system for correcting scoliosis

== Schools ==
- University of Southern Somalia, a university in Baidoa, Somalia
- Uxbridge Secondary School, a secondary school in Uxbridge, Canada

== Other uses ==
- United States Ship, a ship prefix in the United States Navy (includes submarines)
- United States Standard, an older standard of screw thread
- In the fictional Star Trek universe, either United Space Ship or United Star Ship
