= Urd =

Urd may refer to:

- Urðr, one of a group of three Norns in Norse mythology
- Urd (Oh My Goddess!), character in the manga and anime series Oh My Goddess!
- Urd (Dungeons & Dragons), a creature which appeared in the 2nd edition Monstrous Manual
- Urd (bean), a type of bean (Vigna mungo)
- Urd (album), a 2012 album by the black metal band Borknagar
- Urd, a mountain and the highest point on Bear Island, Svalbard, Norway
- Urd (magazine)
- Urd Morlemoch - A dark elves citadel in Frostborn Omnibus by Jonathan Moeller
- Urdu (ISO 639-2 language code)

URD may refer to:

- Union for Republic and Democracy, a political party in Mali
- Union for Democratic Renewal, a political party in the Republic of the Congo
- Union for Democratic Renewal, a political party in Senegal
- Union for Renewal and Democracy, a political party in Chad
- Unión Republicana Democrática (Democratic Republican Union), a political party in Venezuela
- University of Religions and Denominations
- User requirements document
- Underground residential distribution, a type of electric power distribution
