= Universal Content Identifier =

South Korean content identification system

The Universal Content Identifier (UCI) (Korean: 국가디지털콘텐츠식별체계, lit. 'National Digital Content Identification System') is a South Korean identification system that identifies digital content through unique alphanumeric codes. It is based on Uniform Resource Name (URN) system.

== History ==
The development of UCI began in February 2003, and later in March, the Ministry of Information and Communication (now dissolved) confirmed the development of a national URN-based system. In October, the National Computerization Agency submitted a Request for Comment to the Internet Engineering Task Force for creating a namespace for UCI in the URN system. UCI was adopted by The Telecommunication Technology Association (한국정보통신기술협회) in June 2006. In November 2008, the Ministry of Culture, Sports and Tourism held a conference in the Plaza Hotel, Seoul to discuss the adoption of UCI into the private sector, as well as assigning a UCI to every digital content that is published on the internet.

In 2008, UCI merged with the Content Object Identifier (문화콘텐츠식별체계, lit. 'Cultural content identification system'), a separate system developed by the Ministry of Culture and Tourism (precursor to the current Ministry of Culture, Sports and Tourism). In January 2009 or 2008 (sources conflict), the UCI was officially designated as a Korean Information and Communication Standard (한국정보통신표준).

By the end of 2014, there were 36 registrar organizations, with around 173,500,000 registered works.

== Features ==
UCI is used for all types of digital media, including music, video, and phone applications. In addition to uniquely identifying pieces of digital media, UCI provides metadata such as the author and title. UCI can be used for copyright management since it identifies the source material to any device that the media is shared.

UCI is based on the Uniform Resource Name (URN) system, which different from URLs that they specify a unique content rather than a location.

The UCI code is composed of three parts in the form "prefix code - entity code - qualifier code". The prefix code (접두코드) identifies the registration authority and the registrant, and the entity code (개체코드) identifies the resource itself. Finally, the qualifier code (한정코드) identifies the different forms of the same piece of media.

Metadata elements in UCI
English	Korean	Definition
UCI	UCI	Unique resource identifier assigned by the issuing agency
identifier	기존식별자	Identifiers other than UCI (e.g. ISBN)
title	제목	name of the resource
type	유형	given type of the resource
mode	표현형태	primary sensory or cognitive form of the resource
format	파일형식	Data representation format of the resource
contribution	기여	Encapsulates roles and responsibilities
contributor	기여자	name of the entity responsible for the resource's content – A sub-element of contribution
contributorRole	기여자역할	The role or responsibility of the contributor – A sub-element of contribution

Two studies independently proposed the integration of Integrated Copyright Number (ICN), which is a separate national system developed by Ministry of Culture, Sports and Tourism, with UCI in order to streamline copyright management and distribution.

== Management ==
The Korea Copyright Commission is the central authority of UCI. The Commission has picked several companies and organizations to be registrars for UCI, such as Imazins (이매진스) and Media Scope (미디어스코프). Media Scope has expanded UCI adoption across various karaoke companies. In 2021, Korea Literature, Academic works and Art Copyright Association was assigned with additional roles, and established the "Literary and Artistic Works UCI Issuance System". By October 2023, the Association reported assigning UCI to 510,000 works.
