= Decapitation =

Complete separation of the head from the body

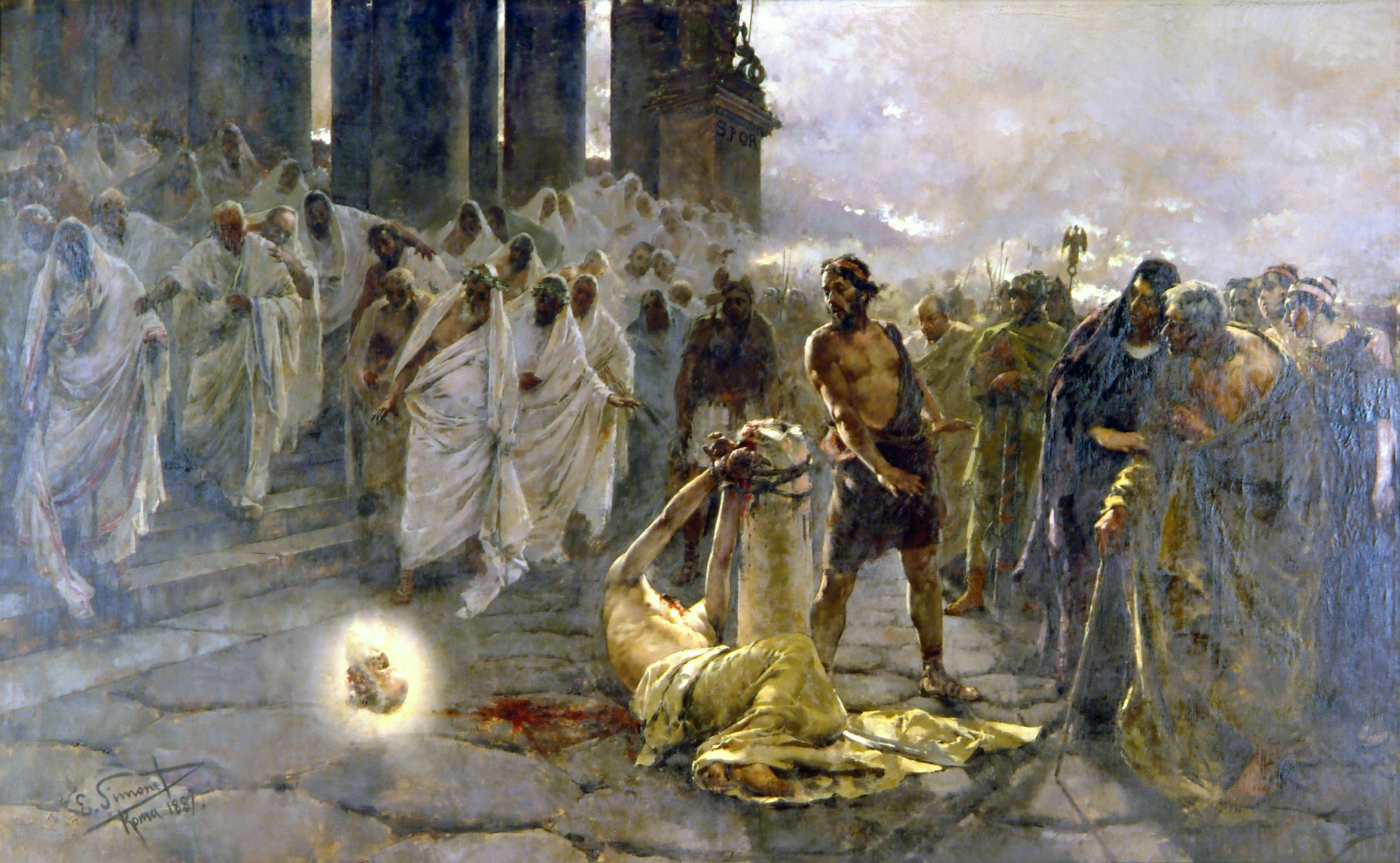
The Beheading of Saint Paul. Painting by Enrique Simonet in 1887, Málaga Cathedral

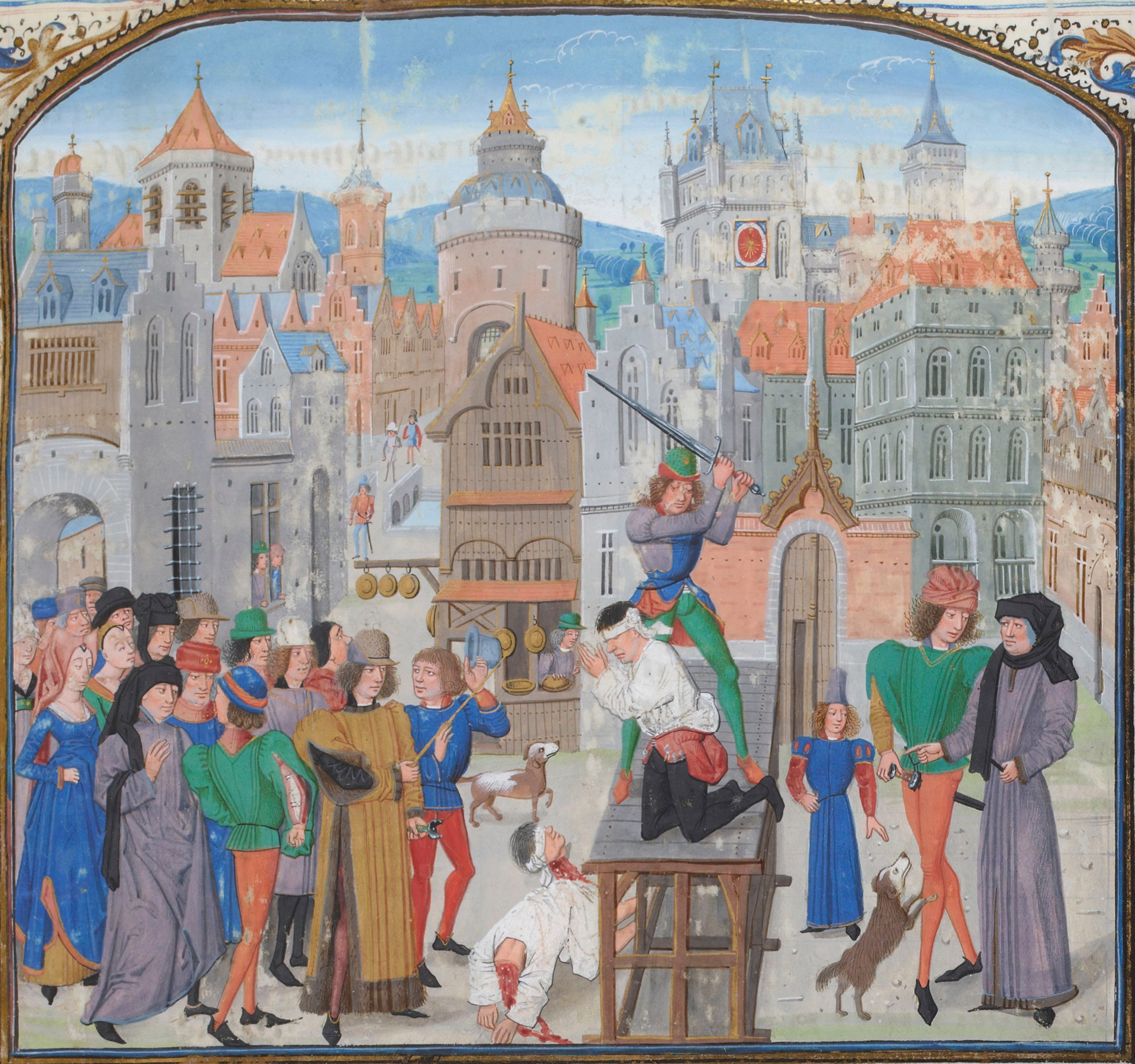
Beheadings in an illumination from Froissart's Chronicles from the beginning of the 14th century – the execution of Guillaume Sans and his secretary in Bordeaux on the orders of Thomas Felton

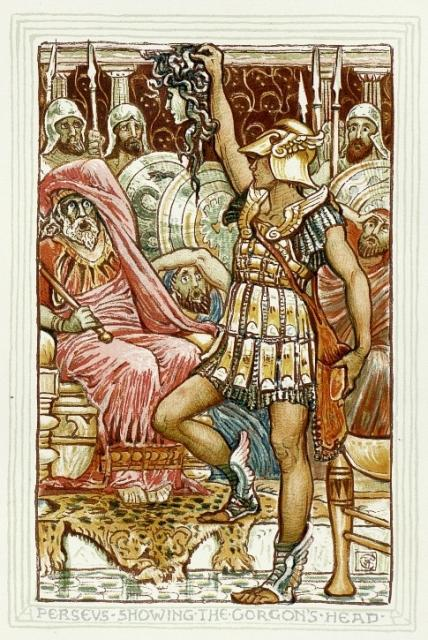
Perseus using the severed head of Medusa to turn King Polydectes to stone

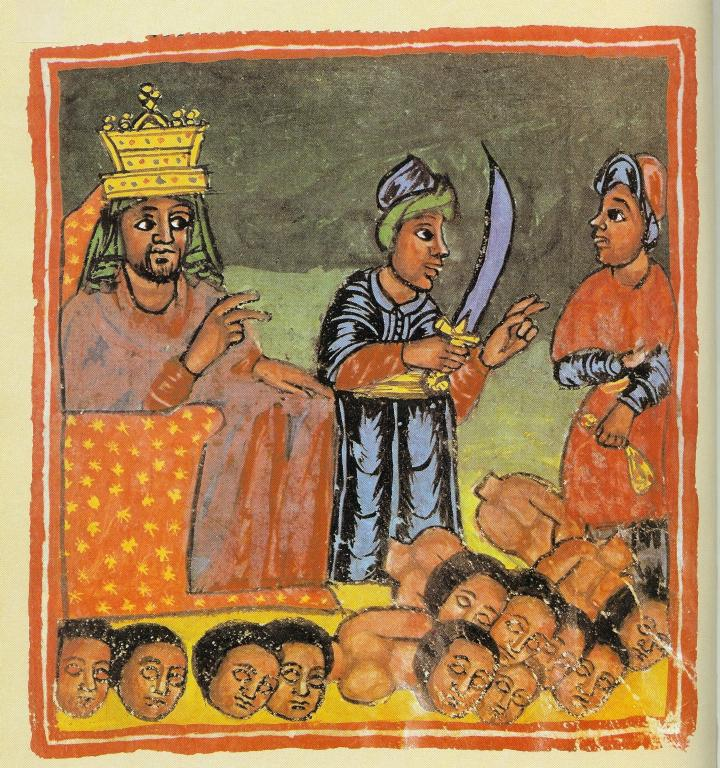
Depiction of an Ethiopian emperor executing people, 18th century

Decapitation is the total separation of the head from the body. This is invariably fatal to humans and all vertebrate animals, since it deprives the brain of oxygenated blood by way of severing the jugular vein and common carotid artery, while all other organs are deprived of the involuntary functions that are needed for the body to function. The term beheading refers to the act of deliberately decapitating a person, either as a means of murder or as an execution; it may be performed with an axe, sword, and knife, or by mechanical means such as a guillotine. An executioner who carries out executions by beheading is sometimes called a headsman. Accidental decapitation can be the result of an explosion, a car or industrial accident, improperly administered execution by hanging or other violent injury. The national laws of Saudi Arabia and Yemen permit beheading. Under Sharia, which exclusively applies to Muslims, beheading is also a legal punishment in Zamfara State, Nigeria. Cases of decapitation by suicidal hanging, suicide by train decapitation and by guillotine have been documented.

Less commonly, decapitation can also refer to the removal of the head from a body that is already dead. This might be done to take the head as a trophy, as a secondary stage of an execution by hanging, for public display, to make the deceased more difficult to identify, for cryonics, or for other, more esoteric reasons.

== Etymology ==
The word decapitation derives from the Late Latin word decapitare. The meaning of the word decapitare can be discerned from its morphemes de- (down, from) + capit- (head). The past participle of decapitare is decapitatus which was used to create decapitatio, the noun form of decapitatus, in Medieval Latin, whence the French word décapitation was produced.

== History ==
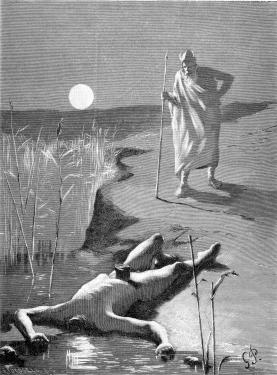
Odin finding Mímir's beheaded body – an episode of Norse mythology

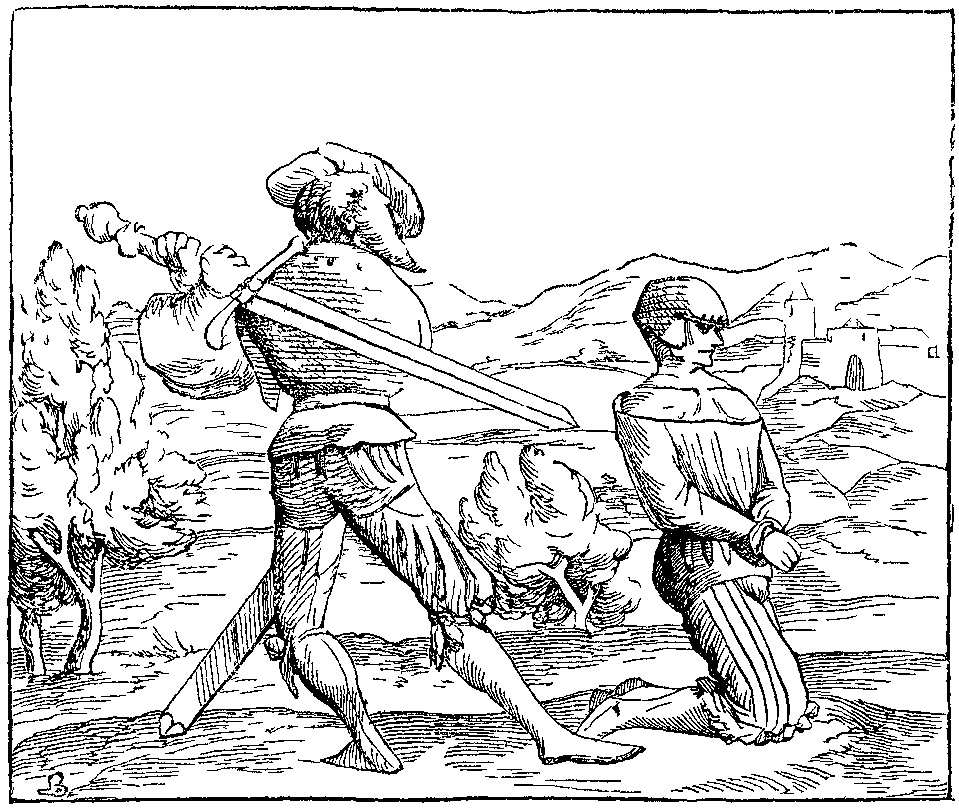
Beheading – facsimile of a miniature on wood in the Cosmographia of Sebastian Münster (1488–1552), Basel, Switzerland, 1552

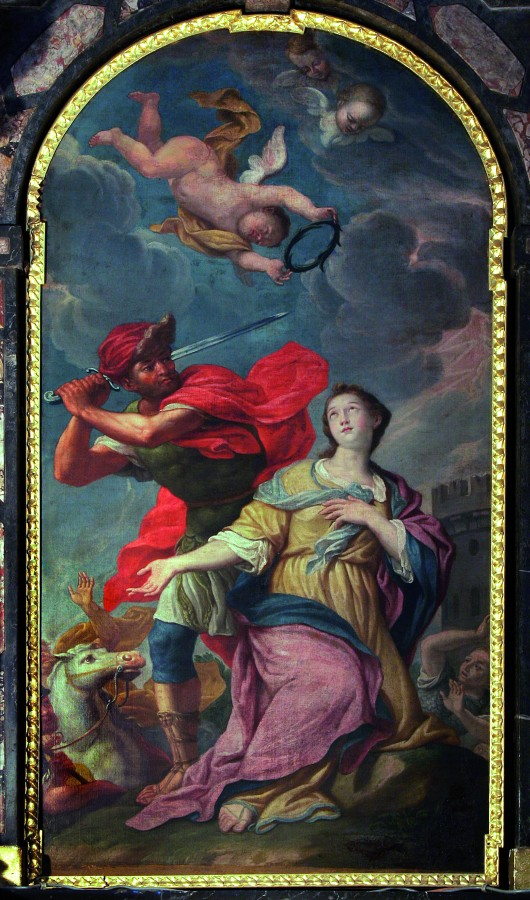
"The beheading of St. Barbara" by Giulio Quaglio the Younger (1721–1723)

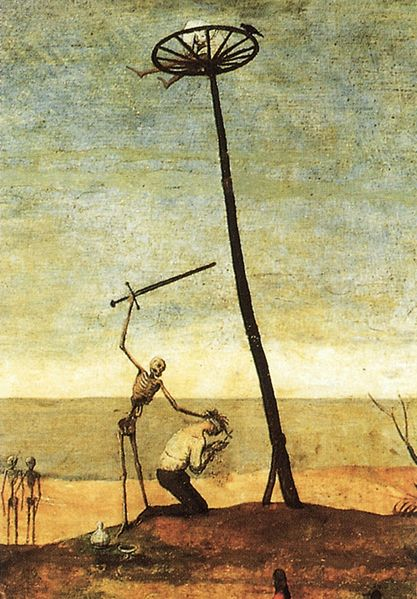
Depiction of a public execution in Brueghel's The Triumph of Death, 1562–1563

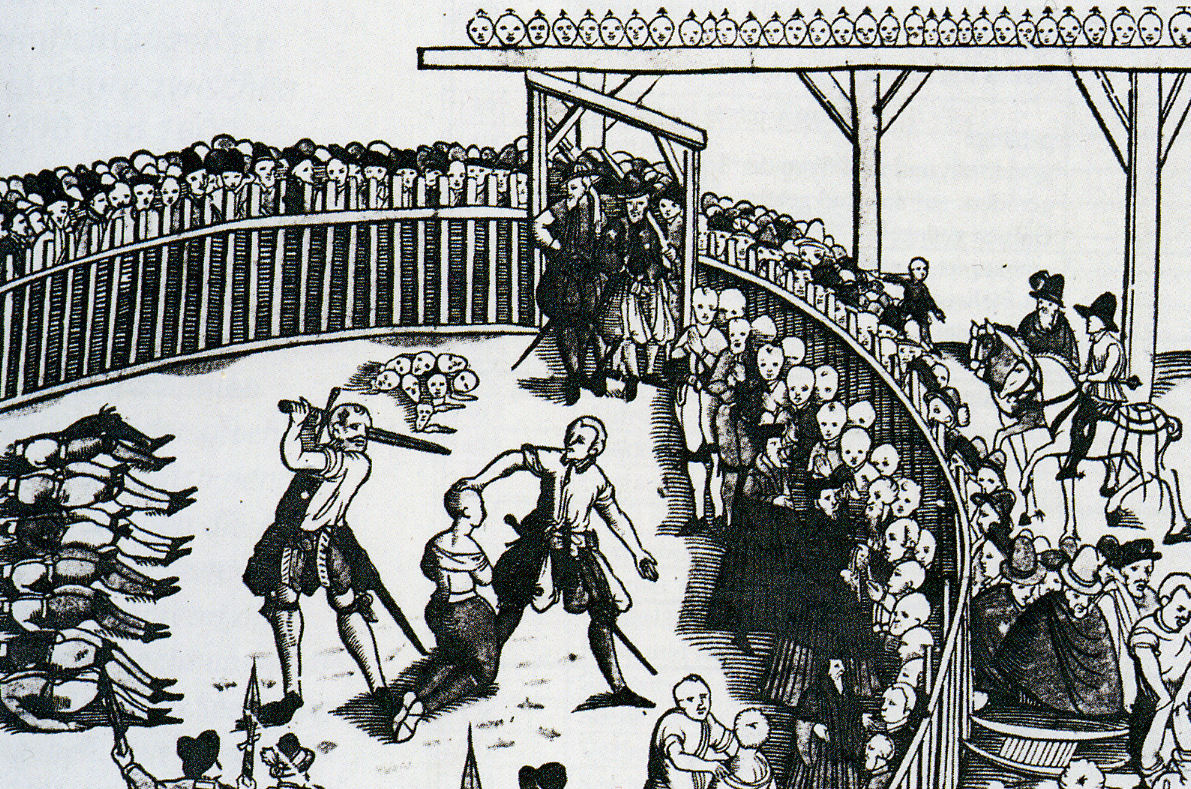
Depiction of the public execution of pirates (namely Klein Henszlein and his crew) in Hamburg, Germany, 10 September 1573

Humans have practiced capital punishment by beheading for millennia. The Narmer Palette (c. 3000 BCE) shows the first known depiction of decapitated corpses. The terms "capital offence", "capital crime", "capital punishment", derive from the Latin caput, "head", referring to the punishment for serious offences involving the forfeiture of the head; i.e. death by beheading.

Some cultures, such as ancient Rome and Greece, regarded decapitation as the most honorable form of death. In the Middle Ages, many European nations continued to reserve the method only for nobles and royalty. In France, the French Revolution made it the only legal method of execution for all criminals regardless of class, one of the period's many symbolic changes.

Others have regarded beheading as dishonorable and contemptuous, such as the Japanese troops who beheaded prisoners during World War II. In recent times, it has become associated with terrorism.

If a headsman's ax or sword is sharp and his aim is precise, decapitation is quick and thought to be a relatively painless form of death. If the instrument is blunt or the executioner is clumsy, repeated strokes might be required to sever the head, resulting in a prolonged and more painful death. Robert Devereux, 2nd Earl of Essex, and Mary, Queen of Scots, required three strikes at their respective executions. The same could be said for the execution of Johann Friedrich Struensee, favorite of the Danish queen Caroline Matilda of Great Britain. Margaret Pole, 8th Countess of Salisbury, is said to have required up to 10 strokes before decapitation was achieved. This particular story may, however, be apocryphal, as highly divergent accounts exist. Historian and philosopher David Hume, for example, relates the following about her death:

She refused to lay her head on the block, or submit to a sentence where she had received no trial. She told the executioner, that if he would have her head, he must win it the best way he could: and thus, shaking her venerable grey locks, she ran about the scaffold; and the executioner followed her with his axe, aiming many fruitless blows at her neck before he was able to give the fatal stroke.

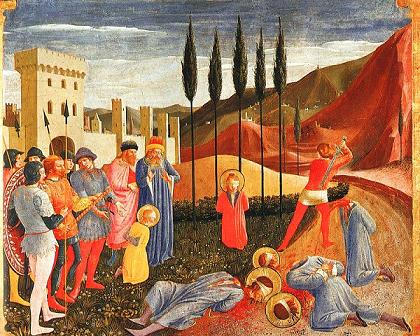
The Beheading of Cosmas and Damian, by Fra Angelico

== Physiological aspects ==
=== Physiology of death by decapitation ===
Decapitation is quickly fatal to humans and most animals. Unconsciousness occurs within seconds without circulating oxygenated blood (brain ischemia). Cell death and irreversible brain damage occur after 3–6 minutes with no oxygen, due to excitotoxicity. Some anecdotes suggest more extended persistence of human consciousness after decapitation, but most doctors consider this unlikely and consider such accounts to be misapprehensions of reflexive twitching rather than deliberate movement, since deprivation of oxygen must cause nearly immediate coma and death ("[Consciousness is] probably lost within 2–3 seconds, due to a rapid fall of intracranial perfusion of blood").

A laboratory study testing for humane methods of euthanasia in awake animals used EEG monitoring to measure the time duration following decapitation for rats to become fully unconscious, unable to perceive distress and pain. It was estimated that this point was reached within 3–4 seconds, correlating closely with results found in other studies on rodents (2.7 seconds, and 3–6 seconds). The same study also suggested that the massive wave which can be recorded by EEG monitoring approximately one minute after decapitation ultimately reflects brain death. Other studies indicate that electrical activity in the brain has been demonstrated to persist for 13 to 14 seconds following decapitation (although it is disputed as to whether such activity implies that pain is perceived), and a 2010 study reported that decapitation of rats generated responses in EEG indices over a period of 10 seconds that have been linked to nociception across a number of different species of animals, including rats.

Some animals (such as cockroaches) can survive decapitation and die not because of the loss of the head directly, but rather because of starvation. A number of other animals, including snakes, and turtles, have also been known to survive for some time after being decapitated, as they have slower metabolisms and their nervous systems can continue to function at some capacity for a limited time even after connection to the brain is lost, responding to any nearby stimulus. In addition, the bodies of chickens and turtles may continue to move temporarily after decapitation.

Although head transplantation by the reattachment of blood vessels has seen some very limited success in animals, a fully functional reattachment of a severed human head (including repair of the spinal cord, muscles, and other critically important tissues) has not yet been achieved.

== Technology ==
=== Guillotine ===
Aristocratic heads on pikes – a cartoon from the French Revolution

Early versions of the guillotine included the Halifax Gibbet, which was used in Halifax, England, from 1286 until the 17th century, and the "Maiden", employed in Edinburgh from the 16th to the 18th centuries.

The modern form of the guillotine was invented shortly before the French Revolution with the aim of creating a quick and painless method of execution requiring little skill on the part of the operator. Decapitation by guillotine became a common mechanically assisted form of execution.

The French observed a strict code of etiquette surrounding such executions. For example, a man named Legros, one of the assistants at the execution of Charlotte Corday, was imprisoned for three months and dismissed for slapping the face of the victim after the blade had fallen in order to see whether any flicker of life remained. The guillotine was used in France during the French Revolution and remained the normal judicial method in both peacetime and wartime into the 1970s, although the firing squad was used in certain cases. France abolished the death penalty in 1981.

The guillotine was also used in Algeria before the French relinquished control of it, as shown in Gillo Pontecorvo's film The Battle of Algiers.

=== Fallbeil ===
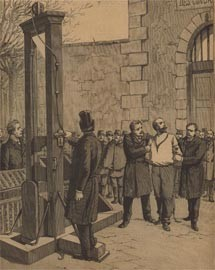
French anarchist Auguste Vaillant just before being guillotined in 1894

Many German states had used a guillotine-like device known as a Fallbeil ("falling ax") since the 17th and 18th centuries, and decapitation by guillotine was the usual means of execution in Germany until the abolition of the death penalty in West Germany in 1949. It was last used in communist East Germany in 1966.

In Nazi Germany, the Fallbeil was reserved for common criminals and people convicted of political crimes, including treason. Members of the White Rose resistance movement, a group of students in Munich that included siblings Sophie and Hans Scholl, were executed by decapitation.

Contrary to popular myth, executions were generally not conducted face-up, and chief executioner Johann Reichhart was insistent on maintaining "professional" protocol throughout the era, having administered the death penalty during the earlier Weimar Republic. Nonetheless, it is estimated that some 16,500 persons were guillotined in Germany and Austria between 1933 and 1945, a number that includes resistance fighters both within Germany itself and in countries occupied by Nazi forces. As these resistance fighters were not part of any regular army, they were considered common criminals and were in many cases transported to Germany for execution. Decapitation was considered a "dishonorable" death, in contrast to execution by firing squad.

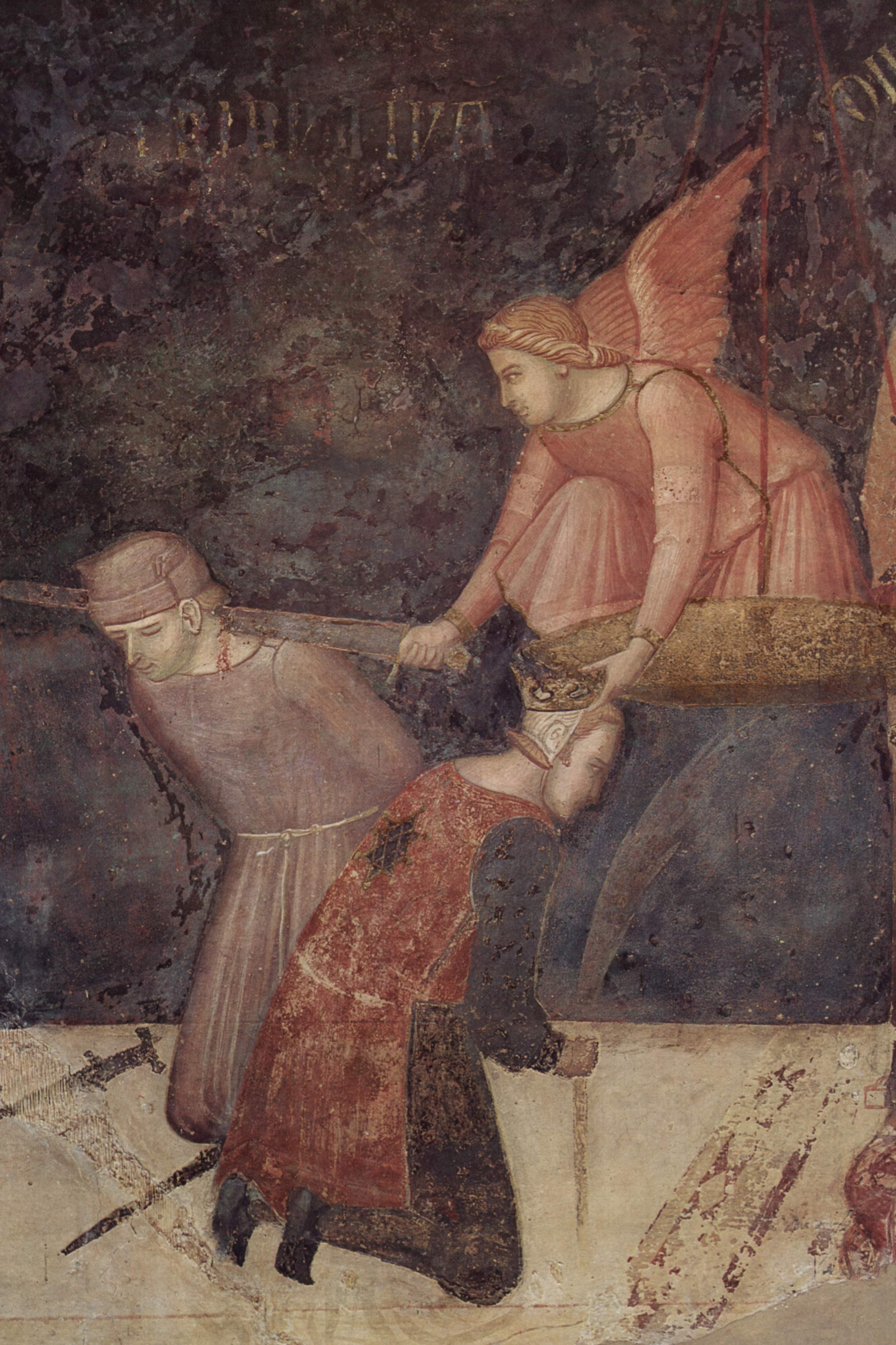
A fresco by Ambrogio Lorenzetti

== Historical practices by nation ==
=== Africa ===
==== Congo ====
In the Democratic Republic of Congo, the conflict and ethnic massacre between local army and Kamuina Nsapu rebels has caused several deaths and atrocities such as rape and mutilation. One of them is decapitation, both a fearsome way to intimidate victims as well as an act that may include ritualistic elements. According to a UN report from Congolese refugees, they believed the Bana Mura and Kamuina Nsapu militias have "magical powers" as a result of drinking the blood of decapitated victims, making them invincible.

Besides the massive decapitations (like the beheading of 40 members of the State Police), a globally notorious case happened in March 2017 to Swedish politician Zaida Catalán and American UN expert Michael Sharp, who were kidnapped and executed during a mission near the village of Ngombe in Kasaï Province. The UN was reportedly horrified when video footage of the executions surfaced in April that same year, where some grisly details led to assume ritual components of the beheading: the perpetrators first cut the hair of both victims, and then one of them beheaded Catalán only, because it would "increase his power", which may be linked to the fact that Congolese militias are particularly brutal in their acts of violence toward women and children.

In the trial that followed investigations after the bodies were discovered, and according to a testimony of a primary school teacher from Bunkonde, near the village of Moyo Musuila where the executions took place, he witnessed a teenage militant carrying the young woman's head, but despite the efforts of the investigation, the head was never found. According to a report published on 29 May 2019, the Monusco peacekeeping military mission led by Colonel Luis Mangini, in the search for the missing remains, arrived to a ritual place in Moyo Musila where "parts of bodies, hands and heads" were cut and used for rituals, where they lost track of the victim's head.

=== Asia ===
==== Azerbaijan ====
During the 2016 Armenian–Azerbaijani clashes, Yazidi-Armenian serviceman Kyaram Sloyan was decapitated by Azerbaijani servicemen.

Several reports of decapitation, along with other types of mutilation of Armenian POWs by Azerbaijani soldiers, emerged in 2020 during the Second Nagorno-Karabakh War.

==== China ====
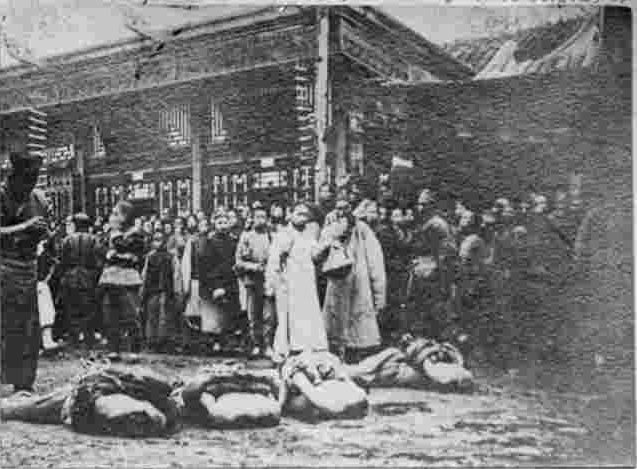
Ranked beheaded bodies on the ground, in Caishikou, Beijing, China, 1905

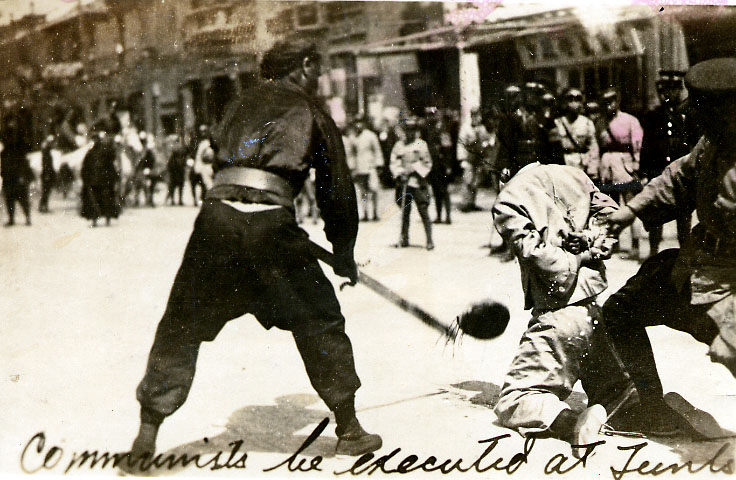
Public beheading of a communist during the Shanghai massacre, 1927

In traditional China, decapitation was considered a more severe form of punishment than strangulation, although strangulation caused more prolonged suffering. This was because in Confucian tradition, a person's body was a gift from their parents, and so it was therefore disrespectful to their ancestors to return their bodies to the grave dismembered. The Chinese, however, had other punishments, such as dismembering the body into multiple pieces (similar to the English quartering). In addition, there was also a practice of cutting the body at the waist, which was a common method of execution before being abolished in the early Qing dynasty due to the lingering death it caused. In some tales, people did not die immediately after decapitation.

==== India ====
The British officer John Masters recorded in his autobiography that Pathans in British India during the Anglo-Afghan Wars would behead enemy soldiers who were captured, such as British and Sikh soldiers.

The Execution of Sambhaji was a significant event in 17th-century Deccan India, where the second Maratha King was put to death by order of the Mughal emperor Aurangzeb. The conflicts between the Mughals and the Deccan Sultanates, which resulted in the downfall of the Sultanates, paved the way for tensions between the Marathas and the Mughals. Aurangzeb was drawn to Southern India due to the vanquished rebel Akbar fleeing to the Maratha monarch, Sambhaji. The Maratha King was then captured by the Mughal general Muqarrab Khan. Sambhaji and his minister Kavi Kalash were then taken to Tulapur, where they were tortured to death.

==== Japan ====
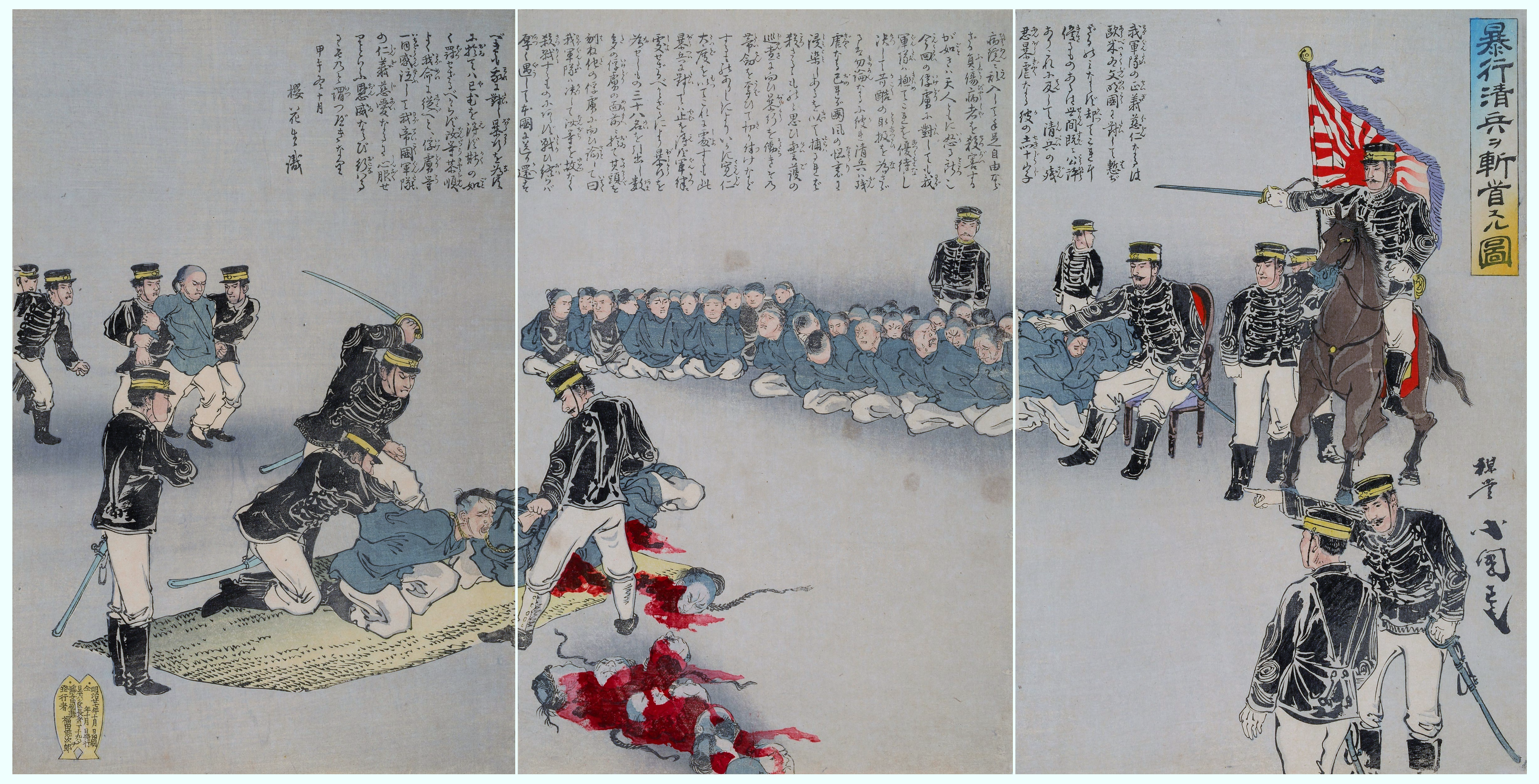
Japanese illustration depicting the beheading of Chinese captives. First Sino-Japanese War

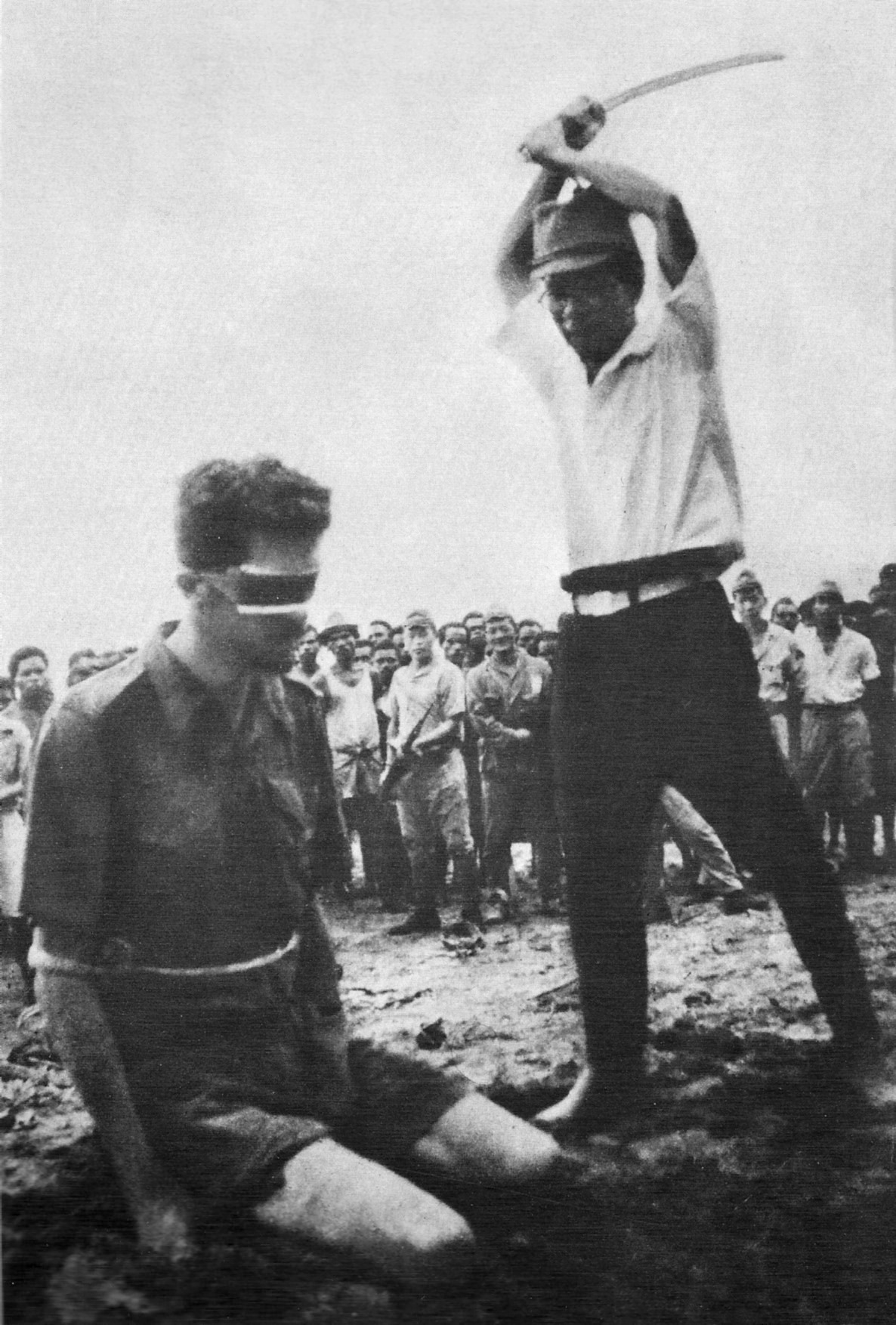
Sgt. Leonard Siffleet, an Australian POW captured in New Guinea, about to be beheaded by a Japanese soldier with a shin guntō sword, 1943

In Japan, decapitation was a common punishment, sometimes for minor offences. Samurai were often allowed to decapitate soldiers who had fled from battle, as it was considered cowardly. Decapitation was historically performed as the second step in seppuku (ritual suicide by disembowelment). After the victim had sliced his own abdomen open, another warrior would strike his head off from behind with a katana to hasten death and to reduce the suffering. The blow was expected to be precise enough to leave intact a small strip of skin at the front of the neck—to spare invited and honored guests the indelicacy of witnessing a severed head rolling about, or towards them; such an occurrence would have been considered inelegant and in bad taste. The sword was expected to be used upon the slightest sign that the practitioner might yield to pain and cry out—avoiding dishonor to him and to all partaking in the privilege of observing an honorable demise. As skill was involved, only the most trusted warrior was honored by taking part. In the late Sengoku period, decapitation was performed as soon as the person chosen to carry out seppuku had made the slightest wound to his abdomen.

Decapitation (without seppuku) was also considered a very severe and degrading form of punishment. One of the most brutal decapitations was that of Sugitani Zenjubō (杉谷善住坊), who attempted to assassinate Oda Nobunaga, a prominent daimyō, in 1570. After being caught, Zenjubō was buried alive in the ground with only his head out, and the head was slowly sawn off with a bamboo saw by passers-by for several days (punishment by sawing; nokogiribiki (鋸挽き). These unusual punishments were abolished in the early Meiji era. A similar scene is described in the last page of James Clavell's novel Shōgun.

==== Korea ====
Historically, decapitation had been the most common method of execution in Korea, until it was replaced by hanging in 1896. Professional executioners were called mangnani (망나니) and they were volunteered from death rows.

==== Pacific ====
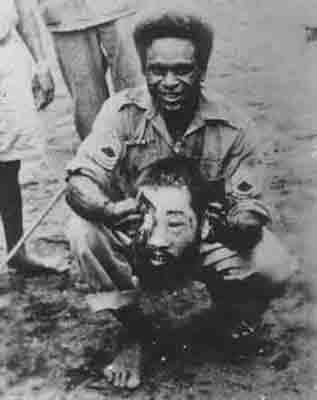
Jacob C. Vouza holding the severed head of a Japanese soldier in Guadalcanal, December 1942.

Marlin Groft saw Jacob C. Vouza carried two Japanese heads.

==== Philippines ====
During World War II, Muslim Moro people counter-insurgents at the Jolo Philippines island during the Battle of Sulu (スールー諸島の戦い) killed an estimated 97% of the stationed Japanese forces using guerilla tactics and beheading them with machetes. Japanese survivors reported being slaughtered, beheaded, and barely putting up a fight with "pathetic" deaths. Worsening the issue was the lack of supplies or support from the Japanese military. Japanese survivors, armed with mountain artillery, reported being "overwhelmed like children" by Moro weaponry, which included rifles, kris daggers, tabar axes, bolo and barong knives, campilan swords, spears, and bows. Japanese were regularly beheaded in ambushes by Muslim guerillas with swords.

American soldier Louis Armentaro in Mindanao said he was disgusted when Moros presented him with a bleeding severed Japanese head to trade, and when he later saw Moros pursuing two Japanese to a river, one of the Japanese committed suicide with a grenade and the other one jumped in the river. Armentaro lied and said he probably drowned despite seeing air bubbles since he didn't want the Moros to behead the Japanese. USS SC-1267 navy chief engineer Arthur Smith saw Muslim Moros and Christians in Sulu and said they did not like each other. American marine Anthony Costa said he was scared of Muslim Moros when he visited the southern Philippines before World War II. He said only a .45 bullet would halt them.

American officer Lieutenant Commander William Ross Brown had a photograph showing two severed Japanese heads and another photograph of a severed Japanese head being held in the Philippines.

==== Thailand ====
Decapitation was the main method of execution in Thailand, until it was replaced by shooting in 1934.

==== Vietnam ====
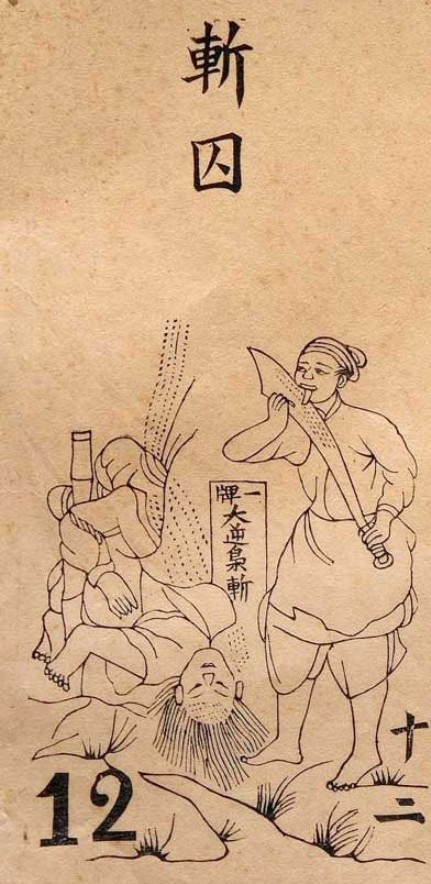
Illustration of the beheading of a prisoner of the Nguyễn dynasty in the book Mechanics and Crafts of the People of Annam

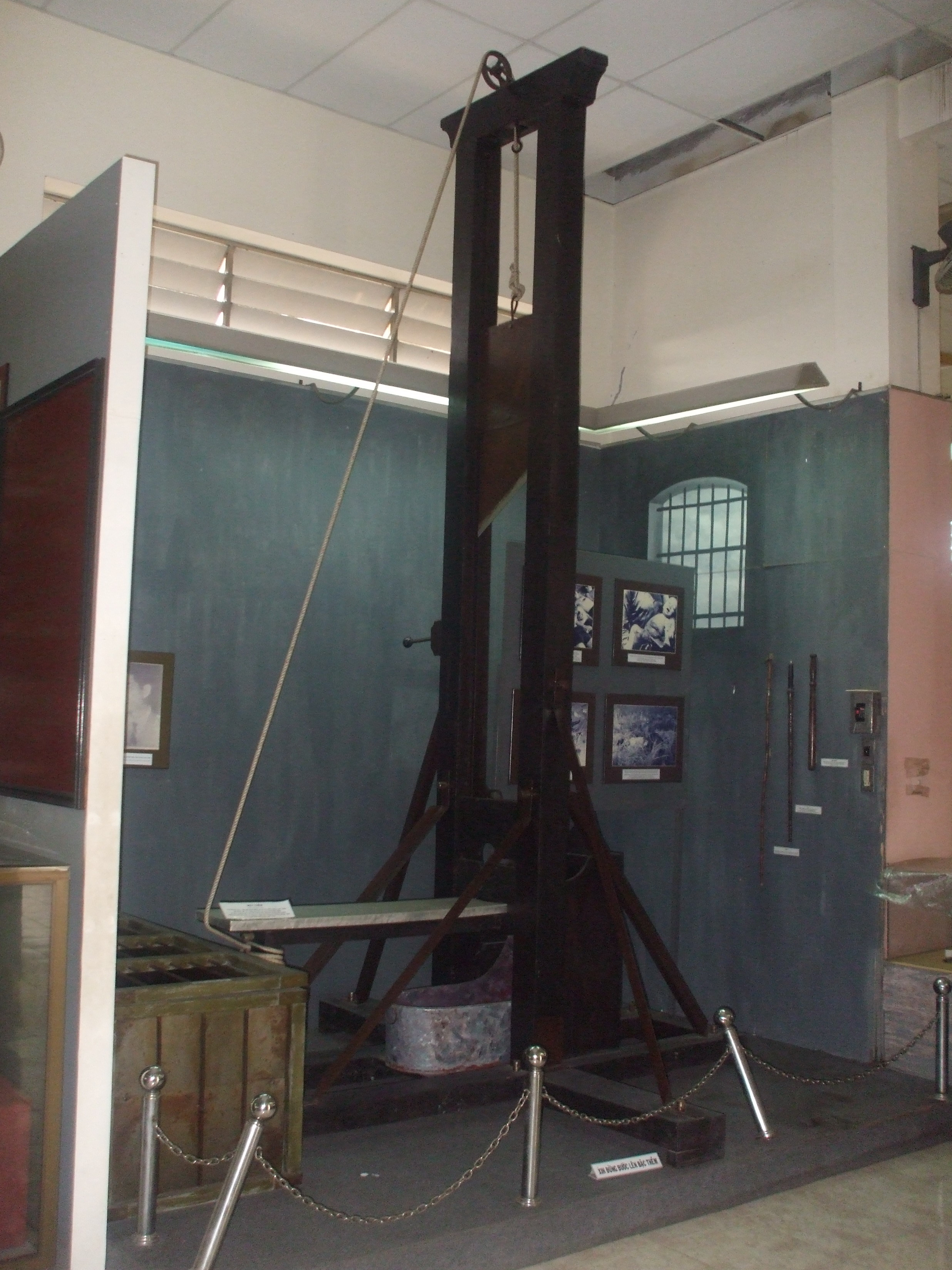
Guillotine under Ngô Đình Diệm, South Vietnam

Execution by beheading was one of the most common forms of execution in Vietnam under the feudal system. This form of execution still existed in the South Vietnam regime until 1962.

=== Europe ===
==== Bosnia and Herzegovina ====
During the war in Bosnia and Herzegovina (1992–1995) there were a number of ritual beheadings of Serbs and Croats who were taken as prisoners of war by mujahideen members of the Bosnian Army. At least one case is documented and proven in court by the ICTY where mujahedin, members of 3rd Corps of Army BiH, beheaded Bosnian Serb Dragan Popović.

==== Britain ====
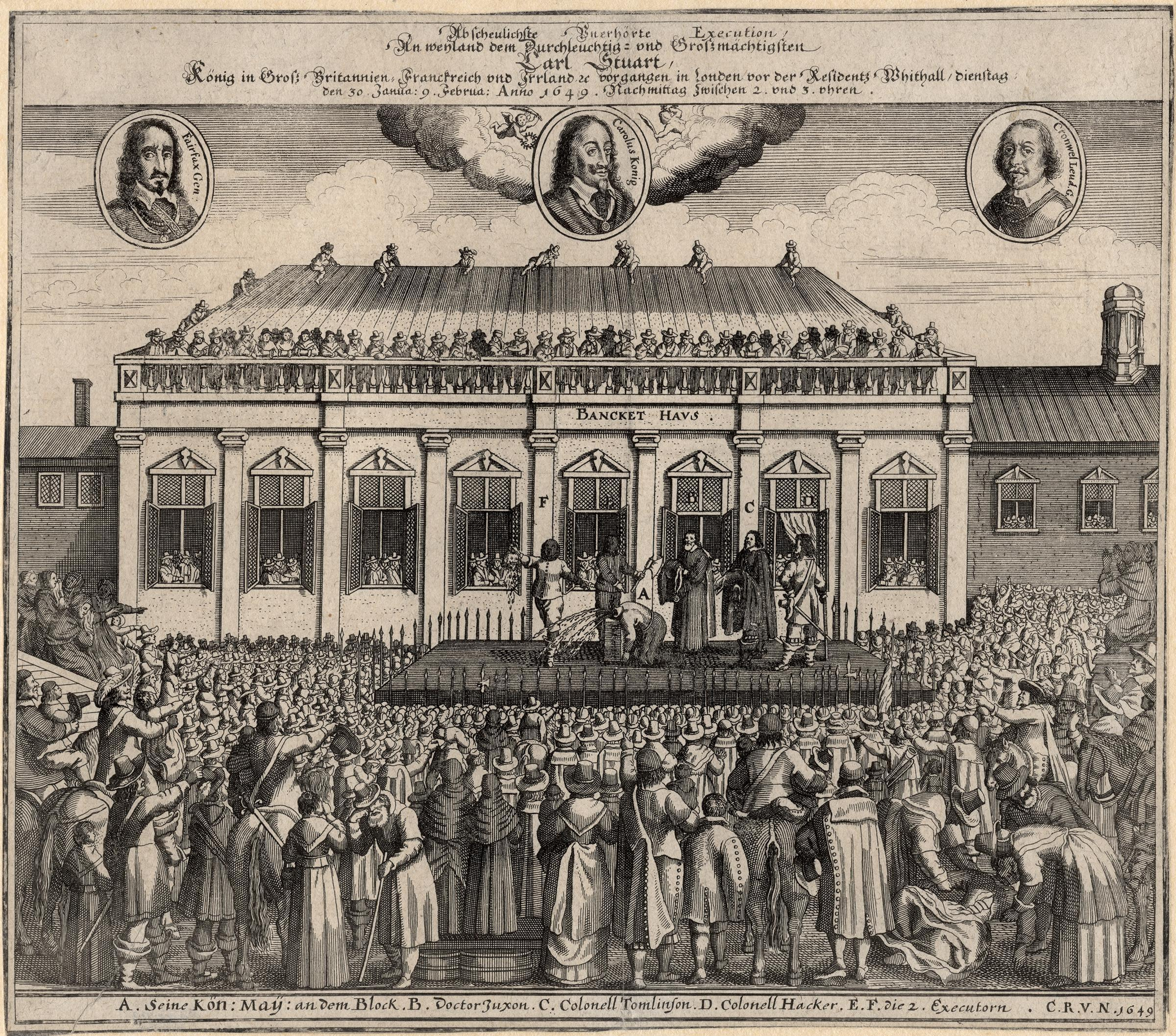
A contemporary German print depicting the beheading of King Charles I

In British history, beheading was typically used for noblemen, while commoners would be hanged; eventually, hanging was adopted as the standard means of non-military executions. The last actual execution by beheading was of Simon Fraser, 11th Lord Lovat on 9 April 1747, while a number of convicts were beheaded posthumously up to the early 19th century. (Typically traitors were sentenced to be hanged, drawn and quartered, a method which had already been discontinued.) Beheading was degraded to a secondary means of execution, including for treason, with the abolition of drawing and quartering in 1870; it was finally abolished by the Statute Law (Repeals) Act 1973. One of the most notable executions by decapitation in Britain was that of King Charles I of England, who was beheaded outside the Banqueting House in Whitehall in 1649, after being captured by parliamentarians during the English Civil War and tried for treason.

In England, a bearded axe was used for beheading, with the blade's edge extending downwards from the tip of the shaft.

==== Celts ====
The Celts of western Europe long pursued a "cult of the severed head", as evidenced by both Classical literary descriptions and archaeological contexts. This cult played a central role in their temples and religious practices and earned them a reputation as head hunters among the Mediterranean peoples. Diodorus Siculus, in his 1st-century Historical Library (5.29.4) wrote the following about Celtic head-hunting:

They cut off the heads of enemies slain in battle and attach them to the necks of their horses. The blood-stained spoils they hand over to their attendants and striking up a paean and singing a song of victory; and they nail up these first fruits upon their houses, just as do those who lay low wild animals in certain kinds of hunting. They embalm in cedar oil the heads of the most distinguished enemies, and preserve them carefully in a chest, and display them with pride to strangers, saying that for this head one of their ancestors, or his father, or the man himself, refused the offer of a large sum of money. They say that some of them boast that they refused the weight of the head in gold.

Both the Greeks and Romans found the Celtic decapitation practices shocking and the latter put an end to them when Celtic regions came under their control.

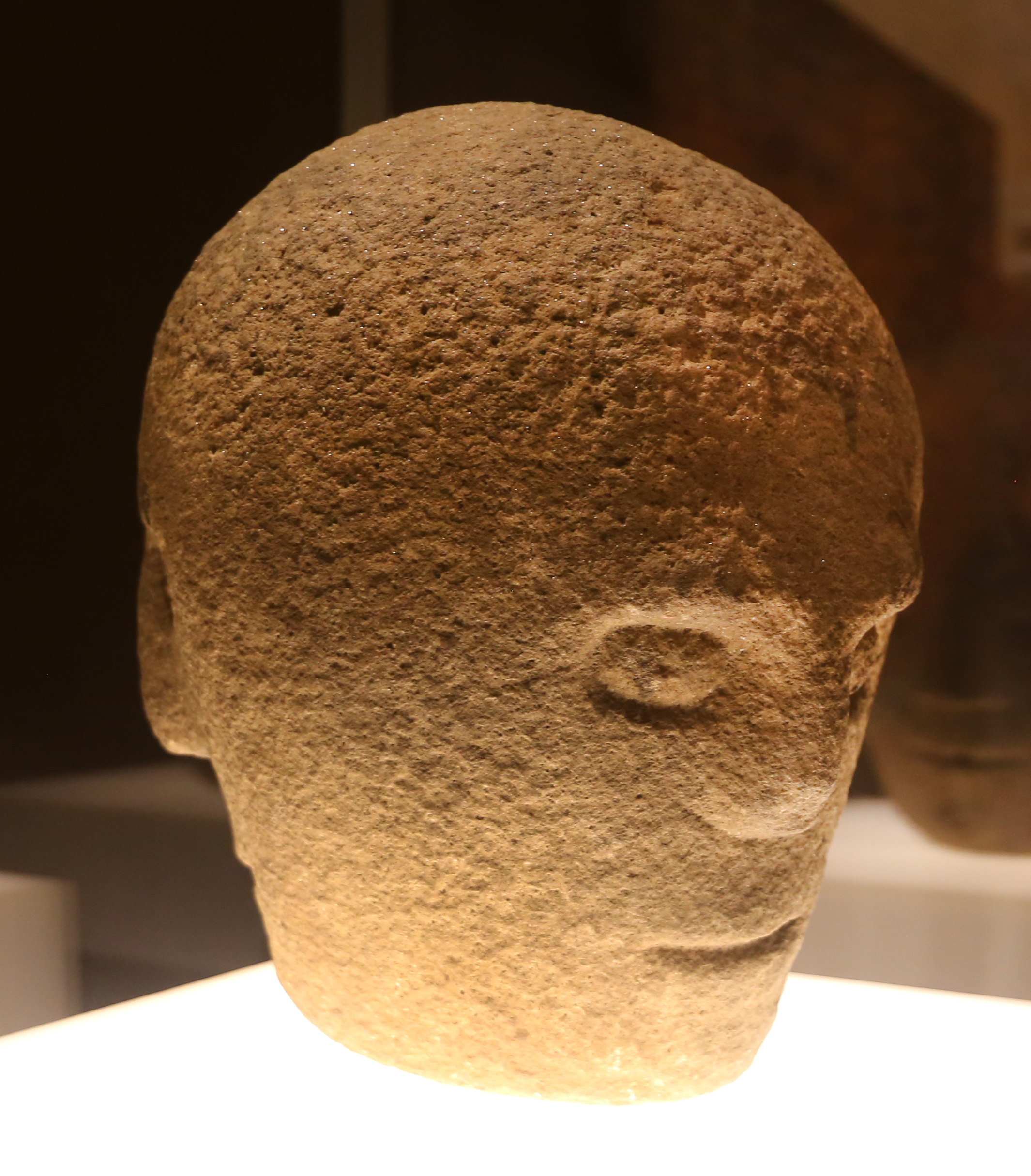
The Corleck Head, Irish, 1st or 2nd century AD

According to Paul Jacobsthal, "Amongst the Celts the human head was venerated above all else, since the head was to the Celt the soul, centre of the emotions as well as of life itself, a symbol of divinity and of the powers of the other-world." Arguments for a Celtic cult of the severed head include the many sculptured representations of severed heads in La Tène carvings, and the surviving Celtic mythology, which is full of stories of the severed heads of heroes and the saints who carry their own severed heads, right down to Sir Gawain and the Green Knight, where the Green Knight picks up his own severed head after Gawain has struck it off in a beheading game, just as Saint Denis carried his head to the top of Montmartre.

A further example of this regeneration after beheading lies in the tales of Connemara's Saint Féchín, who after being beheaded by Vikings carried his head to the Holy Well on Omey Island and on dipping it into the well placed it back upon his neck and was restored to full health.

==== Classical antiquity ====
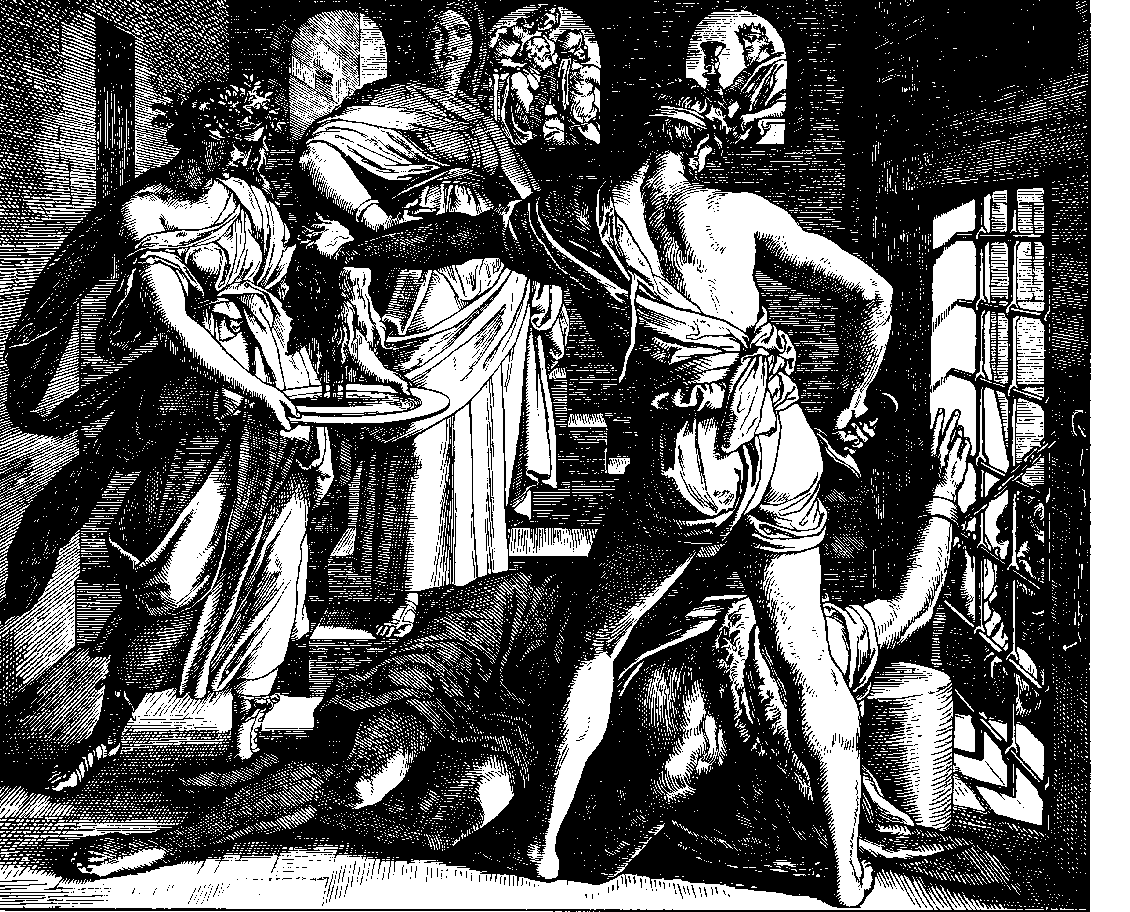
Beheading of John the Baptist by Julius Schnorr von Karolsfeld, 1860

Pothinus matched Mark Antony in crime:
They slew the noblest Romans of their time.
The helpless victims they decapitated,
An act of infamy with shame related.
One head was Pompey's, who brought triumphs home,
The other Cicero's, the voice of Rome.

— Martial, Epigram I:60 (Trans. by Garry Wills)

The ancient Greeks and Romans regarded decapitation as a comparatively honorable form of execution for criminals. The traditional procedure, however, included first being tied to a stake and whipped with rods. Axes were used by the Romans, and later swords, which were considered a more honorable instrument of death. Those who could verify that they were Roman citizens were to be beheaded, rather than undergoing crucifixion. In the Roman Republic of the early 1st century BC, it became the tradition for the severed heads of public enemies—such as the political opponents of Marius and Sulla—to be publicly displayed on the Rostra in the Forum Romanum after execution. Perhaps the most famous beheading was that of Cicero who, on instructions from Mark Antony, had his hands (which had penned the Philippicae against Antony) and his head cut off and nailed up for display in this manner.

Archaeological evidence of Roman-period executions by decapitation has also been found in the provinces. In Israel, seven cases of decapitation have been discovered, all dating to the Roman period and involving Jewish individuals. An additional case, uncovered in Jerusalem, appears to date from the early 1st century BCE and may be linked to the Judean Civil War during the reign of Alexander Jannaeus.

==== France ====
In France, until the abolition of capital punishment in 1981, the main method of execution had been by beheading by means of the guillotine. Other than a small number of military cases in which a firing squad was used (including that of Jean Bastien-Thiry), the guillotine was the only legal method of execution from 1791, when it was introduced by the Legislative Assembly during the last days of the kingdom French Revolution, until 1981. Before the revolution, beheading had typically been reserved for noblemen and carried out manually. In 1981, President François Mitterrand abolished capital punishment and issued commutations for those whose sentences had not been carried out.

The first person executed by the guillotine in France was highwayman Nicolas Jacques Pelletier in April 1792. The last execution was of murderer Hamida Djandoubi, in Marseille, in 1977. Throughout its extensive overseas colonies and dependencies, the device was also used, including on St Pierre in 1889 and on Martinique as late as 1965.

==== Nordic countries ====
In Nordic countries, decapitation was the usual means of carrying out capital punishment. Noblemen were beheaded with a sword, and commoners with an axe. The last executions by decapitation in Finland in 1825, Norway in 1876, Faroe Islands in 1609, and in Iceland in 1830 were carried out with axes. The same was the case in Denmark in 1892. Sweden continued the practice for a few decades, executing its second to last criminal—mass murderer Johan Filip Nordlund—by axe in 1900. It was replaced by the guillotine, which was used for the first and only time on Johan Alfred Ander in 1910.

Finland's official beheading axe resides today at the Museum of Crime in Vantaa. It is a broad-bladed two-handed axe. It was last used when murderer Tahvo Putkonen was executed in 1825, the last execution in peacetime in Finland.

==== Spain ====
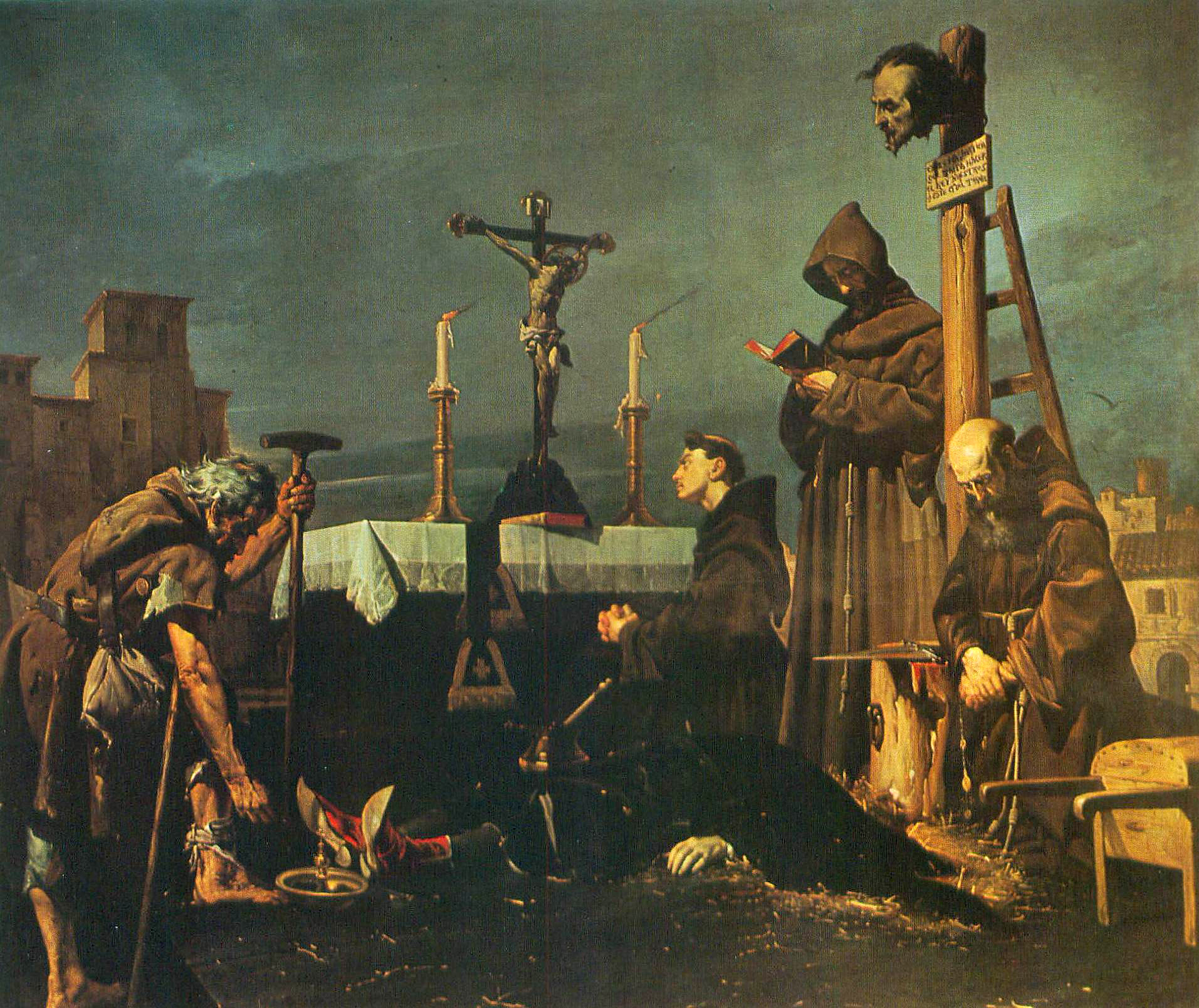
The beheading of the 15th Century Castilian Royal favorite, Don Álvaro de Luna. Painting by José María Rodríguez de Losada (1826–1896).

In Spain executions were carried out by various methods including strangulation by the garrotte. In the 16th and 17th centuries, noblemen were sometimes executed by means of beheading. Examples include Anthony van Stralen, Lord of Merksem, Lamoral, Count of Egmont and Philip de Montmorency, Count of Horn. They were tied to a chair on a scaffold. The executioner used a knife to cut the head from the body. It was considered to be a more honourable death if the executioner started with cutting the throat.

=== Middle East ===
==== Iran ====
Iran, since the 1979 Islamic Revolution, has alleged it uses beheading as one of the methods of punishment.

==== Iraq ====
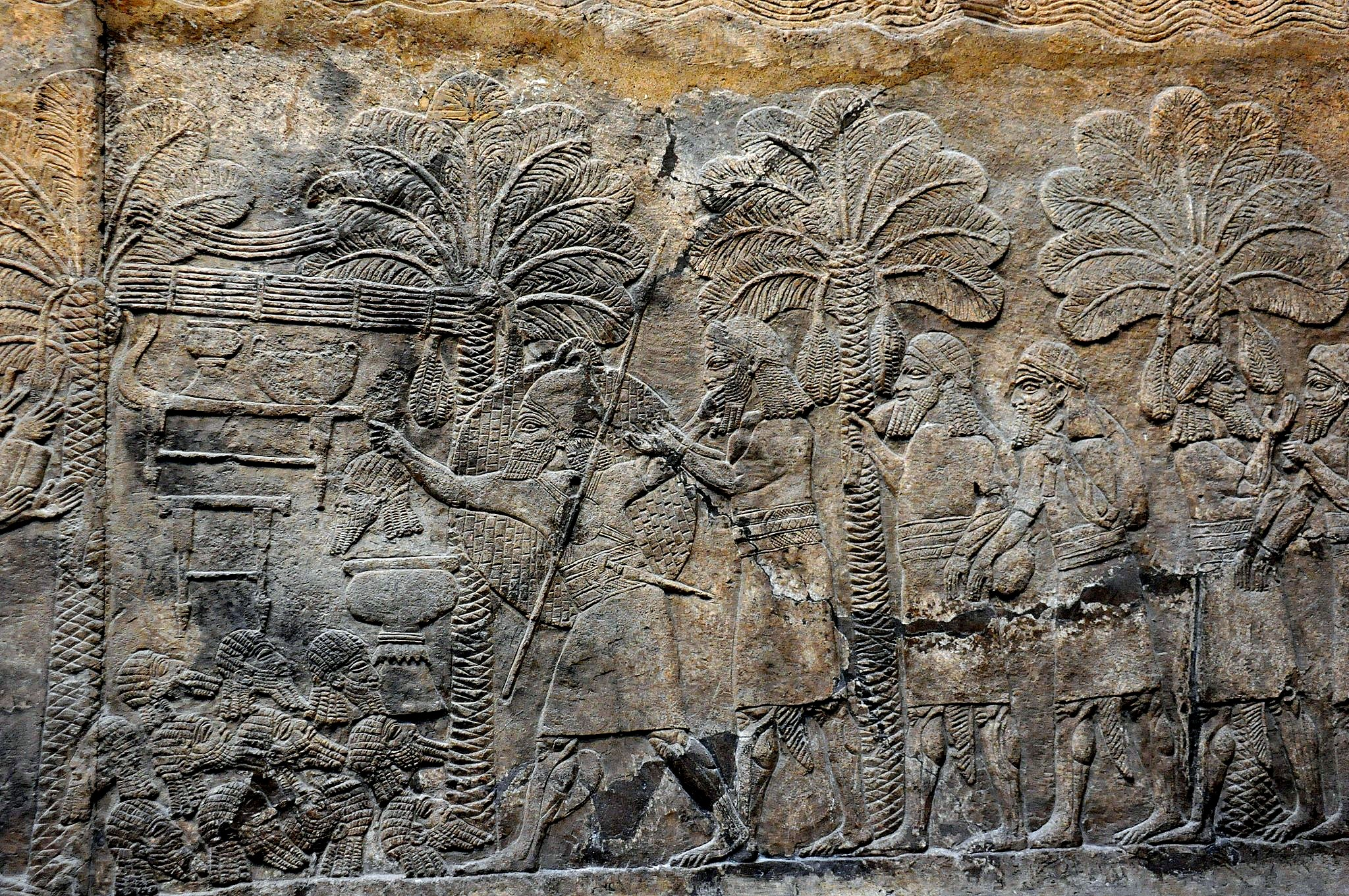
Assyrian military campaign in southern Mesopotamia, beheaded enemies, 7th century BC, from Nineveh, Iraq. The British Museum.

Though not officially sanctioned, legal beheadings were carried out against at least 50 prostitutes and pimps under Saddam Hussein as late as 2000.

Beheadings have emerged as another terror tactic especially in Iraq since 2003. Civilians have borne the brunt of the beheadings, although U.S. and Iraqi military personnel have also been targeted. After kidnapping the victim, the kidnappers typically make some sort of demand of the government of the hostage's nation and give a time limit for the demand to be carried out, often 72 hours. Beheading is often threatened if the government fails to heed the wishes of the hostage takers. Sometimes, the beheadings are videotaped and made available on the Internet. One of the most publicized of such executions was that of Nick Berg.

Judicial execution is practiced in Iraq, but is generally carried out by hanging.

==== Saudi Arabia ====
Saudi Arabia has a criminal justice system based on Shari'ah law reflecting a particular state-sanctioned interpretation of Islam. Crimes such as rape, murder, apostasy, and sorcery are punishable by beheading. It is usually carried out publicly by beheading with a sword.

A public beheading will typically take place around 9am. The convicted person is walked into the square and kneels in front of the executioner. The executioner uses a sword to remove the condemned person's head from their body at the neck with a single strike. After the convicted person is pronounced dead, a police official announces the crimes committed by the beheaded alleged criminal and the process is complete. The official might announce the same before the actual execution. This is the most common method of execution in Saudi Arabia.

According to Amnesty International, at least 79 people were executed in Saudi Arabia in 2013. Foreigners are not exempt, accounting for "almost half" of executions in 2013.

In 2015 Ashraf Fayadh (born 1980), a Saudi Arabian poet, was sentenced to be beheaded, but his sentence was later reduced to eight years in prison and 800 lashes, for apostasy.

==== Syria ====
The Syrian government employs hanging as its method of capital punishment. However, the terrorist organisation known as the Islamic State, which controlled territory in much of eastern Syria, had regularly carried out beheadings of people. Syrian rebels attempting to overthrow the Syrian government have been implicated in beheadings too.

=== North America ===
==== Mexico ====
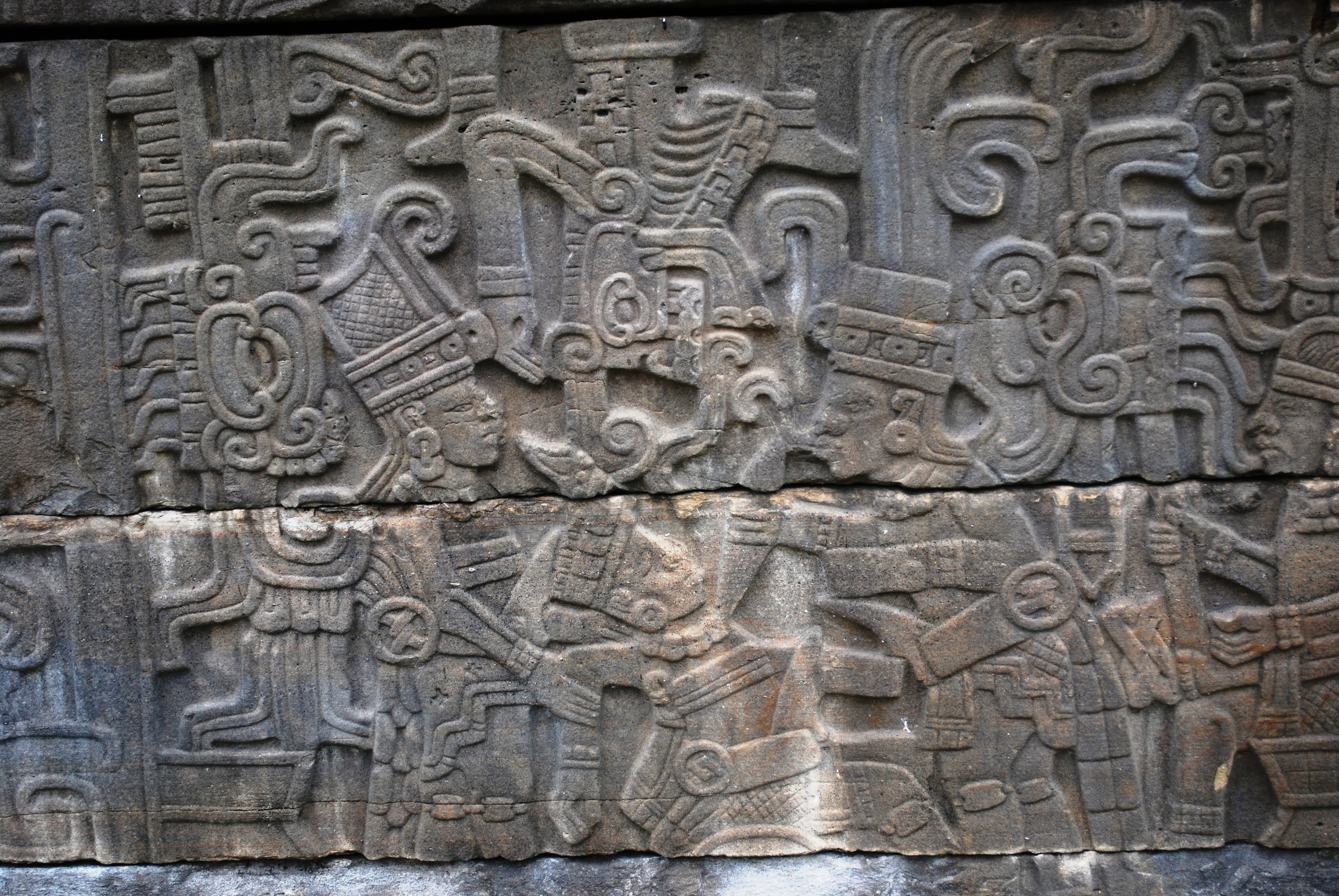
Panel showing ballplayer being beheaded, Classic Veracruz culture, Mexico

Miguel Hidalgo y Costilla, Ignacio Allende, José Mariano Jiménez and Juan Aldama were tried for treason, executed by firing squad and beheaded during the Mexican independence in 1811. Their heads were on display on the four corners of the Alhóndiga de Granaditas, in Guanajuato.

During the Mexican drug war, some Mexican drug cartels turned to decapitation and beheading of rival cartel members as a method of intimidation. This trend of beheading and publicly displaying the decapitated bodies was started by the Los Zetas, a criminal group composed by former Mexican special forces operators, trained in the infamous US Army School of the Americas, in torture techniques and psychological warfare.

==== United States ====
The United States government has never employed beheading as a legal method of execution. However, beheading has sometimes been used in mutilations of the dead, particularly during the time of slavery, such as Nat Turner, who led a rebellion against slavery. When caught, he was publicly hanged, flayed, and beheaded. This was a technique used by many enslavers to discourage the "frequent bloody uprisings" that were carried out by "kidnapped Africans". While bodily dismemberment of various kinds was employed to instill terror, Dr. Erasmus D. Fenner noted postmortem decapitation was particularly effective.

During the Vietnam War, as a terror tactic, "some American troops hacked the heads off... dead [Vietnamese] and mounted them on pikes or poles". Correspondent Michael Herr noted "thousands" of photo-albums made by US soldiers "all seemed to contain the same pictures": "the severed head shot, the head often resting on the chest of the dead man or being held up by a smiling Marine, or a lot of the heads, arranged in a row, with a burning cigarette in each of the mouths, the eyes open". Some of the victims were "very young".

General George Patton IV, son of the famous WWII general George S. Patton, was known for keeping "macabre souvenirs", such as "a Vietnamese skull that sat on his desk." Other Americans "hacked the heads off Vietnamese to keep, trade, or exchange for prizes offered by commanders."

Although the Utah Territory permitted a person sentenced to death to choose beheading as a means of execution, no person chose that option, and it was dropped when Utah became a state.

In July 2025, Florida enacted legislation that further expands the state's already extensive capital punishment laws to allow "any execution method not explicitly deemed unconstitutional," which includes beheading. This makes the United States the only country outside of the Islamic world that currently allows executions via beheading.

== See also ==
- Outline of capital punishment
- Atlanto-occipital dislocation, where the skull is dislodged from the spine; a generally, but not always, fatal injury.
- Beheading in Islam
- Beheading video
- Blood atonement
- Blood squirt, a result from a decapitation.
- Cephalophore, a martyred saint who is depicted carrying their severed head.
- Chhinnamasta, a Hindu goddess who supposedly decapitates herself and holds her head in her hand.
- Cleveland Torso Murderer, a serial killer who decapitated some of his victims.
- Dismemberment
- François-Jean de la Barre
- Headhunting
- List of methods of capital punishment
- Mike the Headless Chicken
- Head on a spike
