= Marie-Ange =

Marie-Ange is a feminine compound given name which may refer to:

== Women ==
- Marie-Ange Casalta (born 1978), French journalist and television presenter
- Marie-Ange Denieul, birth name of Marthe Niel (1878–1928), French aviator, second woman to earn a pilot's license
- Marie-Ange Kramo (born 1979), French footballer
- Marie-Ange Luciani (born 1979), French film producer
- Marie-Ange Magne (born 1987), French politician
- Marie-Ange Lukiana Mufwankolo, Democratic Republic of Congo politician
- Marie-Ange Mushobekwa, Congolese politician and Minister for Human Rights
- Marie-Ange Nardi (born 1961), French television presenter
- Marie-Ange Rimlinger (born 2001), French sprinter
- Marie-Ange Rousselot (born 1987), French politician
- Marie-Ange Todorovitch, French mezzo-soprano
- Marie-Ange Wirtz (born 1963), Seychellois sprinter

== Men ==
- Marie-Ange Somdah (born 1959), Burkinabe poet and writer
