= Kamwina Nsapu rebellion =

Rebellion in the DRC

- Provinces of the Democratic Republic of the Congo affected by the rebellion at its peak (dark red)
Date	8 August 2016 – c. 2019 (c. 3 years)
Location	Kasaï-Central, Kasaï, Kasaï-Oriental, Lomami, and Sankuru; DR Congo
Result	Government victory

Belligerents
Kamwina Nsapu rebels; Various independent militias	DR Congo; Allied militias: Bana Mura; Ecurie Mbembe; Smaller pro-government groups

Commanders and leaders
Jean-Pierre Mpandi "Kamwina Nsapu" †; No central leader since August 2016	(Democratic Republic of the Congo) Joseph Kabila (until Jan. 2019); (Democratic Republic of the Congo) Félix Tshisekedi (from Jan. 2019); (Democratic Republic of the Congo) Dieudonné Banze; (Democratic Republic of the Congo) Éric Ruhorimbere

Units involved
Unclear	Congolese security forces; Armed Forces; Police Force; Republican Guard; National Intelligence Agency

Strength
10,000+	Thousands

Casualties and losses
Thousands killed, captured, and surrendered	Hundreds killed and wounded
- Killed in total: c. 5,000 (UN estimate by August 2018); 3,300+ (Catholic Church estimate by June 2017); Displaced: 1.09 million internally, 35,000 to Angola

The Kamwina Nsapu rebellion, also spelled Kamuina Nsapu rebellion, was an uprising that took place in the Democratic Republic of the Congo between 2016 and 2019. It was instigated by the Kamwina Nsapu militia against state security forces in the provinces of Kasaï-Central, Kasaï, Kasaï-Oriental, Lomami and Sankuru. The fighting began after the militia, led by Kamwina Nsapu, attacked security forces in August 2016.

There was an ethnic aspect to the conflict: the rebels were mostly Luba and had selectively killed non-Luba.

== Background ==
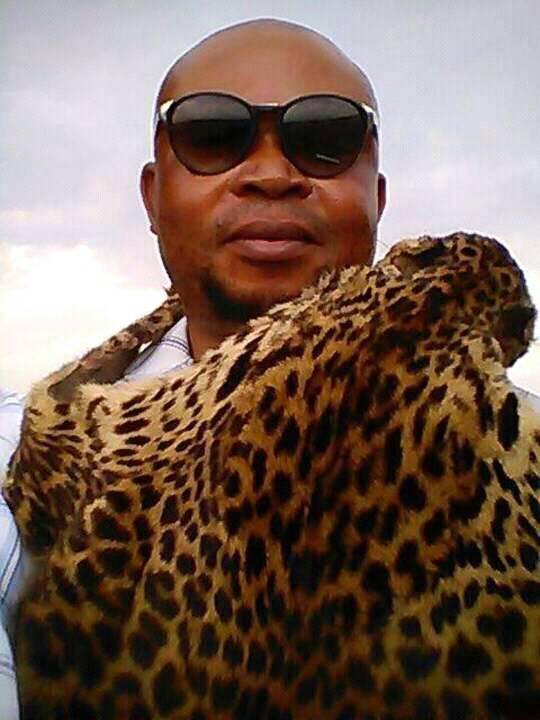
Jean-Pierre Mpandi, known as Kamwina Nsapu, in 2016

In 2011, Jean-Pierre Mpandi was designated to succeed his uncle and become the sixth head or Kamwina Nsapu (black ant) of his Bajila Kasanja clan, part of the wider Lulua ethnic group, after his return from South Africa where he had been convicted in a diamond-trafficking case. Such chiefs exercise significant control over land and are required to be recognized by the central state even if they are selected according to traditions. This policy encourages chiefs to support the Congolese central government to get its endorsement.

Mpandi's home region supported the opposition in the 2011 national elections, and tensions flared when the government appointed supporters, rather than tribal chiefs, to powerful positions in the local government. When Mpandi was about to be appointed head of the Bajila Kasanja clan, provincial governor Alex Kande told him that he would only confirm the appointment if Mpandi joined the governing party. Mpandi refused to do so, and began to openly question the provincial and national authorities' legitimacy. The central government consequently refused to recognise Kamwina Nsapu's appointment as chief. That led him to contest the central government's power, and he began calling for an insurrection in June 2016. At some point, an investigation team raided his home for the first time, ostensibly to search for illegal weapons. Mpandi was outraged, and accused the team of not only "profaning" his status as chief, but also of attempting to rape his wife.

== Rebellion ==
=== Beginning of the uprising and Kamwina Nsapu's death ===
Kamwina Nsapu incited his men with xenophobic language, referring to the regular security forces as foreign mercenaries and an occupation force. He caused a militia, named after him, to launch attacks on the local police. On 12 August 2016, he was killed alongside eight other militiamen and 11 policemen in Tshimbulu. Upon his death, the Congolese Observatory for Human Rights condemned his killing and suggested he should have been arrested instead. The government did not bury his remains according to local customs, triggering outrage among his followers.

Several of his followers refused to believe that he was dead and escalated the violence by intensifying their attacks on the security forces. As the violence by Kamwina Nsapu's men escalated, the uprising spread, and an increasing number of locals picked up arms against the government. Kamwina Nsapu's death meant that the rebellion effectively fractured into numerous movements, "all fighting for different reasons". The security forces responded brutally, escalating the conflict.

=== Main phase, 2016–2017 ===
In September 2016, Kamwina Nsapu's militia captured an area 180 km from Kananga and then captured the Kananga Airport before it was retaken by the Armed Forces of the Democratic Republic of the Congo. On 26 September 2016, the government announced that in total, 49 people had been killed (27 militiamen, 16 policemen and 6 civilians) and 185 militiamen captured since the fighting began.

In January 2017, four militiamen were killed, and two policemen were wounded. A few days later, the rebels called for the removal of the governor, Alex Kande, and protested the visit of Prime Minister Samy Badibanga. On 31 January 2017, a Roman Catholic priest from St. Alphonsus Parish in Kananga who tried to stop the militia from taking children from schools was kidnapped but was later released.

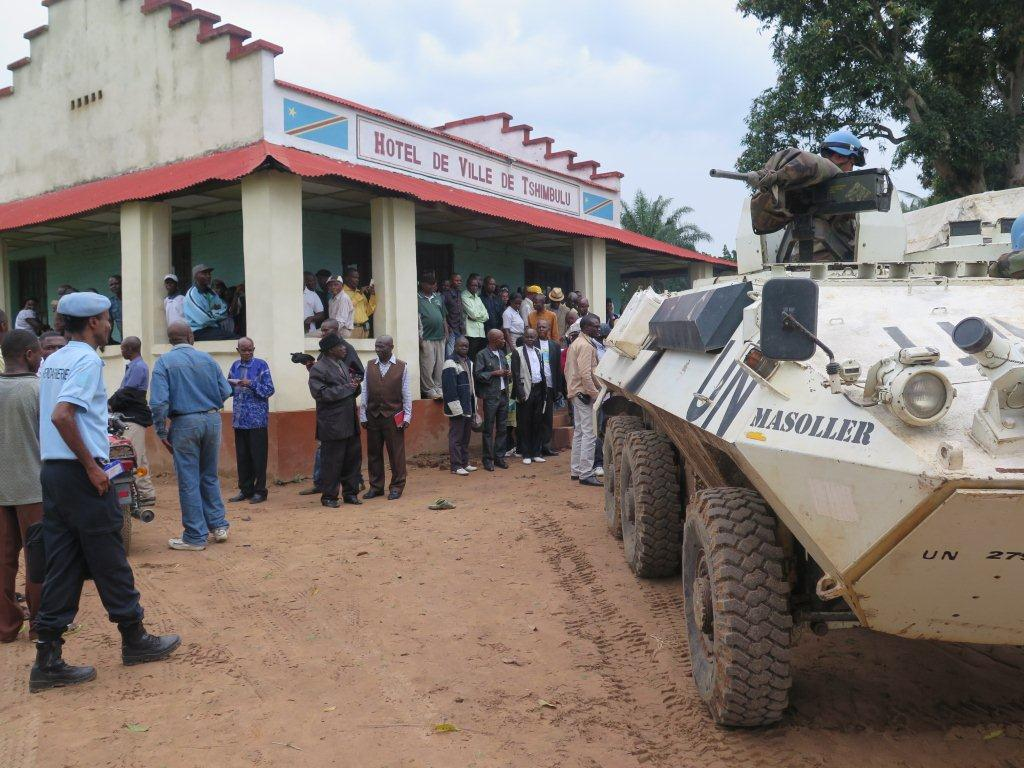
UN peacekeepers patrolling Tshimbulu, Kasaï-Central, on 20 February 2017 to promote dialogue in the region

On 9 February 2017, fighting erupted in Tshimbulu between 300 militiamen and the armed forces in a reprisal attack by the militia. At least six people were killed, including one civilian. By the next day, 60 to 75 were reported killed by the armed forces, while at least two servicemen had been wounded. On 14 February, United Nations human rights spokeswoman Liz Throssell announced that at least 101 people had been killed by government forces between 9 and 13 February, with 39 women confirmed to have been among them.

A few days later, a video showing members of the Congolese military killing civilians in the village of Mwanza Lomba was leaked. Human Rights Minister Marie-Ange Mushobekwa said that the video had not been authenticated, and Communications Minister Lambert Mende Omalanga said that it had filmed in another country "to destroy the image of the D.R.C."

Two journalists have received death threats for their coverage of the conflict: Sosthène Kambidi of Radio télévision chrétienne in Kananga and Fabrice Mfuamba of Radio Moyo in Tshimbulu.

On 18 February 2017, the Grand Séminaire de Malole (Great Seminary of Malole) in Kananga was ransacked by Kamwina Nsapu militants. It was the first time that they attacked a Roman Catholic target. Shortly after the attack, both Félicien Mwanama Galumbulula, the Bishop of Lwiza, and Laurent Monsengwo Pasinya, the Archbishop of Kinshasa, condemned the violence, and Justin Milonga, the vice governor of Kasaï-Central, called for the Kamwina Nsapu fighters to negotiate with the government. MONUSCO troops also toured Nganza and Malole in Kananga to calm the situation.

As a result of the clashes, many parents had stopped sending their children to school. However, on 26 February 2017, Justin Milonga, the vice governor of Kasaï-Central, said that the "insanity" needed to end and that children should resume going to school.

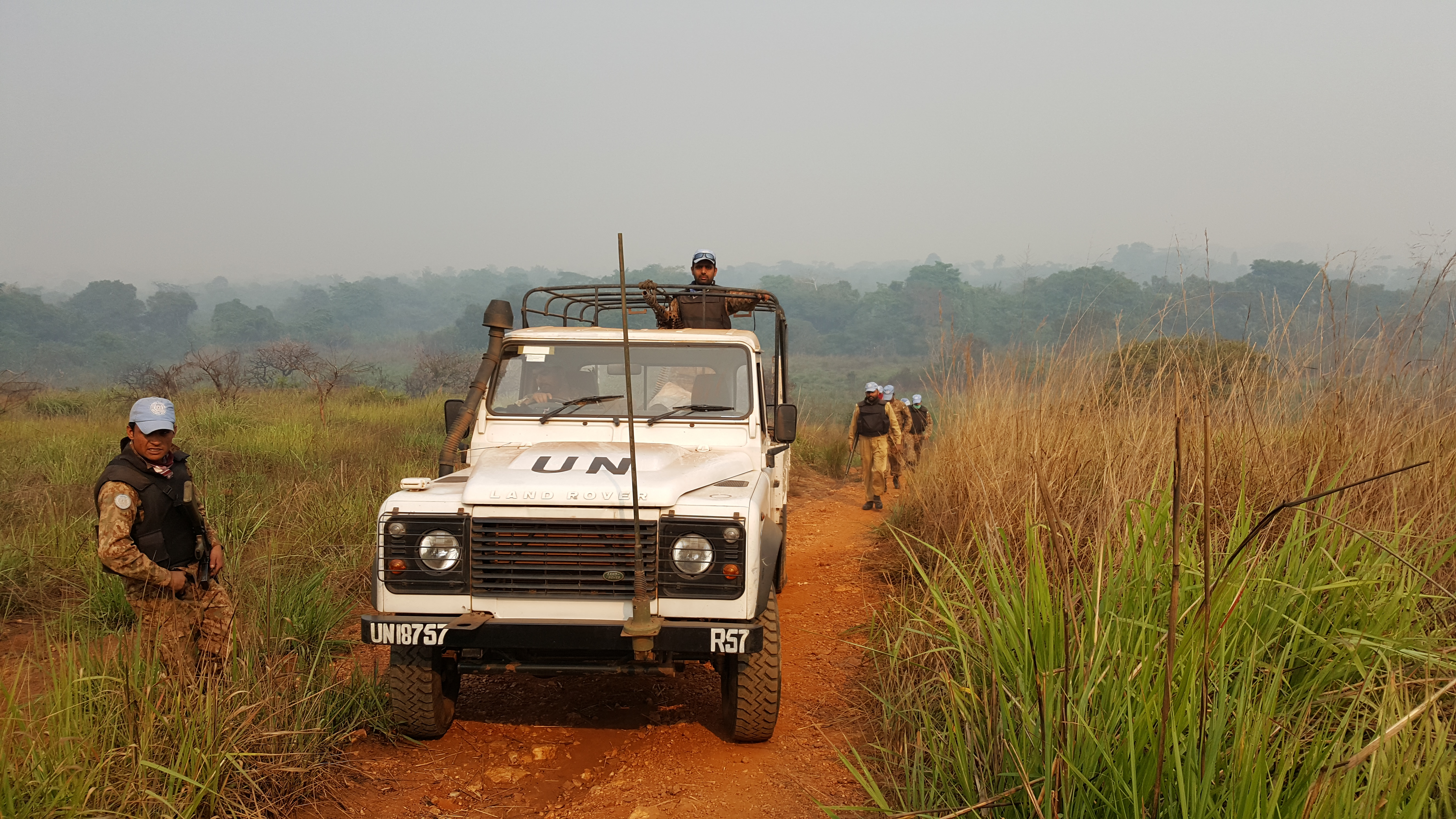
Pakistani peacekeepers on patrol in Kasaï-Central in late 2017

On 15 April 2017, the government returned the body of Kamwina Nsapu to the militia, one of its key demands, as a way of easing tensions and recognised his successor, Jacques Kabeya Ntumba, as a customary chief, as failure to recognize Nsapu had been a trigger for the fighting. Regardless, fighting continued to escalate, with the time of April to June 2017 being the most violent phase of the rebellion. At the insurgency's peak, it was estimated that Kamwina Nsapu factions had grown to over 10,000 fighters. Local Chokwe and Pende who felt threatened by the rebels set up self-defense groups, with Bana Mura and Ecurie Mbembe being the most notable ones. These militias allied with government forces, and became proactive as well. Chokwe, Pende, and Tetela militant groups organized ethnic cleansing operations, driving Luba from large areas to deprive the rebels of supporters and recruits. Kamwina Nsapu rebels responded by increasing their attacks on non-Luba civilians.

As the conflict continued to spread and escalate in violence, the government sent hardened troops from eastern Congo to fight the Kamwina Nsapu militia. The commanders of these reinforcements were "notorious for their brutality" and even included a former warlord who had once been sentenced by the government to death for his extreme behavior. Increasing reports surfaced of the military having massacred both captured rebels and Luba civilians who were suspected of supporting the insurgency. MONUSCO estimated that Congolese "state agents" had carried out 1,176 extrajudicial killings against protesters and anti-government activists in 2017, and that most of these killings occurred in areas affected by the Kamwina Nsapu rebellion. By October 2017, the uprising had been mostly contained by Congolese government forces.

=== Low-level insurgency in Kasaï ===
By early 2018, the government had retaken most of the areas in Kasaï and the surrounding regions which had previously been held by insurgents. Nevertheless, fighting continued and a new surge of violence in February 2018 caused about 11,000 people in Kasaï to flee their homes. On 15 September 2018, Ndaye Kalonga Nsabanga, the leader of a rebel coalition consisting of 8 militias, surrendered to the government in Kananga. Most of his forces, including the commanders of seven militias as well as 600 regular fighters, also laid down their weapons.

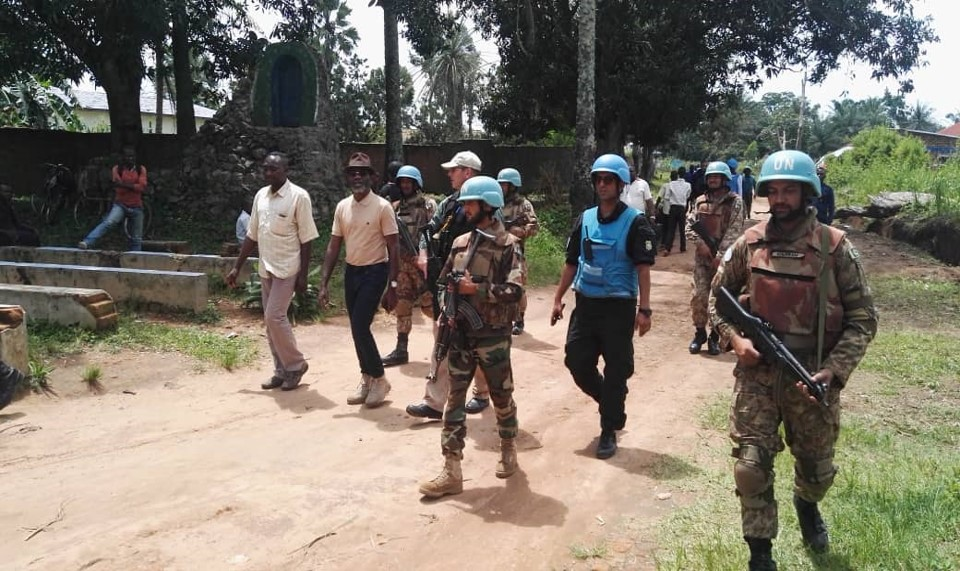
United Nations peacekeepers move into an area previously held by Kamwina Nsapu rebels in November 2018.

The United Nations estimated that about 5,000 people had been killed overall during the fighting by August 2018, though the violence did "still fall short of genocide". Several Kamwina Nsapu militias launched attacks during the Congolese general election on 30 December 2018. After the election resulted in the victory of opposition presidential candidate Félix Tshisekedi, about 743 Kamwina Nsapu insurgents along with three of their commanders (including Lokondo Luakatebua and Mubiayi Dewayi) surrendered in Kasaï in January 2019. In this way, the rebels showcased that they recognized Tshisekedi as new president and that they were ready to support him amid the ongoing disputes about the election results. By mid-2019, 1,500 rebels had surrendered. Although these surrenders were accompanied by a significant reduction in local fighting, it was estimated that around 90% of the insurgents had stopped fighting but not surrendered their weapons. Several rebels remained wary of the pro-government militias, as these generally remained under arms.

The security situation once again worsened in May 2019. Dissatisfied that the new government had not fulfilled its promises, several rebels had resumed their insurgency. The city of Kananga was particularly affected by an upsurge of violence. Exploiting the growing insecurity, a series of major jailbreaks took place in Kananga during which several Kamwina Nsapu members managed to escape, including four militants who were suspected of having previously murdered two UN experts. One of them, Trésor Mputu Kankonde, allegedly attempted to rally and reorganize Kamwina Nsapu rebels before being recaptured by Congolese security forces. According to the UN Children's Fund, 653 schools and 223 health centers were plundered amid the fighting between rebels and government forces in the Kasai region in May 2019.

=== Aftermath ===
In March 2021, a Kamwina Nsapu militia leader, Laurent Nsumbu, was sentenced to life imprisonment by the Kananga Military Tribunal for war crimes. The NGO TRIAL International hailed this event as important in finally addressing the violations of human rights during the rebellion.

In August 2021, Kasaians gathered in Kinshasa for a requiem to honour those who had died during the Kamwina Nsapu rebellion. The organisers demanded justice for those who had been hurt or killed by the government forces and allied militias.

== Rebel forces ==
The Kamwina Nsapu rebels were only loosely connected and operated in various autonomous factions. They lacked an "identifiable leader" since Kamwina Nsapu's death, but individual factions were known to have leaders such as "General" Gaylord Tshimbala and opposition politicians were rumoured to support the uprising. The rebels were united in their opposition against the government and had adopted red as unifying colour of their uprising. Kamwina Nsapu fighters thus usually identified themselves by wearing red headbands or armbands.

Although relatively poorly armed, with most of their weaponry looted or stolen from the Congolese security forces, the rebels were strongly motivated by their belief in various forms of witchcraft: Many Kamwina Nsapu rebels believed in gaining magical protection from harm by wearing fetishes, specific leaves, and protective amulets. Elements of the Kamwina Nsapu militia were described as "cultlike" due to their beliefs. For example, recruits were reportedly forced to walk through fire and told that by undergoing the initiation ritual, they would be resurrected if they were killed in battle. Some fighters also believed that wooden weapons can be transformed into functioning guns by magical rituals.

The militia had also been noted for its extensive recruitment of child soldiers. Experts considered it likely that most of the rebels were children. Child soldiers were promised jobs and money and were often given drugs and alcohol in order to motivate them to fight.

As a result of its splintered nature, rebellion lacked clear goals. Common demands by members of the militia were, however, the return of and the proper burial of their slain leader, which the government conceded in March or April 2017, reparations for the chief's family, the restoration of damaged hospitals and schools by the central authorities, "social and economic development of the region" and the release of imprisoned rebels as well as civilians. Since February 2017, a purported spokesman of the group had also demanded the implementation of the agreement between Kabila and the opposition after the December 2016 Congolese protests.

== Atrocities ==
=== Ethnic cleansing ===
The conflict evolved from a rebellion against the state into ethnic violence. Most of the rebels were Luba and Lulua, and they reportedly targeted the Pende and the Chokwe. On 24 March 2017, militiamen reportedly killed and decapitated at least 40 policemen and spared six, who spoke the local Tshiluba language.

The Bana Mura militia, a group dominated by Chokwe, Pende, and Tetela, committed a string of ethnically motivated attacks against the Luba and Lulua. It was linked to the government and victims stated that the army and police accompanied it in attacks. It was reported to have committed atrocities such as cutting off toddlers' limbs, stabbing pregnant women and mutilating fetuses, and it was blamed for the murder of 49 minors in 2017.

=== Child soldiers ===
The Kamwina Nsapu militia recruited thousands of child soldiers, with some being as young as 5, and Congolese authorities claimed that many in its ranks were under the influence of drugs.

=== Slavery ===
The UN Human Rights Council denounced "slavery-like" practices on parts of Bana Mura militants who were involved in fighting the rebellion. They kidnapped civilians and consequently used them for forced labour on farms.

== Casualties ==
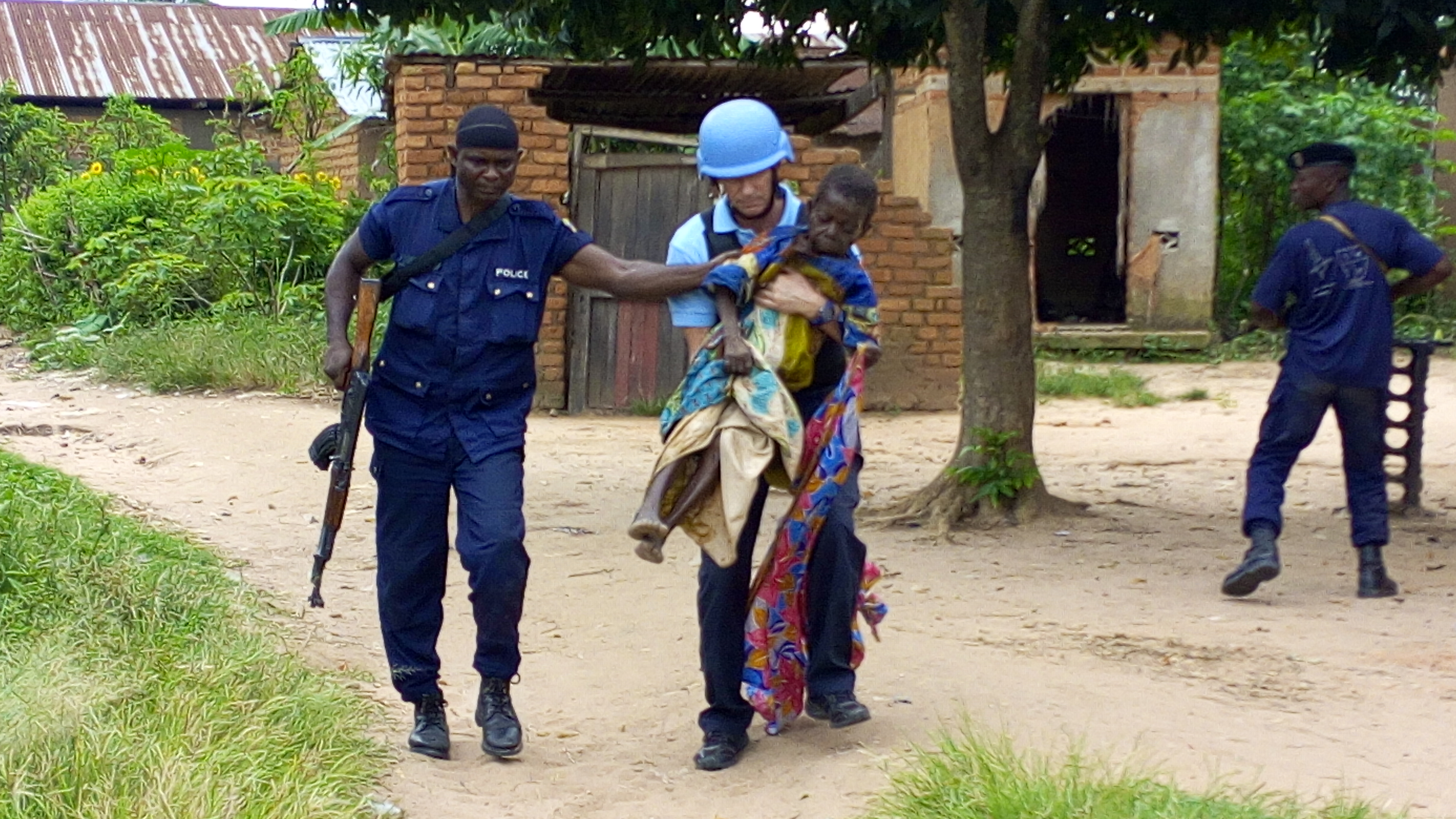
A woman is evacuated by Congolese and MONUSCO police officers during a rebel attack. She has been stabbed by a machete. Kananga, 14 March 2017.

Between October 2016 and June 2017, more than 3,300 people had been killed and 20 villages had been completely destroyed, half of them by government troops, according to the Catholic Church.

Two U.N. investigators Zaida Catalan and Michael Sharp were killed during the conflict.

== International reactions ==
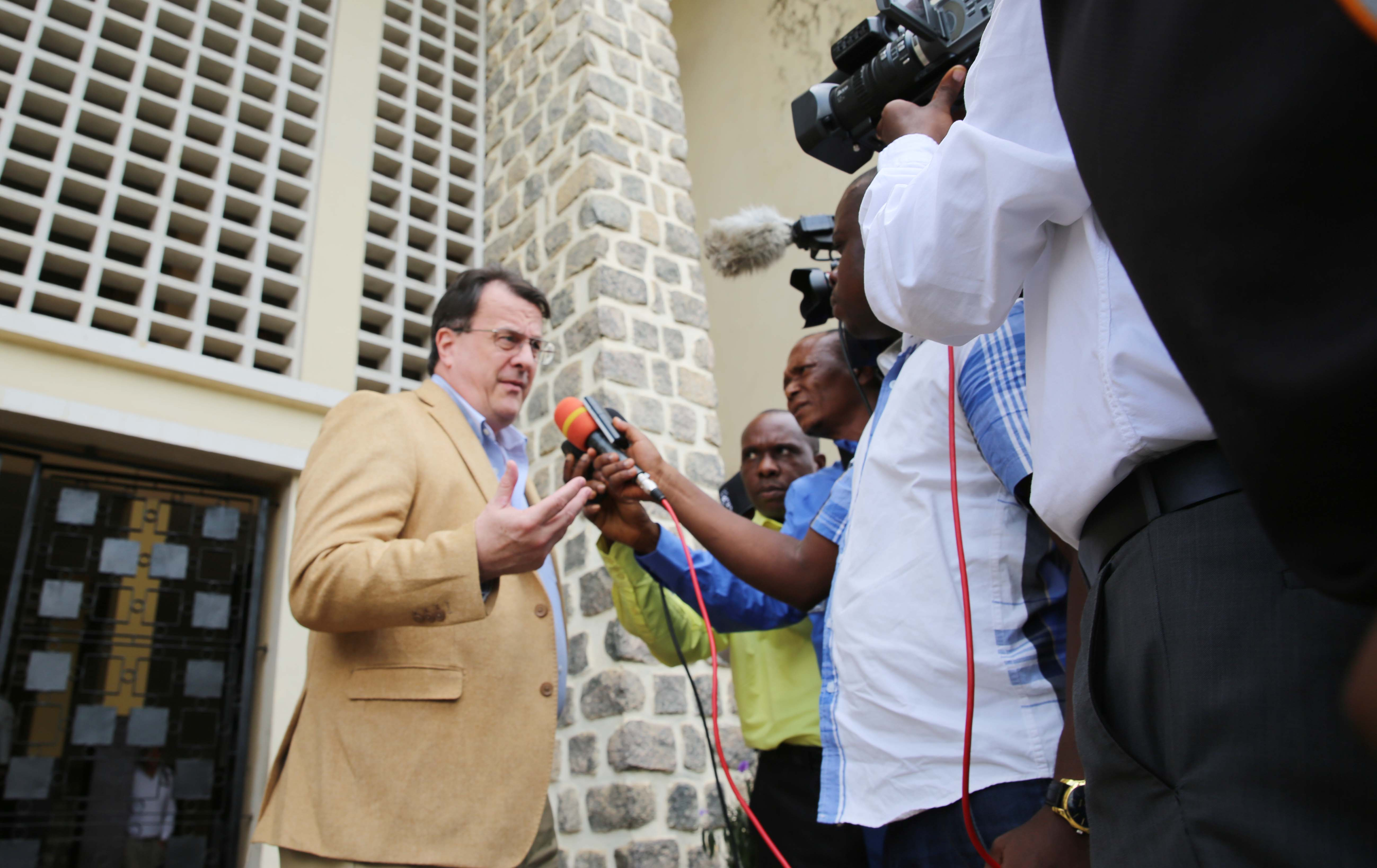
UN Deputy Special Representative David Gressly speaks with the press after meeting with MONUSCO and Congolese officials to discuss the conflict.

On 11 February 2017, the United Nations Organization Stabilization Mission in the Democratic Republic of the Congo (MONUSCO) said in a statement that it was "concerned about the persistent conflict in the Kasais". It condemned the "recruitment and use of child soldiers" and "the disproportionate use of force" by the Congolese forces in retaliation.

In his angelus message on 16 February 2017, Pope Francis called for an end to the violence, especially the use of child soldiers. He said, "I suffer deeply for the victims, especially for so many children ripped from their families and their schools to be used as soldiers."

On 19 February 2017, Mark C. Toner, the Deputy Spokesperson of the US Department of State called for an investigation into the video of the alleged Mwanza Lomba massacre.

On 20 February 2017, the French Ministry of Foreign Affairs and International Development also called for an investigation into the video. In an official statement, it said, "France condemns the bloody violence which has rocked the Kasai region for several months. It calls on the Congolese authorities and security forces to shoulder their primary responsibility to protect civilians, fully respecting human rights".

On 13 March 2017, two UN investigators (Zaida Catalán and Michael Sharp) were murdered in Kasai, with both the Congolese government and the Kamunia Nsapu militia naming each other as the culprits. A video published by the Congolese government on April 24 seems to point to the militia.
