= Klein Henszlein =

16th-century German pirate

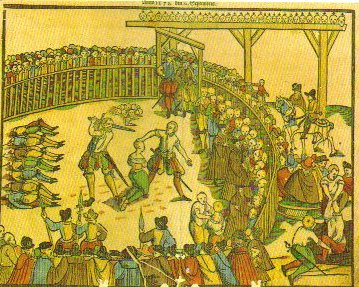
A flyer describing the 1573 execution of Henszlein and his crew.

Klein Henszlein [Klaus Hanslein] (died 1573) was a German pirate active from 1560 to 1573 who raided shipping in the North Sea until his defeat and capture by a fleet from Hamburg. Taken back to Hamburg, Henszlein and his men were paraded through the city streets before being beheaded on September 10, 1573; their heads were then impaled on stakes. In a later account, the executioner described how he "flicked off" the heads of the thirty-three pirates (not including Henszlein) in only 45 minutes, then proceeding to behead the bodies of those pirates killed during their capture. He later claimed to have been "standing in blood so deep that it well nigh in his shoes did creep".
