= Mwanza Lomba =

Mwanza Lomba is a village in Kasai-Oriental, the Democratic Republic of the Congo.

In February 2017, in the midst of the Kasaï-Central clashes, a video showing members of the Congolese military killing civilians in the village was leaked online. Both France and the United States called for an investigation into the alleged massacre.
