= Marie-Ange Casalta =

French journalist and television presenter

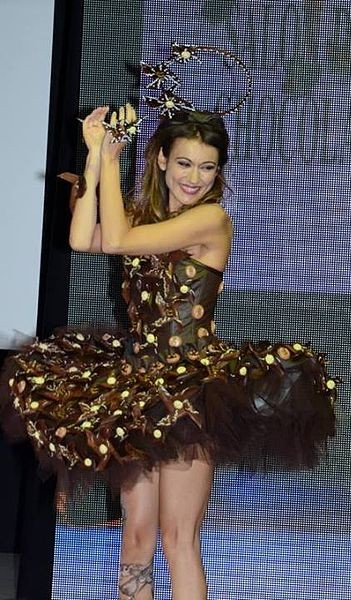
- Marie-Ange Casalta in 2013 at the Salon du Chocolat
- Born: August 6, 1978 (age 47); Toulouse, France
- Occupations: Journalist, television presenter
- Years active: 2007–present
- Television: Enquête d'action (W9); Vies croisées (W9); 100% Mag (M6)
- Spouse: Romuald Boulanger (m. 2009)
- Children: 2

Marie-Ange Casalta (born August 6, 1978) is a French journalist and television presenter.

== Early life and education ==
Marie-Ange Casalta was born in Toulouse in the department of Haute-Garonne and is from Corsican origin. She graduated with a bilingual degree in journalism (DESS) at the Sorbonne.

== Television career ==
She started working in the United States for CNN, in the United Kingdom and the Netherlands. In 2007, she started working for the news channel i>Télé before joining NRJ Paris in 2008 to present a news broadcasting and a talk show.

The same year, she joined the channel W9 the present the investigation program W9 Mag. In April 2009, she co-hosts on the same channel the investigation program Enquête d'action with François Pécheux. From June to August 2009, she briefly presents on M6 the information program C'est positif broadcast at the middle of the day. After the departure of François Pécheux at France 3, she hosts all alone the program Enquête d'action on W9.

Since March 2010, she briefly replaces Estelle Denis and then Faustine Bollaert to host the daily program 100% Mag on M6, especially in Summer 2010 and 2011 in which she travels in different French regions in L'été de 100% Mag.

== Personal life ==
In 2009, Marie-Ange Casalta married radio host, screenwriter and film producer Romuald Boulanger. She gave birth on June 8, 2014, to her first child, a son named James.
