= Tshimbulu =

- Commune
- Commune de Tshimbulu
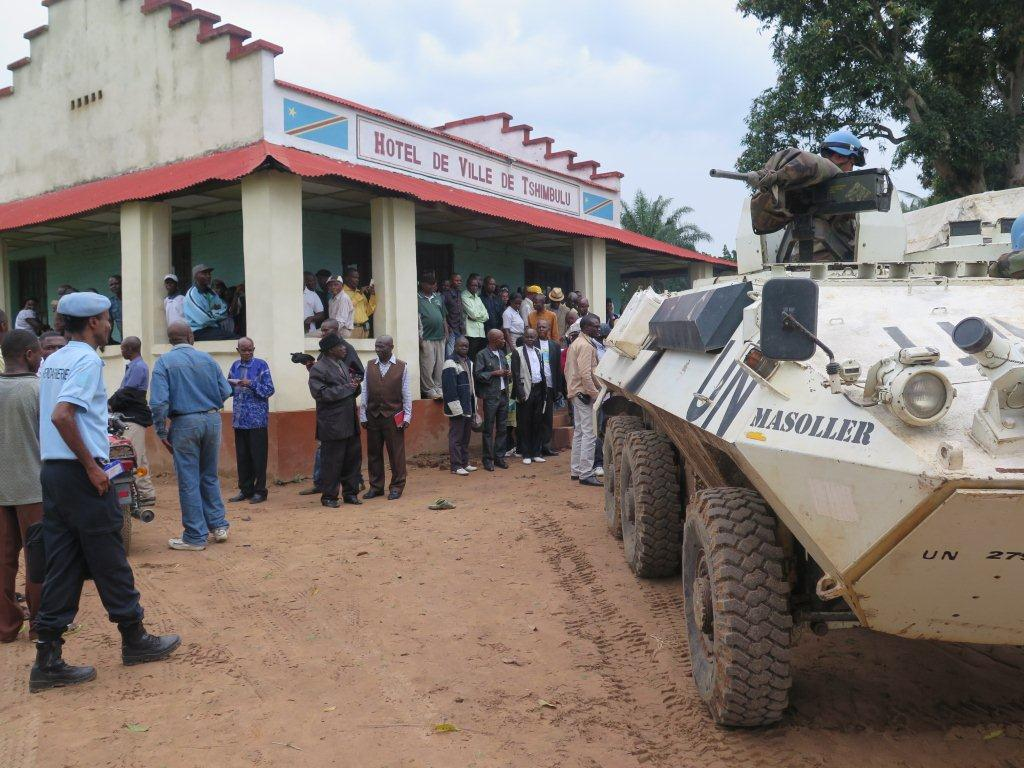
- United Nations forces pictured by Tshimbulu's town hall in February 2017

- Location in the Democratic Republic of the Congo
- Coordinates: 6.4787°S 22.8612°E
- Country: Democratic Republic of the Congo
- Province: Kasaï-Central
- Territory: Dibaya

Tshimbulu is a town in Kasaï-Central, Democratic Republic of the Congo.
