= Bana Mura =

Congolese militant group

Bana Mura is an armed militant group active in the Kasaï region of the Democratic Republic of Congo. It mostly recruits ethnic Chokwe, Pende, and Tetela, and is supported by the Congolese government. According to the United Nations, the group destroyed approximately 20 villages over the span of two months in 2017.

== History ==
Zeid Raad Hussein of the Office of the United Nations High Commissioner for Human Rights has stated that the group was created and armed by the Democratic Republic of Congo in order to counter the Kamwina Nsapu rebellion.

The group has been accused of committing numerous atrocities, including massacring civilians. The group has reportedly committed attacked civilians belonging to the Luba and Lulua ethnic groups. Bana Mura members have also enslaved civilians, forcing them to work on their farms.
