= Marie-Ange Mushobekwa =

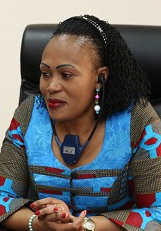
Marie-Ange Mushobekwa in 2017.

Marie-Ange Mushobekwa Likulia is a Congolese politician. She serves as the Minister for Human Rights of the Democratic Republic of the Congo.
