= 2006 Sport Club Internacional season =

The Sport Club Internacional won two important titles in the year 2006: Copa Libertadores and Fifa Club World Cup.

== Squad ==
=== Squad statistics ===
Pos.	Name	Gauchão		Brasileiro		Libertadores		World Cup		Others		Total		Discipline	
Pos.	Name	Apps	Goals	Apps	Goals	Apps	Goals	Apps	Goals	Apps	Goals	Apps	Goals	Yellow card	Red card
GK	(Brazil) Boeck	8	-10	3	-3	1	-2	0	0	1	-1	13	-16	1	0
GK	(Brazil) Clemer	10	-4	22	-27	13	-9	2	-1	0	0	47	-41	3	0
GK	(Brazil) Renan	0	0	14	-6	0	0	0	0	1	0	15	-6	2	0
DF	(Brazil) Ari	2	0	0	0	0	0	0	0	1	0	3	0	0	0
DF	(Brazil) Bolivar	13	2	9	0	14	1	0	0	1	0	37	3	9	0
DF	(Brazil) Camozzato	0	0	3	0	0	0	0	0	0	0	3	0	1	0
DF	(Brazil) Ceará	11	0	31	3	10	1	2	0	1	0	55	4	1	1
DF	(Brazil) Chiquinho	7	1	5	0	0	0	0	0	1	0	13	1	0	0
DF	(Brazil) Daniel	4	0	0	0	0	0	0	0	1	0	5	0	1	0
DF	(Brazil) Danny	0	0	2	0	0	0	0	0	0	0	2	0	0	0
DF	(Brazil) Ediglê	5	0	16	0	2	0	0	0	1	1	24	1	8	3
DF	(Brazil) Eller	13	0	29	5	14	0	2	0	0	0	58	5	10	1
DF	(Brazil) Felipe	0	0	1	0	0	0	0	0	0	0	1	0	1	0
DF	(Brazil) Granja	9	0	4	0	5	0	0	0	0	0	18	0	3	1
DF	(Peru) Hidalgo	0	0	13	0	0	0	1	0	0	0	14	0	4	0
DF	(Brazil) Índio	2	0	27	5	4	0	2	0	0	0	35	5	6	0
DF	(Brazil) João Guilherme	2	0	1	0	0	0	0	0	1	0	4	0	0	0
DF	(Brazil) Ramon	0	0	9	0	0	0	0	0	0	0	9	0	2	0
DF	(Brazil) Rubens	11	1	12	0	6	1	2	0	1	0	32	2	4	2
MF	(Brazil) Adriano	0	0	22	3	8	2	1	1	0	0	31	6	7	0
MF	(Brazil) Alex	2	1	16	5	8	1	2	0	0	0	28	7	7	0
MF	(Brazil) Álvaro	4	0	3	0	0	0	0	0	1	0	8	0	3	0
MF	(Brazil) A. Moritz	2	0	0	0	0	0	0	0	1	0	3	0	0	0
MF	(Brazil) Caio	0	0	8	0	0	0	0	0	0	0	8	0	0	0
MF	(Brazil) Diogo	2	0	0	0	0	0	0	0	1	0	3	0	0	0
MF	(Brazil) Edinho	12	0	28	0	11	0	2	0	0	0	53	0	19	1
MF	(Brazil) Fabinho	13	1	13	1	12	0	0	0	1	0	39	2	4	1
MF	(Brazil) J. Wagner	9	3	8	1	13	2	0	0	0	0	'30	6	5	0
MF	(Brazil) Maycon	5	0	12	0	0	0	0	0	0	0	17	0	3	0
MF	(Brazil) Monteiro	0	0	26	0	3	0	2	0	0	0	31	0	4	0
MF	(Brazil) Perdigão	13	0	25	0	8	0	0	0	1	0	47	0	17	2
MF	(Brazil) Pinga	0	0	4	0	0	0	0	0	0	0	4	0	0	0
MF	(Brazil) R. Paulista	1	0	0	0	0	0	0	0	0	0	1	0	0	0
MF	(Brazil) Tinga	8	1	6	1	9	1	0	0	0	0	23	3	4	1
MF	(Colombia) Vargas	0	0	4	0	0	0	2	0	0	0	6	0	3	0
FW	(Brazil) Fernandão	9	4	20	8	13	5	2	0	0	0	44	17	8	0
FW	(Brazil) Gustavo	4	2	0	0	0	0	0	0	1	1	5	3	0	0
FW	(Brazil) Iarley	13	4	30	10	8	0	2	0	1	0	54	14	8	0
FW	(Brazil) Leo	11	5	11	1	0	0	0	0	1	1	23	7	4	0
FW	(Brazil) L. Adriano	2	1	12	0	0	0	2	1	1	2	17	4	1	0
FW	(Brazil) Michel	12	5	17	1	11	3	0	0	1	0	41	9	5	0
FW	(Brazil) Mossoró	14	4	9	0	5	0	0	0	1	0	29	4	3	0
FW	(Brazil) Pato	0	0	1	1	0	0	2	1	0	0	3	2	0	0
FW	(Colombia) Rentería	12	4	25	2	9	4	0	0	0	0	46	10	10	1
FW	(Brazil) R. Jesus	3	0	5	0	0	0	0	0	1	0	9	0	0	0
FW	(Brazil) Sóbis	4	0	9	3	8	3	0	0	0	0	21	6	2	0

=== Libertadores 2006 squad ===
Goalkeepers
1	(Brazil) Clemer
12	(Brazil) Boeck
22	(Brazil) Renan

Defenders
2	(Brazil) Élder Granja
3	(Brazil) Bolivar
4	(Brazil) Fabiano Eller
6	(Brazil) Rubens Cardoso
13	(Brazil) Índio
14	(Brazil) Ceará
16	(Brazil) Ediglê

Midfielders
5	(Brazil) Fabinho
7	(Brazil) Tinga
8	(Brazil) Perdigão
15	(Brazil) Edinho
17	(Brazil) Mossoró
21	(Brazil) Wellington Monteiro
23	(Brazil) Jorge Wagner
24	(Brazil) Alex
25	(Brazil) Adriano

Forwards
9	(Brazil) Fernandão
10	(Brazil) Iarley
11	(Brazil) Rafael Sóbis
18	(Brazil) Michel
19	(Colombia) Rentería
20	(Brazil) Léo

Coach
(Brazil) Abel Braga

=== FIFA Club World Cup 2006 squad ===
Goalkeepers
1	(Brazil) Clemer
12	(Brazil) Renan
22	(Brazil) Boeck

Defenders
2	(Brazil) Ceará
3	(Brazil) Índio
4	(Brazil) Fabiano Eller
6	(Peru) Hidalgo
13	(Brazil) Ediglê
15	(Brazil) Rubens Cardoso
21	(Brazil) Élder Granja

Midfielders
5	(Brazil) Wellington Monteiro
7	(Brazil) Alex
8	(Brazil) Edinho
14	(Brazil) Fabinho
16	(Brazil) Adriano
17	(Colombia) Vargas
20	(Brazil) Perdigão

Forwards
9	(Brazil) Fernandão
10	(Brazil) Iarley
11	(Brazil) Alexandre Pato
18	(Brazil) Luiz Adriano
19	(Brazil) Léo
23	(Brazil) Michel

Coach
(Brazil) Abel Braga

=== Transfers in ===
—	MF	BRA	Adriano (From (Brazil) Cruzeiro)
—	DF	BRA	Ari (From (Japan) Kashima Antlers)
—	DF	BRA	Daniel Marques (From (Brazil) Paraná Clube)
—	DF	BRA	Fabiano Eller (From (Turkey) Trabzonspor)
—	MF	BRA	Fabinho (From (Brazil) Santos)
—	DF	PER	Hidalgo (From (Paraguay) Libertad)
—	MF	BRA	Ji-Paraná (From (Brazil) Corinthians)
—	MF	BRA	Jorge Wagner (From (Russia) Lokomotiv)
—	MF	BRA	Pinga (From (Italy) Treviso)
—	DF	BRA	Rafael dos Santos (From (Brazil) Ponte Preta)
—	MF	COL	Vargas (From (Argentina) Boca Jrs)

=== Transfers out ===
—	DF	BRA	Ari (to (Brazil) Atlético Mineiro)
—	DF	BRA	Bolivar (to (France) AS Monaco)
—	DF	BRA	Daniel Marques (to (Brazil) Atlético Mineiro)
—	MF	BRA	Jorge Wagner (to (Spain) Real Betis)
—	FW	BRA	Rafael Sóbis (to (Spain) Real Betis)
—	FW	COL	Rentería (to (Portugal) Porto)
—	MF	BRA	Tinga (to (Germany) Borussia Dortmund)

== Season 2006 ==
=== Friendly ===
==== Matches ====
13 January 2006
12h00 (UTC-3)

Esportivo	1–5	Internacional
Valdiran 10'	(pt)	Ediglê 7'; Luiz Adriano 25' 45'; Gustavo 78'; Leo 81'

Parque Esportivo Montanha dos Vinhedos-Bento Gonçalves

=== Campeonato Gaúcho ===
==== I Fase ====
===== Matches =====
19 January 2006
18h10 (UTC-3)

Internacional	3–1	Gaúcho
Bolivar 19'; Leo 33'; Luiz Adriano 86'	(pt)	Ornélio 82'

Beira-Rio Stadium -Porto Alegre

22 January 2006
21h45 (UTC-3)

Passo Fundo	3–4	Internacional
Felipe 37' 87'; Ferreira 55'	(pt)	Mossoró 12' 66'; Iarley 20'; Michel 39'

Vermelhão da Serra Stadium -Passo Fundo

25 January 2006
21h45 (UTC-3)

Ulbra	1–0	Internacional
Váldson 57'	(pt)

Complexo da Ulbra Stadium -Canoas

28 January 2006
18h10 (UTC-3)

Internacional	2–0	Caxias
Fernandão 48' 59'	(pt)

Beira-Rio Stadium -Porto Alegre

31 January 2006
20h30 (UTC-3)

Internacional	1–0	15 de Novembro
Michel 67'	(pt)

Beira-Rio Stadium -Porto Alegre

2 February 2006
16h00 (UTC-3)

Caxias	1–1	Internacional
Eller 32' (o.g.)	(pt)	Fernandão 28'

Centenário Stadium -Caxias do Sul

5 February 2006
20h30 (UTC-3)

Internacional	4–0	Passo Fundo
Michel 34'; Gustavo 53' 61'; Jorge Wagner 90'	(pt)

Beira-Rio Stadium -Porto Alegre

8 February 2006
21h45 (UTC-3)

Gaúcho	0–2	Internacional
	(pt)	Leo 51' 71'

Vermelhão da Serra Stadium -Passo Fundo

12 February 2006
16h (UTC-3)

15 de Novembro	0–0	Internacional
	(pt)

Sady Schmidt Stadium -Campo Bom

19 February 2006
16h (UTC-3)

Internacional	3–1	Ulbra
Rentería 46'; Mossoró 83'; Jorge Wagner 87'	(pt)	Fabiano 31'

Beira-Rio Stadium -Porto Alegre

===== Classification =====
Group

Pos	Club	Pld	W	D	L	F	A	GD	Pts
1	Internacional	10	7	2	1	20	7	+13	23
2	Caxias	10	5	1	4	14	13	+1	16
3	Ulbra	10	4	2	4	18	13	+5	14

===== Results summary =====
Overall								Home						Away					
Pld	W	D	L	GF	GA	GD	Pts	W	D	L	GF	GA	GD	W	D	L	GF	GA	GD
10	7	2	1	20	7	+13	23	5	0	0	13	2	+11	2	2	1	7	5	+2

Last updated: 10 February 2006.
Source: Campeonato Gaúcho

Pld = Matches played; W = Matches won; D = Matches drawn; L = Matches lost;

==== II Fase ====
===== Matches =====
26 February 2006
16h (UTC-3)

Internacional	4–1	São José
Iarley 10' 47'; Michel 24'; Bolivar 34'	(pt)	Toledo 85'

Beira-Rio Stadium -Porto Alegre

1 March 2006
21h45 (UTC-3)

Novo Hamburgo	1–2	Internacional
Giancarlo 88'	(pt)	Rentería 23'; Michel 37'

Santa Rosa Stadium -Novo Hamburgo

4 March 2006
16h (UTC-3)

Internacional	2–1	Caxias
Rubens 47'; Tinga 52'	(pt)	Aílton (45;+1)

Beira-Rio Stadium -Porto Alegre

12 March 2006
16h (UTC-3)

Caxias	0–3	Internacional
	(pt)	Mossoró 25'; Iarley 48'; Fabinho 90'

Centenário Stadium -Caxias do Sul

18 March 2006
16h (UTC-3)

Internacional	1–0	Novo Hamburgo
Rentería 60'	(pt)

Beira-Rio Stadium -Porto Alegre

26 March 2006
16h (UTC-3)

São José	2–6	Internacional
Bruno 19'; Zé Alcino 77'	(pt)	Chiquinho 10'; Jorge Wagner (45;+4); Leo 47' 58'; Rentería 56'; Alex (90;+3)

Passo D’Areia Stadium -Porto Alegre

===== Classification =====
Group

Pos	Club	Pld	W	D	L	F	A	GD	Pts
1	Internacional	6	6	0	0	18	5	+13	18
2	Caxias	6	2	2	2	9	11	-2	8
3	São José	6	1	1	4	7	15	-8	4

===== Results summary =====
Overall								Home						Away					
Pld	W	D	L	GF	GA	GD	Pts	W	D	L	GF	GA	GD	W	D	L	GF	GA	GD
6	6	0	0	18	5	+13	18	3	0	0	7	2	+5	3	0	0	11	3	+8

Last updated: 20 February 2008.
Source: Campeonato Gaúcho

Pld = Matches played; W = Matches won; D = Matches drawn; L = Matches lost;

==== Finals ====
===== Matches =====
1 April 2006
16h (UTC-3)

Grêmio	0–0	Internacional
	(pt)

Olímpico Stadium -Porto Alegre

18 March 2006
16h (UTC-3)

Internacional	1–1	Grêmio
Fernandão 57'	(pt)	Pedro Junior 78'

Beira-Rio Stadium -Porto Alegre

=== Copa Libertadores ===
==== Group stage ====
16 February 2006

Maracaibo	1–1	Internacional
Maldonado 88'	(pt)	Ceará 48'

Jose Pachencho Romero Stadium -Maracaibo

23 February 2006

Internacional	3–0	Nacional
Michel 20'; Fernandão 22'; Cardoso 88'	(pt)

Beira-Rio Stadium -Porto Alegre

8 March 2006

Pumas	1–2	Internacional
López 42'	(pt)	Rentería 63'; Fernandão 80'

Universitário Stadium -Ciudad de México

22 March 2006

Internacional	3–2	Pumas
Michel 37'; Fernandão 53'; Adriano 85'	(pt)	Galindo 3'; Botero 34'

Beira-Rio Stadium -Porto Alegre

4 April 2006

Nacional	0–0	Internacional
	(pt)

Parque Central Stadium -Montevideo

18 April 2006

Internacional	4–0	Maracaibo
Adriano 34'; Bolivar 77'; Michel 83'; Rentería 85'	(pt)

Beira-Rio Stadium -Porto Alegre

==== Round of 16 ====
27 April 2006

Nacional	1–2	Internacional
Vanzini 29'	(pt)	Wagner (45;+2); Rentería 63'

Parque Central Stadium -Montevideo

3 May 2006

Internacional	0–0	Nacional
	(pt)

Beira-Rio Stadium -Porto Alegre

==== Quarter-finals ====
10 May 2006

LDU	2–1	Internacional
Delgado 57'; Graziani 83'	(pt)	Wagner 25'

La Casa Blanca Stadium -Quito

19 July 2006

Internacional	2–0	LDU
Sóbis 51'; Rentería 87'	(pt)

Beira-Rio Stadium -Porto Alegre

==== Semi-finals ====
27 July 2006

Libertad	0–0	Internacional
	(pt)

Defensores Del Chaco Stadium -Asunción

3 August 2006

Internacional	2–0	Libertad
Alex 62'; Fernandão 67'	(pt)

Beira-Rio Stadium -Porto Alegre

==== Finals ====
9 August 2006

São Paulo	1–2	Internacional
Edcarlos 75'	(pt)	Sóbis 8' 16'

Morumbi Stadium -São Paulo

16 August 2006

Internacional	2–2	São Paulo
Fernandão 29'; Tinga 65'	(pt)	Fabão 50'; Lenílson 84'

Beira-Rio Stadium -Porto Alegre

=== Campeonato Brasileiro ===
==== Matches ====
15 April 2006
21h45 (UTC-3)

Vasco da Gama	1–1	Internacional
Abedi 73'	(pt)	Adriano 53'

São Januário Stadium -Rio de Janeiro

23 April 2006
16h (UTC-3)

Internacional	1–0	Santa Cruz
Rentería 46'	(pt)

Beira-Rio Stadium -Porto Alegre

30 April 2006
16h (UTC-3)

Internacional	1–0	Flamengo
Alex 28'	(pt)

Beira-Rio Stadium -Porto Alegre

7 May 2006
16h (UTC-3)

Atlético-PR	1–2	Internacional
Danilo 38'	(pt)	Rentería 19'; Jorge Wagner 80'

Arena da Baixada Stadium -Curitiba

14 May 2006
16h (UTC-3)

Internacional	3–1	São Paulo
Índio 13' 52'; Sóbis 60'	(pt)	Aloísio 47'

Beira-Rio Stadium -Porto Alegre

20 May 2006
18h10 (UTC-3)

Internacional	2–4	Figueirense
Fernandão 13'; Ceará 84'	(pt)	Schwenck 6' 30'; Cícero 54'; Tiago 81'

Beira-Rio Stadium -Porto Alegre

25 May 2006
21h45 (UTC-3)

Corinthians	0–1	Internacional
	(pt)	Tinga 12'

Morumbi Stadium -São Paulo

28 May 2006
16h (UTC-3)

Internacional	1–1	Cruzeiro
Índio 26'	(pt)	Edu Dracena 76'

Beira-Rio Stadium -Porto Alegre

31 May 2006
20h30 (UTC-3)

São Caetano	1–1	Internacional
Anderson Lima 15'	(pt)	Sóbis 41'

Anacleto Campanella Stadium - São Caetano

3 June 2006
16h (UTC-3)

Fluminense	2–3	Internacional
Jean 24'; Tuta 80'	(pt)	Iarley 27' 88'; Radamés 47'(o.g.)

Maracanã Stadium -Rio de Janeiro

12 July 2006
19h30 (UTC-3)

Internacional	2–0	Ponte Preta
Alex 26'; Ceará 63'	(pt)

Beira-Rio Stadium -Porto Alegre

16 July 2006
18h10 (UTC-3)

Juventude	2–0	Internacional
Fabrício 11'; Marcel (45;+1)	(pt)

Alfredo Jaconi Stadium -Caxias do Sul

23 July 2006
18h10 (UTC-3)

Internacional	0–0	Botafogo
	(pt)

Beira-Rio Stadium -Porto Alegre

30 July 2006
18h10 (UTC-3)

Internacional	0–0	Grêmio
	(pt)

Beira-Rio Stadium -Porto Alegre

6 August 2006
16h (UTC-3)

Santos	2–1	Internacional
Wendell 84' (90;+1)	(pt)	Iarley 9'

Vila Belmiro Stadium -Santos

13 August 2006
18h10 (UTC-3)

Fortaleza	1–2	Internacional
Alan 12'	(pt)	Leo 74'; Fabinho 88'

Castelão Stadium -Santos

20 August 2006
18h10 (UTC-3)

Internacional	1–1	Palmeiras
Sóbis 41'	(pt)	Paulo Baier 49'

Beira-Rio Stadium -Porto Alegre

23 August 2006
19h30 (UTC-3)

Goiás	2–2	Internacional
Fernandão 10' 63'	(pt)	Vitor 84'; Luciano Almeida 88'

Serra Dourada Stadium -Goiânia

20 August 2006
18h10 (UTC-3)

Internacional	1–2	Vasco da Gama
Iarley 17'	(pt)	Jorge Luiz 10'; Morais 67'

Beira-Rio Stadium -Porto Alegre

23 August 2006
19h30 (UTC-3)

Santa Cruz	0–2	Internacional
	(pt)	Fernandão 41'; Adriano 52'

Arruda Stadium -Recife

2 September 2006
16h (UTC-3)

Flamengo	1–2	Internacional
Obina 38'	(pt)	Fernandão 56', 59'

Maracanã Stadium -Rio de Janeiro

10 September 2006
19h30 (UTC-3)

Internacional	2–0	Atlético - PR
Adriano 5'; Eller 51'	(pt)

Beira-Rio Stadium -Porto Alegre

17 September 2006
16h (UTC-3)

São Paulo	2–0	Internacional
Lenilson 8' 70'	(pt)

Morumbi Stadium -São Paulo

20 September 2006
19h30 (UTC-3)

Figueirense	1–0	Internacional
Paraná 26'	(pt)

Orlando Scarpelli Stadium -Florianópolis

24 September 2006
16h (UTC-3)

Internacional	1–1	Corinthians
Fernandão 31'	(pt)	Carlos Alberto 30'

Beira-Rio Stadium -Porto Alegre

30 September 2006
16h (UTC-3)

Internacional	3–2	Paraná
Índio 9'; Eller 21' 31'	(pt)	Cristiano 76'; Sandro 89'

Beira-Rio Stadium -Porto Alegre

5 October 2006
19h30 (UTC-3)

Cruzeiro	2–1	Internacional
Wagner 33'; Ferreira 63'	(pt)	Ceará 45'

Mineirão Stadium -Belo Horizonte

8 October 2006
16h (UTC-3)

Internacional	1–0	São Caetano
Iarley 46'	(pt)

Beira-Rio Stadium -Porto Alegre

15 October 2006
16h (UTC-3)

Internacional	2–0	Fluminense
Iarley 36'; Michel 83'	(pt)

Beira-Rio Stadium -Porto Alegre

21 October 2006
19h30 (UTC-3)

Ponte Preta	0–2	Internacional
	(pt)	Eller 17'; Iarley 36'

Moisés Lucarelli Stadium -Campinas

26 October 2006
20h30 (UTC-3)

Internacional	1–0	Juventude
Alex 67'	(pt)

Beira-Rio Stadium -Porto Alegre

5 November 2006
16h (UTC-3)

Grêmio	0–1	Internacional
	(pt)	Iarley 64'

Olímpico Stadium -Porto Alegre

8 November 2006
21h45 (UTC-3)

Internacional	0–0	Santos
	(pt)

Beira-Rio Stadium -Porto Alegre

11 November 2006
18h10 (UTC-3)

Internacional	3–0	Fortaleza
Iarley 29'; Índio 38'; Alex 64'	(pt)

Beira-Rio Stadium -Porto Alegre

19 November 2006
16h (UTC-3)

Paraná	1–0	Internacional
Leonardo 5'	(pt)

Durival de Brito Stadium -Curitiba

26 November 2006
16h (UTC-3)

Palmeiras	1–4	Internacional
Eller 74'(o.g.)	(pt)	Pato 1'; Fernandão 4'; Daniel 33'(o.g.); Iarley 45'

Palestra Italia Stadium -São Paulo

2 December 2006
18h10 (UTC-3)

Internacional	1–4	Goiás
Eller 65'	(pt)	Welliton 20'; Luciano Almeida 40'; Romerito 54'; Cléber Gaúcho 59'

Beira-Rio Stadium -Porto Alegre

==== Classification ====
Pos	Club	Pld	W	D	L	F	A	GD	Pts
1	São Paulo	38	22	12	4	66	32	34	78
2	Internacional	38	20	9	9	52	36	16	69
3	Grêmio	38	20	7	11	64	45	19	67

==== Results summary ====
Overall								Home						Away					
Pld	W	D	L	GF	GA	GD	Pts	W	D	L	GF	GA	GD	W	D	L	GF	GA	GD
38	20	9	9	52	36	+16	69	10	6	3	26	16	+10	10	3	6	26	20	+6

Last updated: 1 January 2007.
Source: Campeonato Brasileiro 2006

Pld = Matches played; W = Matches won; D = Matches drawn; L = Matches lost;

=== Fifa World Club Cup ===
==== Semi-finals ====
13 December 2006

Al Ahly	1–2	Internacional
Flávio 53'	(pt)	Pato 22'; Luiz Adriano 71'

Olympic Stadium -Tokyo

==== Finals ====
17 December 2006

Internacional	1–0	Barcelona
Adriano 82'	(pt)

International Stadium -Yokohama
