= 2006 FIFA Club World Cup squads =

These are the squads for the 2006 FIFA Club World Cup, which was held in Japan from 10 December to 17 December 2006.

== Al Ahly ==
Head coach: (Portugal) Manuel José de Jesus

Note: Flags indicate national team as defined under FIFA eligibility rules; some limited exceptions apply. Players may hold more than one non-FIFA nationality.

No.	Pos.	Nation	Player
1	GK	EGY	Essam El-Hadary
2	DF	EGY	Islam El-Shater
3	MF	EGY	Tarek El-Said
4	DF	EGY	Emad El-Nahhas
5	DF	EGY	Ahmad El-Sayed
6	DF	EGY	Wael Gomaa
7	DF	EGY	Shady Mohamed
8	MF	EGY	Ahmad Sedik
9	FW	EGY	Emad Moteab
10	MF	EGY	Wael Riad
11	DF	EGY	Mohamed Abdullah
12	DF	EGY	Ahmad Shedid Qinawi
13	MF	EGY	Hossam Ashour
14	MF	EGY	Hassan Mostafa
15	DF	EGY	Abdulilah Galal
16	MF	GHA	Akwety Mensah
17	MF	EGY	Mohamed Shawky
18	FW	EGY	Osama Hosny
19	GK	EGY	Amir AbdulHamid
20	DF	EGY	Mohamed Sedik
21	GK	EGY	Nader El-Sayed
22	FW	EGY	Mohamed Aboutreika
23	FW	ANG	Flávio Amado

== Auckland City FC ==
Head coach: (England) Allan Jones

Note: Flags indicate national team as defined under FIFA eligibility rules; some limited exceptions apply. Players may hold more than one non-FIFA nationality.

No.	Pos.	Nation	Player
1	GK	NZL	Ross Nicholson
2	MF	NZL	Jason Hayne
3	DF	NZL	Ben Sigmund
4	MF	WAL	Paul Seaman
5	DF	NZL	Jonathan Perry
6	MF	ENG	Liam Mulrooney
7	DF	NZL	James Pritchett
8	MF	NZL	Jonathan Smith
9	FW	NZL	Paul Urlovic
10	FW	RSA	Grant Young
11	MF	ENG	Neil Sykes
12	GK	NZL	Richard Gillespie
13	DF	NZL	Cole Tinkler
14	FW	RSA	Keryn Jordan
15	DF	ENG	Dean Gordon
16	MF	JPN	Teruo Iwamoto
17	DF	NZL	Paul Vodanovich
18	DF	BRA	Luiz del Monte
19	MF	NZL	Chad Coombes
20	DF	NZL	Greg Uhlmann
21	DF	NZL	Riki van Steeden
22	MF	SCO	Bryan Little
23	GK	SCO	Mark Fulcher

== Club América ==
Head coach: (Mexico) Luis Fernando Tena

Note: Flags indicate national team as defined under FIFA eligibility rules; some limited exceptions apply. Players may hold more than one non-FIFA nationality.

No.	Pos.	Nation	Player
1	GK	MEX	Guillermo Ochoa
2	DF	MEX	Ismael Rodríguez
3	DF	MEX	José Antonio Castro
4	DF	MEX	Óscar Rojas
5	DF	MEX	Duilio Davino
6	DF	MEX	Diego Cervantes
7	FW	ARG	Claudio López
8	FW	ARG	Matías Vuoso
9	FW	PAR	Salvador Cabañas
10	MF	MEX	Cuauhtémoc Blanco
11	MF	BRA	Fabiano
12	GK	MEX	Alberto Becerra
13	MF	MEX	Juan Carlos Mosqueda
14	DF	MEX	Carlos Infante
15	DF	MEX	Raúl Salinas
16	DF	CHI	Ricardo Francisco Rojas
17	MF	MEX	Ignacio Torres
18	MF	MEX	Germán Villa
19	MF	MEX	Fabian Pena
20	MF	MEX	Alejandro Arguello
21	GK	MEX	Armando Navarrete
22	MF	MEX	Raúl Alvin Mendoza
23	FW	PAR	Nelson Cuevas

== FC Barcelona ==
Head coach: (Netherlands) Frank Rijkaard

Note: Flags indicate national team as defined under FIFA eligibility rules; some limited exceptions apply. Players may hold more than one non-FIFA nationality.

No.	Pos.	Nation	Player
1	GK	ESP	Víctor Valdés
2	DF	BRA	Juliano Belletti
3	MF	BRA	Thiago Motta
4	MF	MEX	Rafael Márquez
5	DF	ESP	Carles Puyol
6	MF	ESP	Xavi
7	FW	ISL	Eiður Guðjohnsen
8	FW	FRA	Ludovic Giuly
10	FW	BRA	Ronaldinho
11	DF	ITA	Gianluca Zambrotta
12	DF	NED	Gio van Bronckhorst
15	DF	BRA	Edmílson
16	DF	BRA	Sylvinho
18	FW	ESP	Santiago Ezquerro
20	MF	POR	Deco
21	DF	FRA	Lilian Thuram
22	FW	ARG	Javier Saviola
23	DF	ESP	Oleguer
24	MF	ESP	Andrés Iniesta
25	GK	ESP	Albert Jorquera
28	GK	ESP	Rubén
31	FW	MEX	Giovani dos Santos
32	MF	ESP	Marc Crosas

== Jeonbuk Hyundai Motors ==
Head coach: (South Korea) Choi Kang-Hee

Note: Flags indicate national team as defined under FIFA eligibility rules; some limited exceptions apply. Players may hold more than one non-FIFA nationality.

No.	Pos.	Nation	Player
1	GK	KOR	Lee Kwang-Suk
2	DF	KOR	Choi Chul-Soon
3	FW	KOR	Jung Soo-Jong
4	DF	KOR	Choi Jin-Cheul
5	DF	KOR	Kim Young-Sun
6	DF	KOR	Kim Hyun-Su
7	MF	KOR	Jang Ji-Hyun
8	MF	KOR	Chung Jung-Kwan
9	MF	KOR	Han Je-Kwang
10	MF	BRA	Raphael Botti
11	DF	KOR	Wang Jung-Hyun
12	MF	KOR	Jeon Kwang-Hwan
13	MF	KOR	Shin Sang-Hoon
14	MF	KOR	Lee Hyun-Seung
15	FW	BRA	Zé Carlos
16	DF	KOR	Lim You-Hwan
17	MF	KOR	Kim Young-Sin
18	DF	KOR	Heo Hoon-Goo
19	MF	KOR	Kwon Jip
20	DF	KOR	Kim In-Ho
21	GK	KOR	Kwoun Sun-Tae
22	MF	KOR	Kim Hyeung-Bum
23	GK	KOR	Sung Kyung-Il

== SC Internacional ==
Head coach: (Brazil) Abel Braga

Note: Flags indicate national team as defined under FIFA eligibility rules; some limited exceptions apply. Players may hold more than one non-FIFA nationality.

No.	Pos.	Nation	Player
1	GK	BRA	Clemer
2	DF	BRA	Ceará
3	DF	BRA	Índio
4	DF	BRA	Fabiano Eller
5	MF	BRA	Wellington Monteiro
6	DF	PER	Martín Hidalgo
7	MF	BRA	Alex
8	MF	BRA	Edinho
9	FW	BRA	Fernandão
10	FW	BRA	Iarley
11	FW	BRA	Alexandre Pato
12	GK	BRA	Renan
13	DF	BRA	Ediglê
14	MF	BRA	Fabinho
15	DF	BRA	Rubens Cardoso
16	MF	BRA	Adriano Gabiru
17	MF	COL	Fabián Vargas
18	FW	BRA	Luiz Adriano
19	FW	BRA	Léo Aro
20	MF	BRA	Perdigão
21	DF	BRA	Élder Granja
22	GK	BRA	Marcelo Boeck
23	FW	BRA	Michel
