= 2006 Copa Libertadores finals =

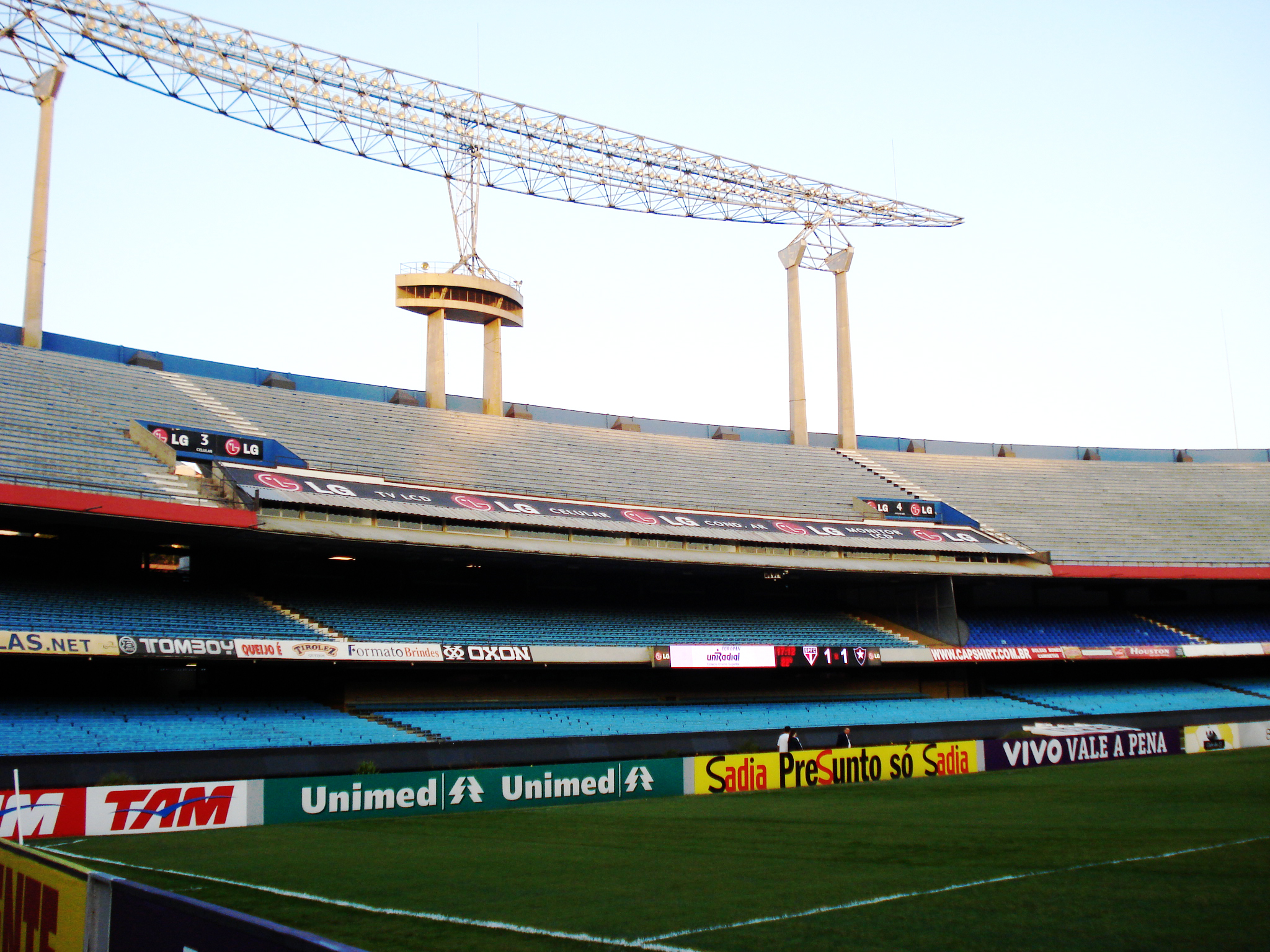
- Event: 2006 Copa Toyota Libertadores
São Paulo	Internacional
(Brazil)	(Brazil)
3	4
- on aggregate

First leg
São Paulo	Internacional
1	2
- Date: 9 August 2006
- Venue: Estádio do Morumbi, São Paulo
- Man of the Match: Rafael Sóbis
- Referee: Jorge Larrionda
- Attendance: 71,456

Second leg
Internacional	São Paulo
2	2
- Date: 16 August 2006
- Venue: Estádio Beira-Rio, Porto Alegre
- Man of the Match: Fernandão
- Referee: Horacio Elizondo
- Attendance: 55,000

The 2006 Copa Libertadores finals was a two-legged football match-up to determinethe winner of the 2006 Copa Libertadores, the 47th edition of the Copa Libertadores, South America's premier international club football tournament organized by CONMEBOL.

The finals were contested in a two-legged home-and-away format between Brazilian teams Internacional and São Paulo. The first leg was hosted by São Paulo at Estádio do Morumbi in São Paulo on 9 August 2006, while the second leg was hosted by Internacional at Estádio Beira-Rio in Porto Alegre on 16 August. The winner earned the right to represent CONMEBOL at the 2006 FIFA Club World Cup and to face the winners of the 2006 Copa Sudamericana in the 2007 Recopa Sudamericana.

Internacional won the first leg 2–1, and the second leg ended in a 2–2 draw, giving Internacional a 4–3 aggregate victory to claim their first Copa Libertadores title.

== Qualified teams ==
Team	Previous finals appearances (bold indicates winners)
(Brazil) São Paulo	1974, **1992**, **1993**, 1994, **2005**
(Brazil) Internacional	1980

== Venues ==
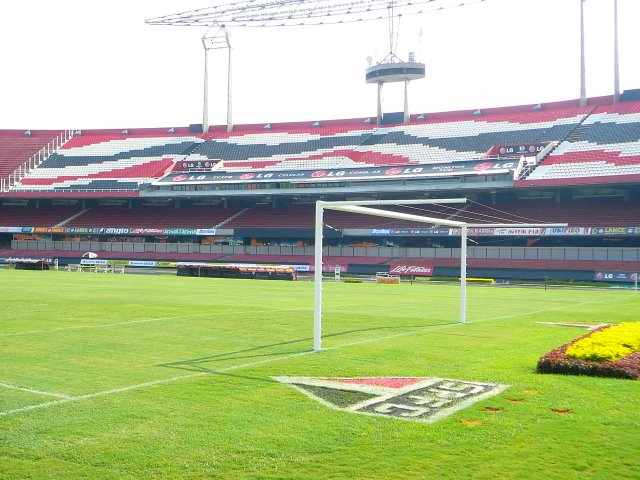
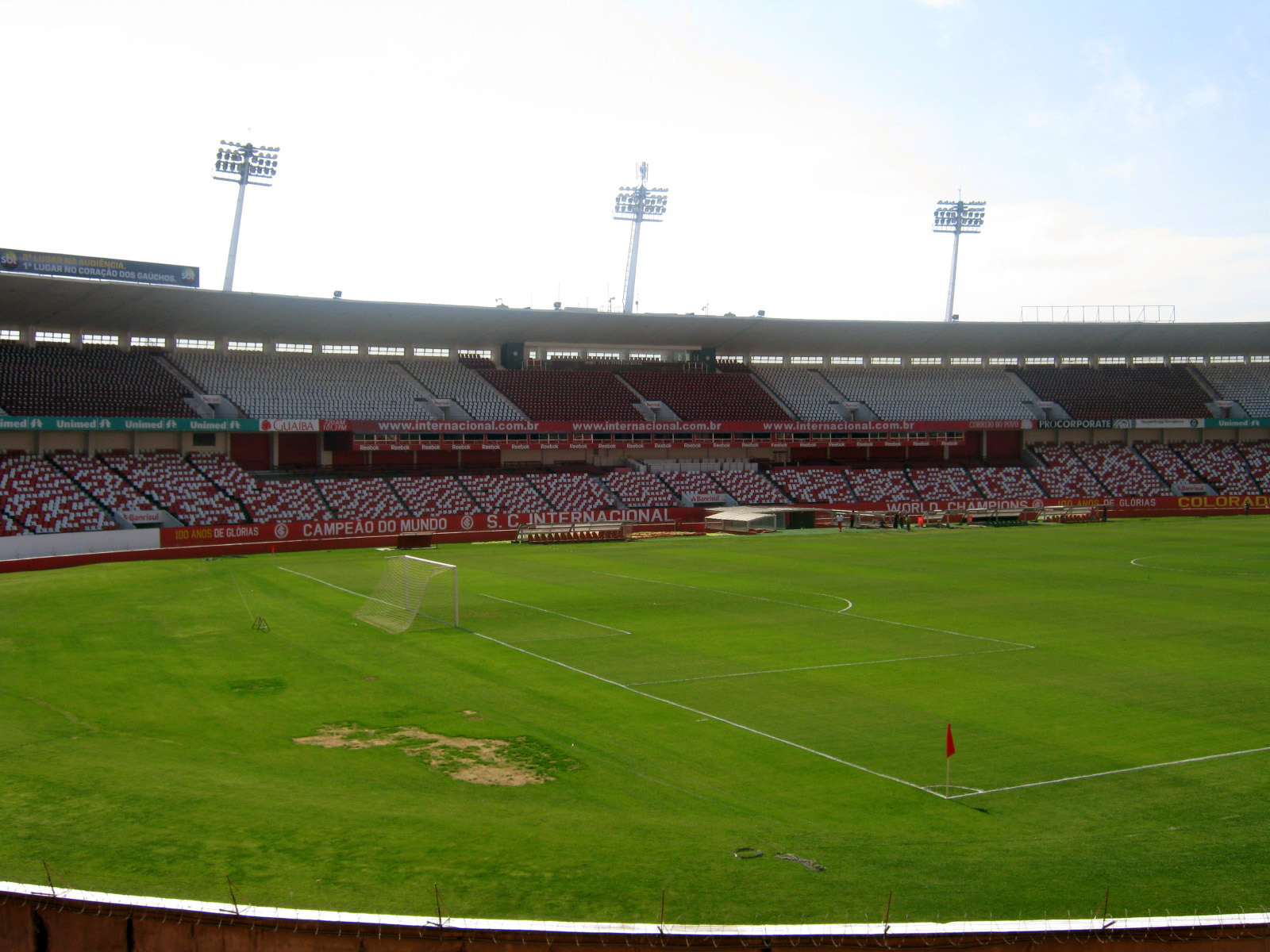
Estadio Morumbi (left) and Estadio Beira-Rio, venues for the series

== Route to the finals ==
Internacional			São Paulo	
(Uruguay) Nacional; A **2–1**	Jorge Wagner 45'; Wason Rentería 64'	**Round of 16**; First leg	(Brazil) Palmeiras; A **1–1**	Aloísio 23'
(Uruguay) Nacional; H **0–0**		Second leg	(Brazil) Palmeiras; H **2–1**	Aloísio 13'; Rogério Ceni (pen.) 86'
(Ecuador) LDU Quito; A **1–2**	Jorge Wagner 25'	**Quarterfinals**; First leg	(Argentina) Estudiantes; A **0–1**	
(Ecuador) LDU Quito; H **2–0**	Rafael Sóbis 52'; Wason Rentería 87'	Second leg	(Argentina) Estudiantes; H **1–0** (p. 4–3)	Edcarlos 44'
(Paraguay) Libertad; A **0–0**		**Semifinals**; First leg	(Mexico) Guadalajara; A **1–0**	Rogério Ceni (pen.) 84'
(Paraguay) Libertad; H **2–0**	Alex 62'; Fernandão 68'	Second leg	(Mexico) Guadalajara; H **3–0**	Leandro 32'; Mineiro 39'; Ricardo Oliveira 47'

== Match details ==
=== First leg ===
9 August 2006
21:45 (UTC-3)

São Paulo (Brazil)	1–2	(Brazil) Internacional
Edcarlos 75'	(Report)	Rafael Sóbis 53', 61'

Estádio Cícero Pompeu de Toledo (Morumbi), São Paulo
Attendance: 71,456
Referee: Jorge Larrionda (Uruguay)

**São Paulo**	**Internacional**

GK	1	(Brazil) Rogério Ceni (c)
CB	3	(Brazil) Fabão	(yellow card) 82'
CB	5	(Uruguay) Diego Lugano
CB	4	(Brazil) Edcarlos		(substituted off) 76'
RM	9	(Brazil) Leandro		(substituted off) 86'
CM	8	(Brazil) Josué	(red card) 9'
CM	7	(Brazil) Mineiro
LM	6	(Brazil) Júnior
AM	21	(Brazil) Souza	(yellow card) 55'
AM	10	(Brazil) Danilo		(substituted off) 63'
CF	12	(Brazil) Ricardo Oliveira
Substitutes:
GK	22	(Brazil) Bosco
FW	14	(Brazil) Aloísio		(substituted on) 76'
MF	16	(Brazil) Ilsinho
DF	18	(Brazil) Alex Silva
FW	19	(Brazil) Thiago Ribeiro
MF	20	(Brazil) Richarlyson		(substituted on) 83'
MF	23	(Brazil) Lenílson		(substituted on) 63'
Manager:
(Brazil) Muricy Ramalho

GK	1	(Brazil) Clemer
RB	5	(Brazil) Fabinho	(red card) 38'
CB	3	(Brazil) Bolívar
CB	4	(Brazil) Fabiano Eller
LB	15	(Brazil) Edinho
CM	14	(Brazil) Ceará		(substituted off) 56'
CM	7	(Brazil) Tinga
CM	23	(Brazil) Jorge Wagner
AM	24	(Brazil) Alex		(substituted off) 74'
CF	11	(Brazil) Rafael Sóbis		(substituted off) 78'
CF	9	(Brazil) Fernandão (c)
Substitutes:
GK	12	(Brazil) Marcelo Boeck
MF	8	(Brazil) Perdigão
DF	13	(Brazil) Índio		(substituted on) 74'
FW	10	(Brazil) Iarley
FW	18	(Brazil) Michel		(substituted on) 78'
FW	19	(Colombia) Wason Rentería
MF	21	(Brazil) Wellington Monteiro		(substituted on) 56'
Manager:
(Brazil) Abel Braga

Man of the Match:
(Brazil) Rafael Sóbis (Internacional)

Assistant referees:
(Uruguay) Pablo Fandiño
(Uruguay) Walter Rial
Fourth official:
(Uruguay) Martín Vázquez

=== Second leg ===
16 August 2006
22:00 (UTC-3)

Internacional (Brazil)	2–2	(Brazil) São Paulo
Fernandão 29'; Tinga 66'	(Report)	Fabão 50'; Lenílson 85'

Estádio José Pinheiro Borba (Beira-Rio), Porto Alegre
Attendance: 55,000
Referee: Horacio Elizondo (Argentina)

**Internacional**	**São Paulo**

GK	1	(Brazil) Clemer
RB	13	(Brazil) Índio
CB	3	(Brazil) Bolívar	(yellow card) 49'
CB	15	(Brazil) Edinho	(yellow card) 93'
LB	4	(Brazil) Fabiano Eller
CM	14	(Brazil) Ceará
CM	7	(Brazil) Tinga	(yellow card) 41' (yellow-red card) 66'
CM	23	(Brazil) Jorge Wagner	(yellow card) 5'
AM	24	(Brazil) Alex	(yellow card) 55'	(substituted off) 78'
CF	11	(Brazil) Rafael Sóbis		(substituted off) 82'
CF	9	(Brazil) Fernandão (c)	(yellow card) 3'
Substitutes:
GK	22	(Brazil) Renan
MF	8	(Brazil) Perdigão
FW	10	(Brazil) Iarley
DF	16	(Brazil) Ediglê		(substituted on) 82'
FW	18	(Brazil) Michel		(substituted on) 78'
FW	19	(Colombia) Wason Rentería
MF	25	(Brazil) Adriano Gabiru
Manager:
(Brazil) Abel Braga

GK	1	(Brazil) Rogério Ceni (c)
RB	3	(Brazil) Fabão	(yellow card) 82'
CB	5	(Uruguay) Diego Lugano
CB	7	(Brazil) Mineiro
LB	4	(Brazil) Edcarlos		(substituted off) 70'
RM	9	(Brazil) Leandro
CM	20	(Brazil) Richarlyson		(substituted off) 58'
LM	6	(Brazil) Júnior
AM	21	(Brazil) Souza	(yellow card) 55'
AM	10	(Brazil) Danilo		(substituted off) 58'
CF	14	(Brazil) Aloísio	(yellow card) 11'
Substitutes:
GK	22	(Brazil) Bosco
FW	11	(Brazil) Alex Dias		(substituted on) 70'
MF	13	(Brazil) Ramalho
MF	16	(Brazil) Ilsinho
DF	18	(Brazil) Alex Silva
FW	19	(Brazil) Thiago Ribeiro		(substituted on) 58'
MF	23	(Brazil) Lenílson		(substituted on) 58'
Manager:
(Brazil) Muricy Ramalho

Man of the Match:
(Brazil) Fernandão (Internacional)

Assistant referees:
(Argentina) Rodolfo Otero
(Argentina) Darío García
Fourth official:
(Argentina) Sergio Pezzotta
