= 2007 Recopa Sudamericana =

- Event: Recopa Sudamericana
Pachuca	Internacional
(Mexico)	(Brazil)
2	5
- (on aggregate)

First leg
Pachuca	Internacional
2	1
- Date: May 31, 2007
- Venue: Estadio Hidalgo, Pachuca
- Referee: Carlos Chandía (Chile)
- Attendance: 10,080

Second leg
Internacional	Pachuca
4	0
- Date: June 7, 2007
- Venue: Estádio Beira-Rio, Porto Alegre
- Referee: Sergio Pezzotta (Argentina)
- Attendance: 46,744

The 2007 Recopa Sudamericana (officially the 2007 Recopa Visa Sudamericana for sponsorship reasons) was the 15th Recopa Sudamericana, an annual football match between the winners of the previous season's Copa Libertadores and Copa Sudamericana competitions.

The match was contested by Internacional, winners of the 2006 Copa Libertadores, and Pachuca, winners of the 2006 Copa Sudamericana. Internacional defeated Pachuca 5–2 on aggregate and became new champions of the competition.

== Qualified teams ==
Team	Previous finals app.
(Mexico) Pachuca	None
(Brazil) Internacional	None

Bold indicates winning years

== Venues ==
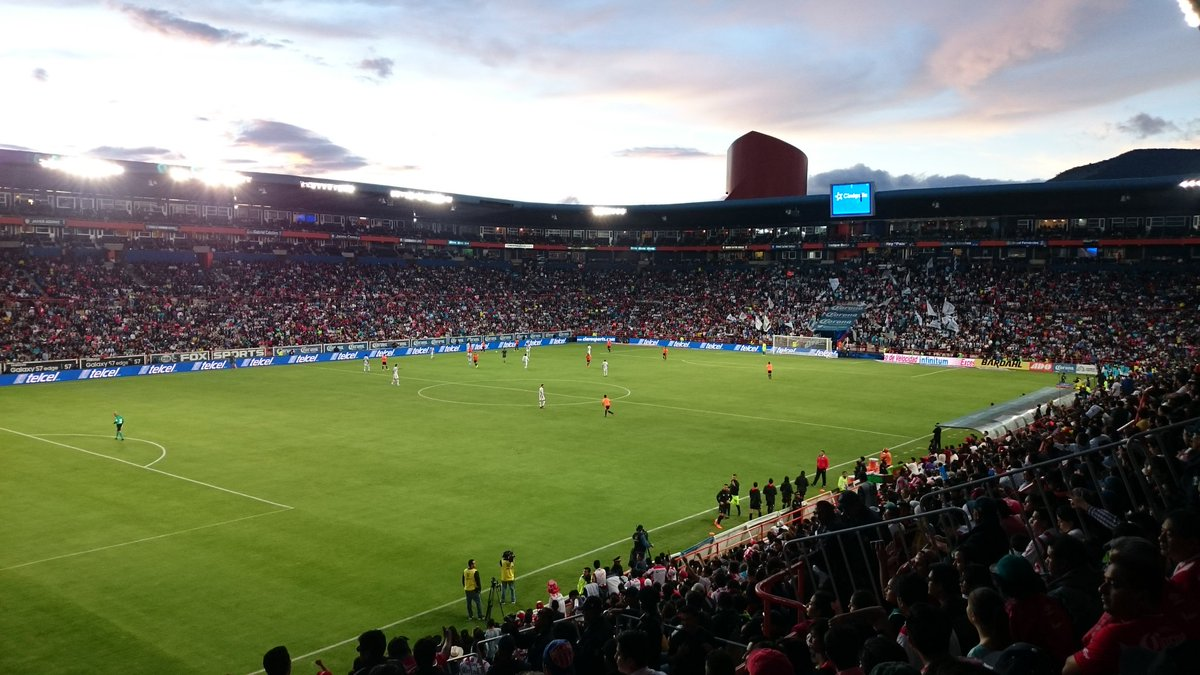
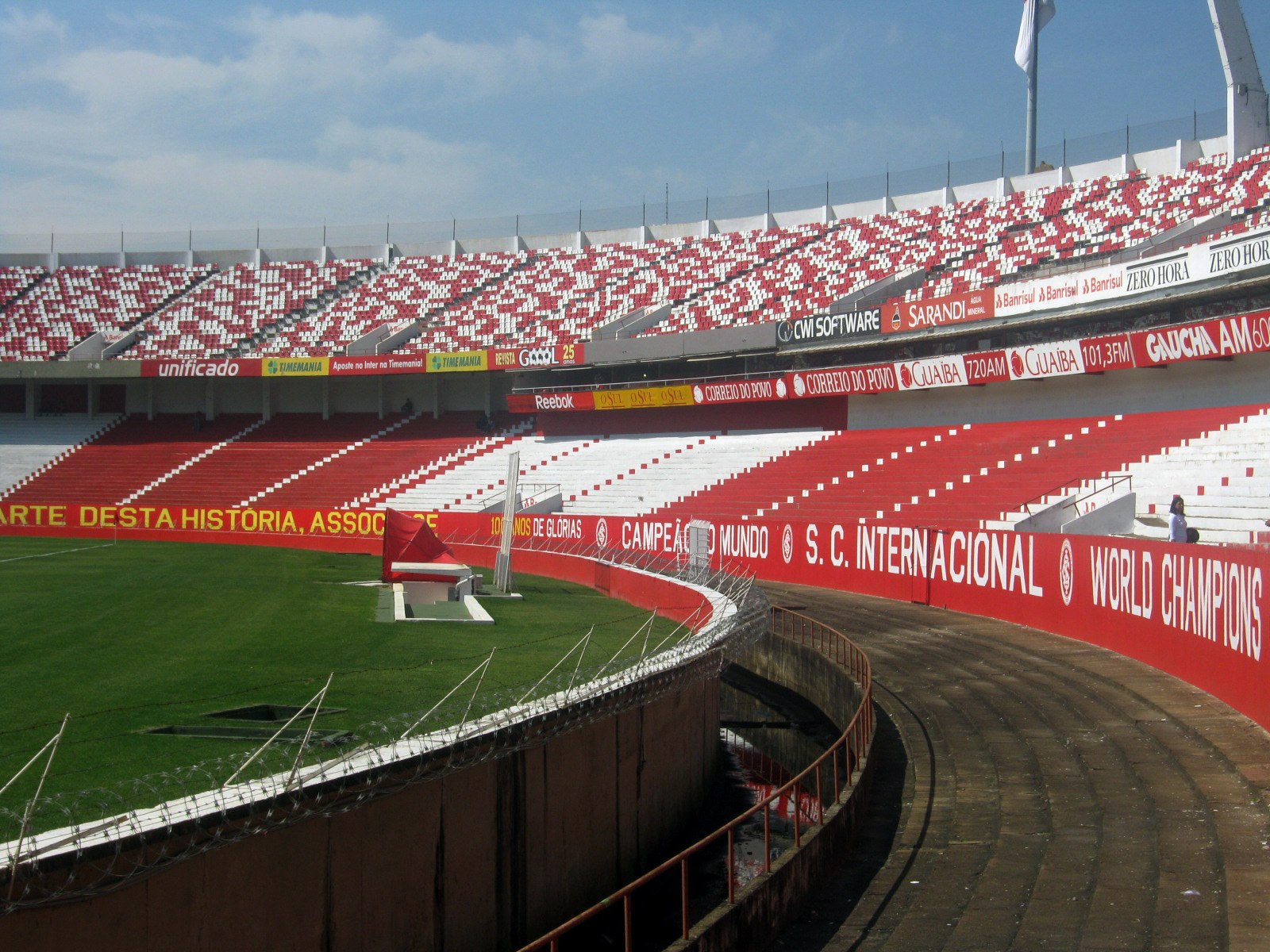
Estadio Hidalgo (left) and Beira-Rio, venues of the series

== Matches ==
=== First leg ===
2007 Recopa Sudamericana
May 31, 2007
21:30 (UTC−06)
First leg

Pachuca (Mexico)	2–1	(Brazil) Internacional
Giménez 16', 79'	Report	Pato 4'

Estadio Hidalgo, Pachuca
Attendance: 10,080
Referee: Carlos Chandía (Chile)

**Pachuca**	**Internacional**

GK	1	(Colombia) Miguel Calero **(C)**
DF	2	(Mexico) Leobardo López
DF	3	(Colombia) Aquivaldo Mosquera	(yellow card) 40'
DF	21	(Mexico) Fausto Pinto	(yellow card) 83'
DF	22	(Mexico) Paul Aguilar
MF	6	(Mexico) Jaime Correa	(substituted off) 55a'
MF	8	(Mexico) Gabriel Caballero
MF	7	(Argentina) Damián Álvarez
MF	13	(Mexico) Fernando Salazar
FW	19	(Argentina) Christian Giménez	(substituted off) 85'
FW	6	(Mexico) Luis Ángel Landín	(yellow card) 30' (substituted off) 55b'
Substitutes:
MF	16	(Mexico) Carlos Gerardo Rodríguez	(substituted on) 55a'
FW	11	(Mexico) Juan Carlos Cacho	(substituted on) 55b'
FW	17	(Mexico) Omar Arellano	(substituted on) 85'
Manager:
(Mexico) Enrique Meza

GK	12	(Brazil) Clemer
DF	2	(Brazil) Ceará
DF	13	(Brazil) Sidnei
DF	6	(Brazil) Mineiro	(yellow card) 60'
DF	23	(Brazil) Rubens Cardoso
MF	8	(Brazil) Edinho	(yellow card) 68'
MF	5	(Brazil) Wellington Monteiro	(yellow card) 21'
MF	17	(Brazil) Maycon
MF	21	(Brazil) Pinga	(substituted off) 80'
FW	9	(Brazil) Fernandão **(C)**	(substituted off) 77'
FW	11	(Brazil) Alexandre Pato	(substituted off) 61'
Substitutes:
FW	10	(Brazil) Iarley	(substituted on) 61'
FW	18	(Brazil) Christian	(substituted on) 77'
MF	16	(Brazil) Perdigão	(substituted on) 80'
Manager:
(Brazil) Alexandre Gallo

Assistant referees:
(Chile) Lorenzo Acuña
(Chile) Manuel Rodríguez

=== Second leg ===
June 7, 2007
21:50 (UTC-3)
Second leg

Internacional (Brazil)	4–0	(Mexico) Pachuca
Alex 30' (pen.); Pinga 50'; Pato 64'; Mosquera 77' (o.g.)	Report

Estádio Beira-Rio, Porto Alegre
Attendance: 46,744
Referee: Sergio Pezzotta (Argentina)

**Internacional**	**Pachuca**

GK	12	(Brazil) Clemer
DF	2	(Brazil) Ceará
DF	3	(Brazil) Índio
DF	13	(Brazil) Sidnei	(yellow card) 62'	(substituted off) 80'
DF	23	(Brazil) Rubens Cardoso	(yellow card) 40'	(substituted off) 64'
MF	8	(Brazil) Edinho **(C)**
MF	5	(Brazil) Wellington Monteiro
MF	15	(Brazil) Alex	(yellow card) 58'
MF	21	(Brazil) Pinga		(substituted off) 84'
FW	10	(Brazil) Iarley	(yellow card) 45'
FW	11	(Brazil) Alexandre Pato
Substitutes:
FW	17	(Brazil) Maycon		(substituted on) 64'
DF	6	(Brazil) Mineiro		(substituted on) 80'
MF	16	(Brazil) Perdigão		(substituted on) 84'
Manager:
(Brazil) Alexandre Gallo

GK	1	(Colombia) Miguel Calero **(C)**
DF	2	(Mexico) Leobardo López
DF	3	(Colombia) Aquivaldo Mosquera
DF	21	(Mexico) Fausto Pinto	Sent off (straight red)
MF	14	(Mexico) Marvin Cabrera		(substituted off) 79'
MF	6	(Mexico) Jaime Correa
MF	8	(Mexico) Gabriel Caballero
MF	10	(Colombia) Andrés Chitiva		(substituted off) 60'
MF	13	(Mexico) Fernando Salazar		(substituted off) 46'
FW	19	(Argentina) Christian Giménez
FW	11	(Mexico) Juan Carlos Cacho
Substitutes:
MF	7	(Argentina) Damián Álvarez		(substituted on) 46'
FW	9	(Mexico) Luis Ángel Landín		(substituted on) 60'
FW	16	(Mexico) Carlos Gerardo Rodríguez		(substituted on) 79'
Manager:
(Mexico) Enrique Meza

Assistant referees:
(Argentina) Ricardo Casas
(Argentina) Wálter Vélaz
