= Chiquinho =

Chiquinho is a nickname for Francisco (Francis) in Portuguese speaking countries, and may refer to the following:

- Chiquinho Carlos (born 1963), Brazilian-born footballer who played in the Portuguese leagues in the 1980s and 1990s
- Chiquinho Conde (born 1965), Mozambican footballer
- Chiquinho (footballer, born 1974), Brazilian footballer
- Chiquinho (footballer, born 1980), Portuguese footballer
- Chiquinho (footballer, born 1983), Brazilian footballer
- Chiquinho (footballer, born 1989), Brazilian footballer
- Chiquinho (footballer, born 1995), Portuguese footballer
- Chiquinho (footballer, born 2000), Portuguese footballer
- Chiquinho (novel), a 1947 novel published by Baltasar Lopes da Silva
