= Márcio Mossoró =

Brazilian footballer

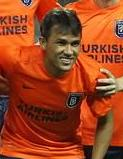
- Mossoró with İstanbul Başakşehir in 2016

Personal information
- Full name: José Márcio da Costa
- Date of birth: 4 July 1983 (age 43)
- Place of birth: Mossoró, Brazil
- Height: 1.70 m (5 ft 7 in)
- Position: Midfielder

Youth career
- 1999–2001: Ferroviário

Senior career*
Years	Team	Apps	(Gls)
2002	Santa Catarina		
2003–2005	Paulista	18	(3)
2005–2008	Internacional	32	(1)
2007–2008	→ Marítimo (loan)	30	(7)
2008–2013	Braga	124	(13)
2013–2014	Al-Ahli	24	(6)
2014–2019	İstanbul Başakşehir	150	(19)
2019–2021	Göztepe	39	(2)
2021	Altay	16	(0)
2022	América-RN	2	(0)
2022–2023	Potiguar Mossoró	21	(3)
Total		456	(54)
- * Club domestic league appearances and goals

José Márcio da Costa (born 4 July 1983), known as Márcio Mossoró, is a Brazilian former professional footballer who played as a midfielder.

His nickname stemmed for his birthplace. He spent most of his extensive career in Portugal, representing mainly Braga where he appeared in 175 official matches over five seasons. In 2014 he signed with İstanbul Başakşehir from Turkey, where he also endured a lengthy spell.

== Club career ==
Born in Mossoró, Rio Grande do Norte, Mossoró began his professional career at Ferroviário Atlético Clube (CE) in 1999, before moving to Santa Catarina Clube and then Paulista Futebol Clube. Shortly after, he broke into the first team, and helped to qualification for the final of the Campeonato Paulista, being defeated by Associação Desportiva São Caetano.

In 2005, Mossoró played a key role for the side as they won the Copa do Brasil. He was then transferred to Sport Club Internacional of Porto Alegre for the second half of the season, making his Série A debut in the process.

Mossoró was loaned to C.S. Marítimo of Portugal in July 2007. His performances, which included braces in Primeira Liga wins against Associação Naval 1º de Maio (3–0) and S.C. Braga (4–1) were impressive enough to earn him a permanent €1 million deal with the latter club, which signed the player to a four-year contract at the end of the campaign.

During his first two years, Mossoró was a very important first-team member when available, helping the Minho side to finish a best-ever runner-up in 2009–10. Following a 31 October 2009 scuffle at the end of the 2–0 home win against S.L. Benfica – with his team then in the lead – he was suspended for three games and also suffered a serious injury in the final stretch, with Braga eventually being surpassed in the table by that opponent.

Mossoró left the Estádio Municipal de Braga in June 2013, aged 30. Subsequently, he represented Al-Ahli SC (Jeddah), İstanbul Başakşehir F.K. and Göztepe SK, with the last two clubs hailing from the Turkish Süper Lig; in that nation, he also appeared for TFF First League's Altay SK, achieving promotion in his only season.

== Honours ==
Paulista

- Copa do Brasil: 2005

Internacional

- Copa Libertadores: 2006
- Recopa Sudamericana: 2007

Braga

- Taça da Liga: 2012–13
- UEFA Europa League runner-up: 2010–11
