= Léo Aro =

Brazilian footballer

Personal information
- Full name: Leonardo Augusto Gomes Aro
- Date of birth: 14 December 1983 (age 42)
- Place of birth: Jundiaí, Brazil
- Height: 1.77 m (5 ft 10 in)
- Position: Winger

Youth career
- 1999–2000: Guarani

Senior career*
Years	Team	Apps	(Gls)
2001–2005	Guarani	36	(6)
2003	→ Botafogo (loan)		
2003	→ Juventude (loan)	4	(0)
2005	Paulista		
2006–2009	Internacional	22	(8)
2007	→ Figueirense (loan)	3	(0)
2008–2009	→ Lecce (loan)	0	(0)
2009	Paulista	13	(2)
2009–2010	Leixões	11	(1)
2011	Comercial-SP	9	(1)
2012	Marilia	19	(2)
2012–2013	Esportivo	11	(1)
2013	Bragantino-SP	7	(0)
2014	Guarani	4	(0)
2016	Inter de Limeira	10	(1)
2017	Taubaté	9	(1)
- * Club domestic league appearances and goals

Leonardo Augusto Gomes Aro (born 14 December 1983), known as Léo Aro, is a Brazilian former professional footballer who played as a winger.

== Career ==
A Guarani youth product, Léo Aro was coached by Evaristo Piza's father at the club. He scored on his senior debut for Guarani against Corinthians. In 2005, he won the Copa do Brasil with Paulista, also scoring in the final against Fluminense. Having signed for Internacional in 2006, he was part of the squad that won the 2006 Copa Libertadores and the 2006 FIFA Club World Cup. He was not initially included in Internacional's 23-man squad for the FIFA Club World Cup but was called up by coach Abel Braga after Colombian forward Wason Rentería sustained an injury. Also at Internacional, Léo Aro considered teammate Fernandão a father figure.

He spent time abroad in Europe in 2009 and 2010, with Italian club Lecce and Portuguese side Leixões. At both clubs, he played little, making three and 13 appearances, respectively.

In 2011 Léo Aro returned to Brazil with Comercial-SP, going on to play for lower-league sides such as Marilia and Bragantino-SP. He re-joined former club Guarani in 2014, making few appearances.

He played for Inter de Limeira in the first half of the 2016 season. On 28 December 2016, Taubaté, coached by Evaristo Piza, announced Léo Aro would join the club for the 2017 season in Campeonato Paulista Série A2. He was Taubaté's first signing for the 2017 season. He left the club in April 2017, having made his last appearance on 15 April 2017 in a 3–2 win over São Caetano, and subsequently retired from playing.

== Style of play ==
"A fast and technically gifted player", Léo Aro's preferred playing position was winger but he could also play as a centre-forward. In 2018, after Léo Aro's retirement, Ge.globo's journalist Luiz Felipe Longo stated that Léo Aro's career had been "far less brilliant than expected".

== Post-playing career ==
After his retirement from playing Léo Aro studied to become a fitness coach and had an internship with Ponte Preta's amputee football team. He had started a physical education course in 2002, while at Guarani, which he interrupted in favour of his playing career. In 2020, he said he had completed his degree in physical education in 2018.

== Personal life ==
Léo Aro has a son, who in August 2018 was ten years old.

== Honours ==
Paulista

- Copa do Brasil: 2005

Internacional

- FIFA Club World Cup: 2006
- Copa Libertadores: 2006
