= Daniel Marques (Brazilian footballer) =

Brazilian footballer (born 1983)

Personal information
- Full name: Daniel Marques Silva
- Date of birth: July 11, 1983 (age 43)
- Place of birth: Jaú-SP, Brazil
- Height: 1.90 m (6 ft 3 in)
- Position: Central defender

Team information
- Current team: Resende

Youth career
- 2000–2002: XV de Jaú

Senior career*
Years	Team	Apps	(Gls)
2003	Ituano		
2003–2005	Palmeiras		
2004	→ Ituano (loan)		
2004	→ América-SP (loan)		
2005	→ Cianorte (loan)		
2005	→ Paraná (loan)		
2006	Internacional		
2006	Atlético Mineiro		
2007–2008	Paraná		
2008–2010	Grêmio Barueri		
2010	Atlético Goianiense		
2011	Mirassol		
2011	Grêmio Barueri		
2011–2012	Ceará		
2013	São Bernardo		
2013	CRB		
2014	Treze		
2014–2016	CRB		
2016	URT		
2017	Formosa		
2018–	Resende		
- * Club domestic league appearances and goals as of 26 April 2016

Daniel Marques Silva (born July 11, 1983), or simply Daniel Marques, is a Brazilian football central defender, who plays for Resende.

== Career ==
Daniel Marques started his professional career with Ituano in 2003, his spell with Ituano was short lived as he left to join Palmeiras in 2003. He remained a Palmeiras player until 2005, during his time there he was part of the 2003 Campeonato Brasileiro Série B winning squad. Although, his spell with Palmeiras was littered with loan spells to four different clubs. First came a move to former club Ituano, then loans to América, Cianorte and Paraná (with whom he made 38 appearances and scored twice) followed. 2006 saw unsuccessful moves to Internacional and Atlético Mineiro (2006 Série B winners) before Daniel Marques joined most recent loan club Paraná on a full-time basis, this time around he made 24 appearances without scoring for the Curitiba-based club.

He moved to Barueri next where he remained for two seasons, he participated in 41 matches and scored two goals. Atlético Goianiense became Daniel Marques' ninth different club in 2010, he played a part in 20 matches for the club. A short spell with Mirassol followed before a move back to Barueri in 2011. Next came his most successful period at a club to date when he signed for Ceará, he made over 50 appearances and scored five times for the club over two seasons before departing to join São Bernardo. After seven appearances for São Bernardo, he agreed to join CRB where he played ten times before leaving to go to Treze until returning to CRB in months later. On 15 December 2015, it was announced that he would join URT.

== Honours ==
Ituano

- Campeonato Brasileiro Série C (1): 2003

Palmeiras

- Campeonato Brasileiro Série B (1): 2003

Paraná

- Campeonato Paranaense (1): 2006

Atlético Mineiro

- Campeonato Brasileiro Série B (1): 2006

Barueri

- Campeonato Paulista do Interior (1): 2008

Atlético Goianiense

- Campeonato Goiano (1): 2010

Ceará

- Campeonato Cearense (2): 2011, 2012

São Bernardo

- Copa Paulista (1): 2013

CRB

- Campeonato Alagoano (2): 2013, 2015
