= Gustavo Papa =

Brazilian footballer (born 1979)

Personal information
- Full name: Gustavo Saibt Martins
- Date of birth: July 20, 1979 (age 47)
- Place of birth: Gravataí Brazil
- Height: 1.86 m (6 ft 1 in)
- Position: Striker

Team information
- Current team: Caxias (assistant)

Youth career
- 1995–1998: Grêmio

Senior career*
Years	Team	Apps	(Gls)
1998–1999	Grêmio		
1999	São Luiz		
2000	Inter de Santa Maria	3	(0)
2001	Grêmio Bagé	8	(4)
2002	São Gabriel	25	(13)
2002	Landskrona BoIS		
2003	Juventude	18	(2)
2004	Ulbra	13	(9)
2005	Glória	14	(6)
2005–2006	Internacional	18	(3)
2006–2007	→ São Caetano (loan)	13	(3)
2007	Coritiba	25	(7)
2008	Wuhan Guanggu		
2009	Brasiliense	21	(5)
2010–2011	Novo Hamburgo	30	(4)
2010	→ Chapecoense (loan)	2	(0)
2011	Fortaleza	2	(1)
2012	Anapolina	1	(0)
2012–2017	Brasil de Pelotas	90	(11)

Managerial career
- 2018–2019: Brasil de Pelotas (assistant)
- 2019: Brasil de Pelotas (interim)
- 2020: Brasil de Pelotas
- 2021: Esportivo
- 2022–: Caxias (assistant)
- * Club domestic league appearances and goals

Gustavo Saibt Martins (born 20 July 1979), known as Gustavo Papa or simply Gustavo, is a Brazilian football manager and former player who played as a striker. He is the current assistant manager of Caxias.

== Playing career ==
Gustavo played for Juventude, Internacional and São Caetano in the Campeonato Brasileiro Série A. He also played for Wuhan Guanggu in the Chinese first division.

== Honours ==
Coritiba

- Campeonato Brasileiro Série B: 2007

Brasil de Pelotas

- Campeonato Gaúcho Second Division: 2013
