= Ceará (footballer) =

Brazilian footballer (born 1980)

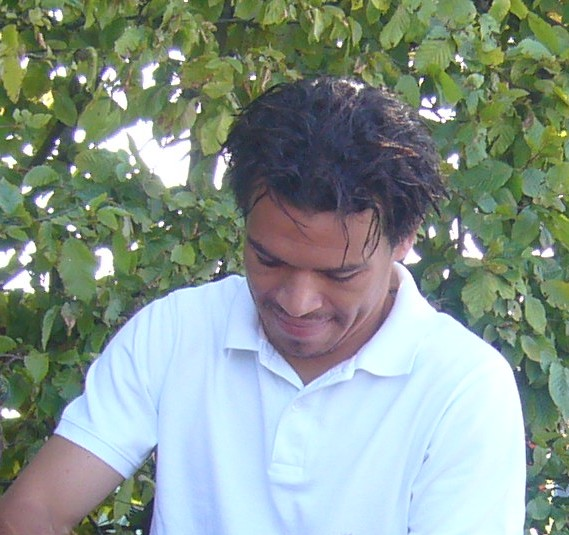
- Ceará in 2008.

Personal information
- Full name: Marcos Venâncio de Albuquerque
- Date of birth: 16 June 1980 (age 46)
- Place of birth: Crato, Brazil
- Height: 1.75 m (5 ft 9 in)
- Position: Right wing back

Youth career
- 1999: Gama

Senior career*
Years	Team	Apps	(Gls)
1999	Santos	4	(0)
2000	→ Portuguesa Santista (loan)	0	(0)
2000	São José	0	(0)
2001	Santa Cruz	19	(0)
2002	Botafogo	0	(0)
2002–2003	Coritiba	32	(1)
2004–2005	São Caetano	26	(1)
2005–2007	Internacional	55	(3)
2007–2012	Paris Saint-Germain	140	(2)
2010	Paris Saint-Germain B	1	(0)
2012–2015	Cruzeiro	82	(2)
2016	Coritiba	6	(0)
2016–2017	Internacional	13	(0)
2017	América-MG	5	(0)
- * Club domestic league appearances and goals as of 23 December 2017

Marcos Venâncio de Albuquerque (born 16 June 1980), commonly known as Ceará, is a Brazilian right wingback.

== Career ==
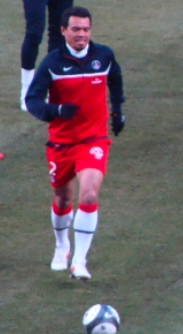
Ceará during training before match preparation with PSG

Ceará began his football career in the city of Crato in the state where Ceará was born. Ceará began his football career when he joined Gama youth academy and earned a nickname Ceará. In 1999, he joined Brazilian side Santos where he spent one year and then joined various Brazilian clubs in the lower division like Associação Atlética Portuguesa and São José. In 2001, Ceará joined Santa Cruz where the club became 25th place in Campeonato Brasileiro Série A, which resulted relegation to Campeonato Brasileiro Série B. At Santa Cruz, he made 19 league appearances. The following year, he joined Botafogo where he played against Sport Club do Recife in the Brazil Cup which resulted 1–1 draw. In the second leg, Sport Club do Recife won 7–2 to go through to the next round.

Ceará career changed when he joined Coritiba where he stayws for two years. In 2003, Ceará and his teammate led the Coritiba win the Campeonato Paranaense and finished fifth in the league.

=== São Caetano ===
In 2004, Ceará joined Associação Desportiva São Caetano. At São Caetano, Ceará broke into the first team and the club was able to achieve success when they won Campeonato Paulista. In the same season, Ceará was the skilled defensive player who has been increasingly used at the time as well as left-right-back, making 26 appearances and scoring 1. The club was able to win the moment a major trophy in club history, Campeonato Paulista. This was the peak of the team, thereafter the results are in decline, especially after the deprivation of São Caetano points due to the death of Serginho who collapsed in the field in a match against São Paulo on 27 October 2004.

=== Internacional ===
In 2005, Ceará moved again but this joined Sport Club Internacional where he had a successful season. On 25 June 2005, Ceará made his debut for the club against São Paulo, which the club later was a success winning the FIFA Club World Championship. Came up to the end of the season, Ceará made 13 appearances and the club won the Campeonato Gaúcho in the same year. In the league, Internacional placed in second behind first place Corinthians, just three points adrift.

In 2006, Ceará wore number shirt 14 at Internacional and the club was more successful for the club when they won their first title in Copa Libertadores final beating São Paulo 4–3 on aggregate where he played in both legs, playing in the right back position. In the first leg, Ceará was replaced by Wellington Monteiro in the 56th minute but played in the decisive second leg of the full playing time. With winning the Copa Libertadores, the club participate in the FIFA Club World Cup at Japan. At the FIFA Club World Cup, the club started in the semi-final against Egyptian side Al Ahly where they won 2–1 to progress to the final. In the final, Ceará made a name for himself at Sport Club Internacional, where he was part of the side that famously beat F.C. Barcelona to win the 2006 FIFA Club World Championship where he played in the right back position. Ceará also acted as a regular force also in the defensive line from Internacional. He was made up of 31 league matches and scored three goals. Once again in the league, the club placed in second behind São Paulo with nine points adrift.

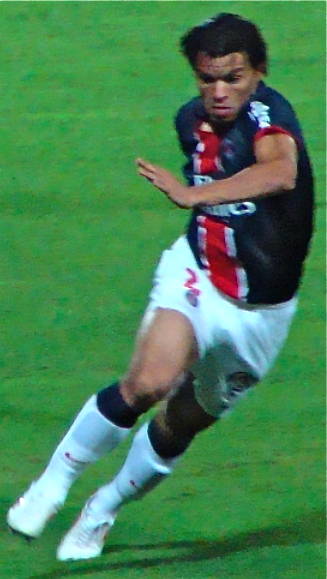
Ceará in a match against Lille.

In 2007, the club was not able to achieve winning a cup but did won the Recopa Sudamericana by beating Mexican side Pachuca 5–2 on aggregate where he played in both legs, playing in the right back position. Ceará was still a regular place as he made ten league games (+ 1 goal) before he took shortly after a shift to Europe. In total at Internacional, Ceará made 55 appearances and scoring 4 where he frequently struck by his defense actions and by his appearance in the Copa Libertadores and the FIFA Club World Cup and international organizations to gain attention. Ceará signed a new deal with Internacional until 2011.

=== Paris Saint-Germain ===
His performances in the FIFA Club World Cup attracted the attention of French side Paris Saint-Germain, who brought him to the French capital in the summer of 2007, for R$6,752,750 and keeping him until 2010. Ceará made his debut for the club, coming on as substitute after 84 minutes for Amara Diané in a match against AS Monaco which PSG won 2–1 on 16 September 2007. The next game on 6 October 2007, Ceará scored his goal for the club in a 3–1 loss against Stade Rennais. On 15 March 2008, Ceará scored an own goal in a 1–1 against Valenciennes which PSG were losing until Pauleta equalizer give both clubs a draw. In his first season, Ceara struggled to find his best form, and made a few high-profile mistakes that contributed to a poor campaign for his club. In the Coupe de la Ligue Final, Ceará played in the right back as PSG won the Coupe de la Ligue for third time against Lens 2–1 with a winning goal from substitute Bernard Mendy on stoppage time.

As from 2008 to 2009, the Brazilian's displays improved and he's since considered as one of the most reliable performers in the squad, where he made almost every league game remained scoreless, but this year, but made with four assists, twice as many as they did in previous season and also support and agreement field with Ludovic Giulyband Stéphane Sessègnon. He also involved in UEFA Cup where he provided 3 assist in 9 UEFA Cup before losing to Ukrainian side Dynamo Kyiv 3–0. What made it worse when PSG became sixth place which resulted missing out on Europa League qualification or play-off-grid positions and didn't win either Coupe de France (eliminated in Round of 16) and Coupe de la Ligue (eliminated in semi-final), without winning a single title.

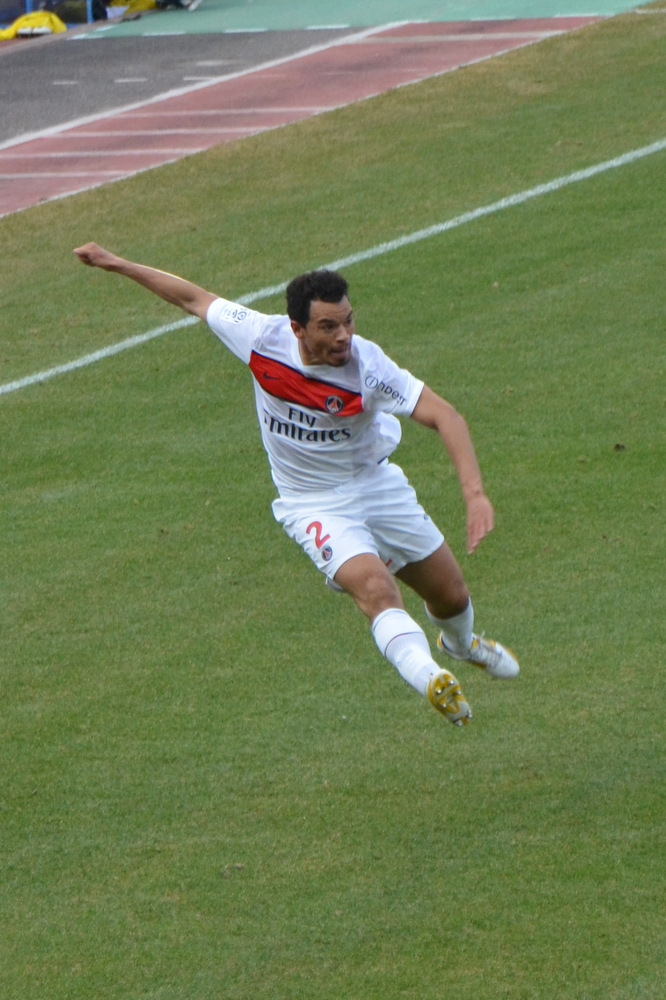
Ceará in actions against Dijon on 11 March 2012.

The following season in 2009/10, the club appointed a new manager Antoine Kombouaré after Paul Le Guen left due to expiry of his contract. Prior the season started, Ceará signed a new contract at PSG until 2012 as his contract was to expire next summer. Ceará find himself in spite of the arrival of competitor Christophe Jallet in the summer of 2009 and face competition with Jallet whether who take the right back position. At the start of the season, Ceará played a few games due to injury. Later on the season, Ceará made more appearance in the season. By the end of the season, Ceará made 29 appearances and 1 assist when he set up a goal for Jérémy Clément to score the only goal in a match against Auxerre on 28 November 2009. The team became thirteen place which the club briefly represented in the relegation battle. Despite bad performance in the league, Ceará was on the bench for the final until he come on for Mevlüt Erdinç on 105 minutes as PSG won the Coupe de France for the eighth time in a 1–0 against AS Monaco, thanks to Guillaume Hoarau who scored a winning goal in extra time. Despite the Coupe de France, the club also participate in Emirates Cup (which they became second) and Trophée des Champions where they lose to Le Classique rival Olympique de Marseille on penalties following Ludovic Giuly missed and Édouard Cissé struck the winning penalty to win the cup.

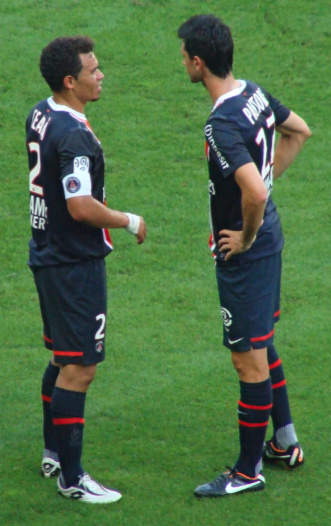
Ceará (captain) and Javier Pastore.

The following season in 2010/11, Ceará suffered a performance hit following initially good phase which goes back including an injury he suffered in its early phase of the new season. After initially always acted on the full playing time, he also worked to recover from injury to join the team as a regular force, which he did sometimes. But even after it had returned to the team found, he was only partly to do sporadic occasions in February 2011 and was only used as a substitute for a few minutes. Its so far (as of 30 March 2011) last championship when he joined on 27 February 2011 with a 2–1 home victory over Toulouse. In November 2010, Ceará had to have a nose surgery after being elbowed to the face in a 1–1 draw against Lorient. 14 days later on 28 November 2010, Ceará able to make a return in a 2–2 draw against Olympique Lyonnais. However, Ceará was able to get more playing time in the UEFA Europa League where he played 9 games of 12 match. PSG beat Israeli side Maccabi Tel Aviv 5–4 aggregate in the play-off round to go Group Stage. At the group stage, PSG was the top of the table of Group J. In the Knockout stage, PSG beat BATE Borisov on away goal in first round before being eliminated in last 16 by Portuguese side Benfica 3–2 on aggregate, thus out of Europa League. Also, PSG once again progress into the final against Ligue 1 winner Lille where he made a start in the right back but Lille won 1–0 thanks to Ludovic Obraniak.

The following season in 2011/12, Ceará was linked with Brazilian side Santos who offered him a three-year contract but he rejected made the choice of the heart and on 16 September 2011, he signed a one-year deal, extend his stay until 2013. With the arrival of Qatar Investment Authority and director of football Leonardo changing it ownership, the club signed prestigious players and sign new defenders like Milan Biševac and Diego Lugano. In Europa League Qualification first leg against FC Differdange 03, Ceará scored his first of the season in a 4–0 win, which followed up a 2–0 win in second leg. On 25 February 2012, Ceará scored his first goal in five years in a 4–4 draw against Olympique Lyonnais. In December 2011, Kombouaré was sacked and replaced by Carlo Ancelotti. Under Ancelotti, Ceará face competition from defenders following arrivals of Brazilians Alex and Maxwell. Ceará then lost his place in the right back position as Ancelotti preferred Biševac. Ceará feels that their manager Ancelotti why he offered no explanation as to why he has been dropped and admits his situation is unlikely to change any time soon and claims to be at a loss to explain his snub, with no-one having communicated to him why he now finds himself on the bench. Later on the season, Ceará spend times on the bench without getting any playing time. By the end of season, PSG released Ceará after spending five years at the club.

=== Cruzeiro ===
After five years in France, Ceará left Brazil by joining Cruzeiro, which will keep him until 2013.

== Personal ==
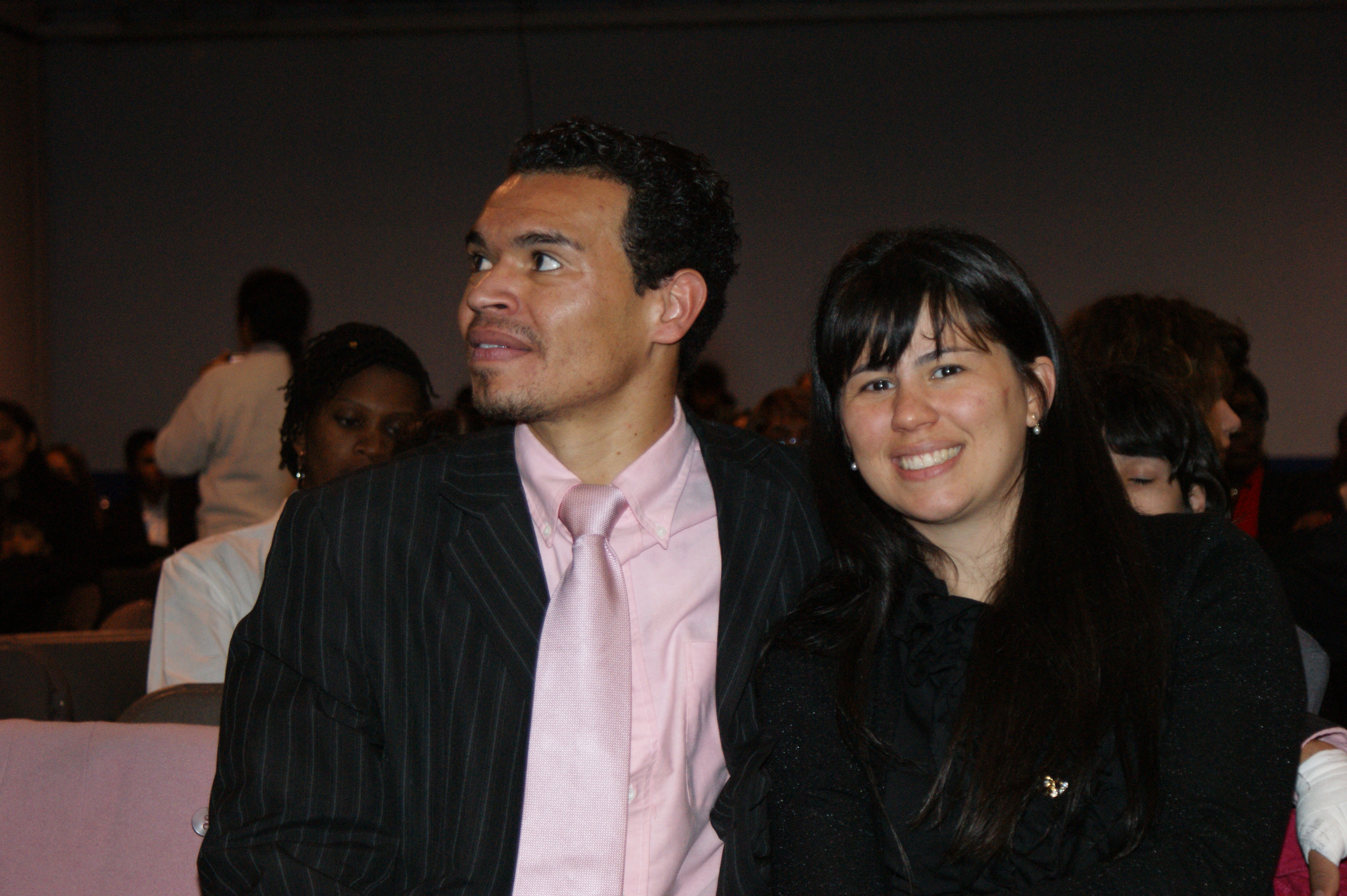
Ceará pictured with his wife, Fernanda.

Ceará is married to Fernanda Ceará and has three children, two daughters and a son. Ceará speaks fluently Portuguese and French. Like many other Brazilian men's footballers, Ceará is a devout evangelical Christian, and is now a pastor. Ceará became involved with religion at the age of 18 in August 1998. "I've been touched by the unconditional love of Jesus, I decided to give my life to the Lord." In 2006, Ceará founded a church in Porto Alegre.

In a documentary called 'Jesus Football Club' aired on Canal+, Ceará quoted: "'I am against divorce and abortion. I'm not really for homosexuality. It takes away a little bit of God's plan.

== Honours ==
Coritiba

- Campeonato Paranaense: 2003

São Caetano

- Campeonato Paulista: 2004

Internacional

- Copa Libertadores: 2006
- FIFA Club World Championship: 2006
- Recopa Sudamericana: 2007

Paris Saint-Germain

- Coupe de la Ligue: 2007–08
- Coupe de France: 2009–10

Cruzeiro

- Campeonato Brasileiro Série A: 2013, 2014
- Campeonato Mineiro: 2014
