= Alex (footballer, born March 1982) =

Brazilian footballer (born 1982)

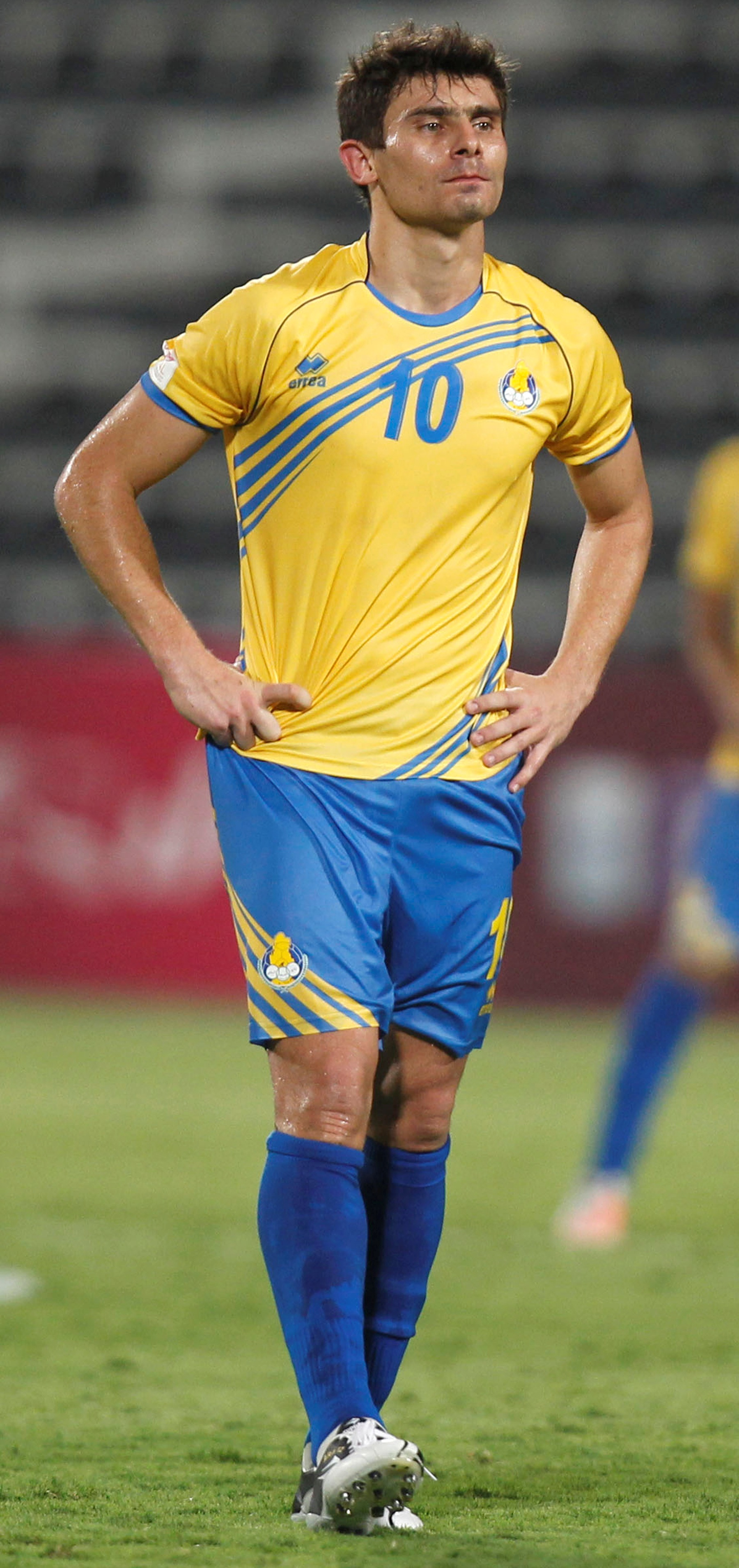

Personal information
- Full name: Alexandre Raphael Meschini
- Date of birth: 25 March 1982 (age 44)
- Place of birth: Cornélio Procópio, Brazil
- Height: 1.75 m (5 ft 9 in)
- Position: Midfielder

Team information
- Current team: Corinthians (assistant)

Youth career
- 2000–2002: Guarani

Senior career*
Years	Team	Apps	(Gls)
2003–2004	Guarani	40	(6)
2004–2009	Internacional	168	(56)
2009–2011	Spartak Moscow	54	(15)
2011–2012	Corinthians	32	(6)
2012–2013	Al-Gharafa	19	(5)
2013–2016	Internacional	93	(7)

International career
2008–2009	Brazil	3	(0)

Managerial career
- 2021–: Corinthians (assistant)
- * Club domestic league appearances and goals

Alexandre Raphael Meschini (born 25 March 1982), simply known as Alex, is a Brazilian football coach and former player who played as a midfielder. He currently works as a football pundit on SporTV's nightly 'Troca de Passes'.

== Early career ==
Alex was born in Cornélio Procópio, Paraná. His family are Italian descents when his grandmother on his father side came to Brazil. By the time he was one year old, his family had relocated to Itambé, Bahia, and relocated again to Santa Amélia when he was seven. He has two brothers, who work in banking and agronomy respectively.

At Santa Amélia, Alex spent much of his childhood playing football; he played for Atlético Pirassunungense at age nine. His family once again relocated to Campinas, São Paulo. When he was sixteen, he signed for Primavera (where he was signed by his cousin). He went on a trial to his future club Corinthians, only to be rejected. He was determined not to give up his football career.

== Club career ==
=== Guarani ===
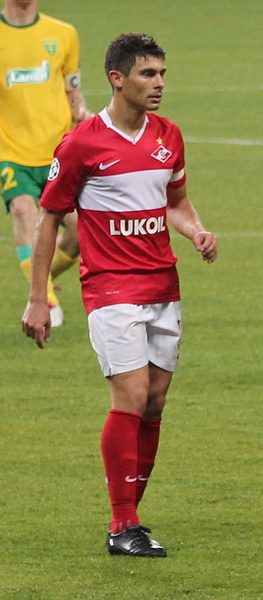
Alex in a match against Kuban Krasnodar

Alex joined Guarani in 2000 and played his first match in a youth match against Capivari. Upon joining Guarani, he recalled "We did not have enough to eat and ended up at a club partner of Guarani in disrepair."

In 2003, he made his debut in the first team match against União Barbarense. At Guarani, he quickly became a team regular, spent two seasons at 54 games and scored 7 goals. He also played left wing and was the main corner taker and as well, free kicks.

=== Internacional ===
Alex joined Internacional from Guarani on 11 March 2004 for a fee of €450,000, signing a four-year deal. Shortly after his move, he said, "It is an honour to play at a club with four Brazilian bonds and the largest crowd of the Rio Grande".

However, in August, his debut was delayed after suffering an ankle injury, resulting in being out for three months. Between 2004 and 2005, he was unable to establish himself in the first team. The following season, Alex was in hospital due to injury, and by the end of the season, the club won the title of Campeonato Gaúcho. In February, he suffered an injury to his right knee, keeping him out for four months. During a match in Libertadores Cup, he suffered an injury on his pubis. While in the first team, he played in the positions of left midfielder and second striker.

After recovering from the pubis injury, Alex returned in a 1–0 win over Esporte Clube Novo Hamburgo on 18 March 2006. After the match, he was voted the man of the match by the club's official website. In the second round of Libertadores, he played as a starter in a 2–1 win over Nacional. From then on, Alex established himself as a starter and key player under coach Abel Braga.

In the semi-final of Libertadores in the second leg after a 0–0 draw in the first leg, Alex scored and helped the club, ending a long-awaited place in the final of the Libertadores against São Paulo. The club won the title 4–3 on aggregate.

"I became a winner and very happy with this comeback. Difficulties that were overcome with persistence. If you do not have a structure and not chasing their goals, it becomes increasingly difficult."

— Alex on his comeback in the final

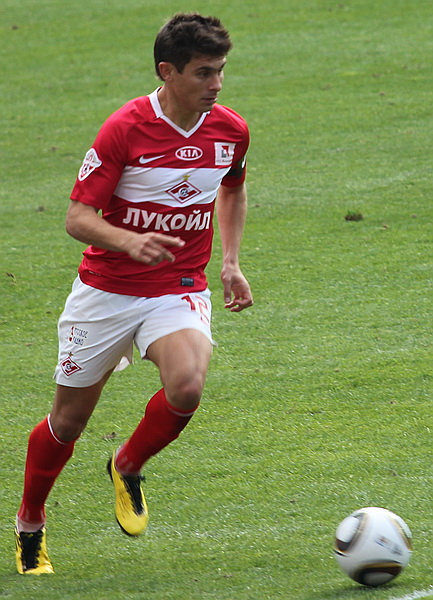
Alex dribbling during a match

Because of the club's winning the Copa Libertadores, the club participated in the FIFA Club World Cup. Alex suffered an injury, but eventually recovered and played an important role in the final as Internacional beat Barcelona 1–0.

After the tournament, he was linked with a move to Russian club CSKA Moscow after being recommended by Paulo Paixão, but the move never happened.

The next season, Alex suffered an injury to his muscles of both hips, resulting him out for two months. He recovered from the injury and was an important member of the team as he led the club winning the Recopa Sudamericana after beating Pachuca 5–2 on aggregate, which he scored on the penalty in the second leg.

In the summer transfer of 2007, he was linked with an 8 million move to German side VfL Wolfsburg, but it never happened. Among those interested was Barcelona, but they signed someone instead.

Once again in December, Alex suffered a pubis injury caused by an inguinal hernia.

In his final season, he chose the number 10 shirt.

Manager Braga began to put Alex at the center of the field. In the Copa Sudamericana, he became a top scorer with 13 goals, along with Nilmar, and was voted the best player in the tournament. In the final of Copa Sudamericana Finals against Estudiantes, Alex scored in the penalty, giving the only goal in the game in the first-leg. In the second-leg, the club won the Copa Sudamericana again after a 1–1 draw. On 6 July 2008, Alex scored a hat-trick in a 3–0 win over Coritiba. In the summer transfer of 2008, he was in the transfer spotlight when he was linked with a move to Spartak Moscow worth €14 million. However, the potential buyers has not been reached.

=== Spartak Moscow ===
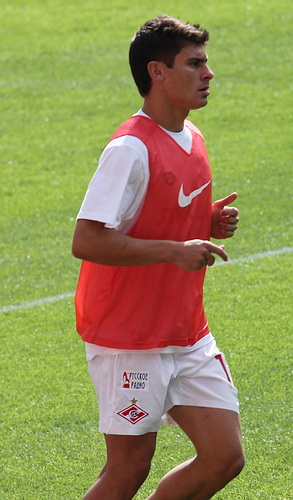
Alex training before a match

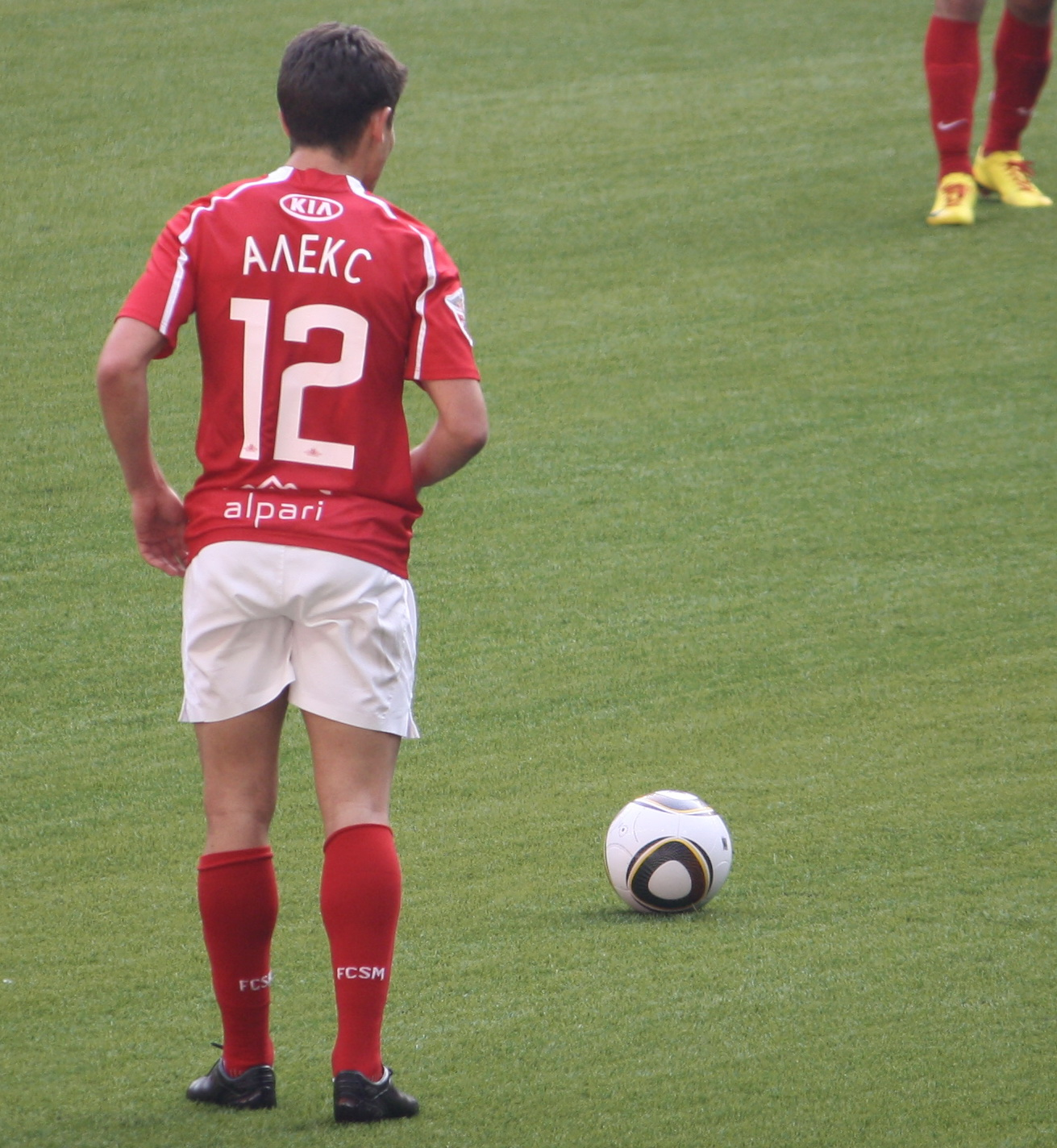
Alex prepared to take a kick

Alex joined Spartak Moscow in February 2009 for a transfer worth €5 million and on a contract keeping him there, until 2013. After leaving Brazil for Russia, Alex explained his departure, stating the time had come for him to play in Europe and against his wishes to stay for the rest of his career at Internacional. On 2 March 2009, he was presented by the club and was given the number 12 shirt.

Frankly, it is hard to leave home. However, in Internacional I accomplished a lot, so leave the team happy. Outcome of the negotiations about the transfer are good for me and for the club. (Spartak Moscow) this is an interesting team, the draft of which is the task to achieve success in European competitions.

— Alex

Alex made his debut for the club, where he made his first start and played 90 minutes, in a 1–1 draw against Zenit Saint Petersburg on the opening game of the season. Two weeks after the opening game of the season, he scored his first goal in a 2–0 win over Spartak Nalchik when he scored in a free-kick. On 23 May 2009, he scored a brace in a 5–1 win over Amkar Perm. In his first season, he had an optimal season, with the club second place, missing out to become first place behind Rubin Kazan, who won the title for the second time, as Alex made 29 appearances, scoring 12 goals and providing 9 assists. In a match against Amkar Perm, Alex was given a captaincy and made a double assist in a 2–1 win.

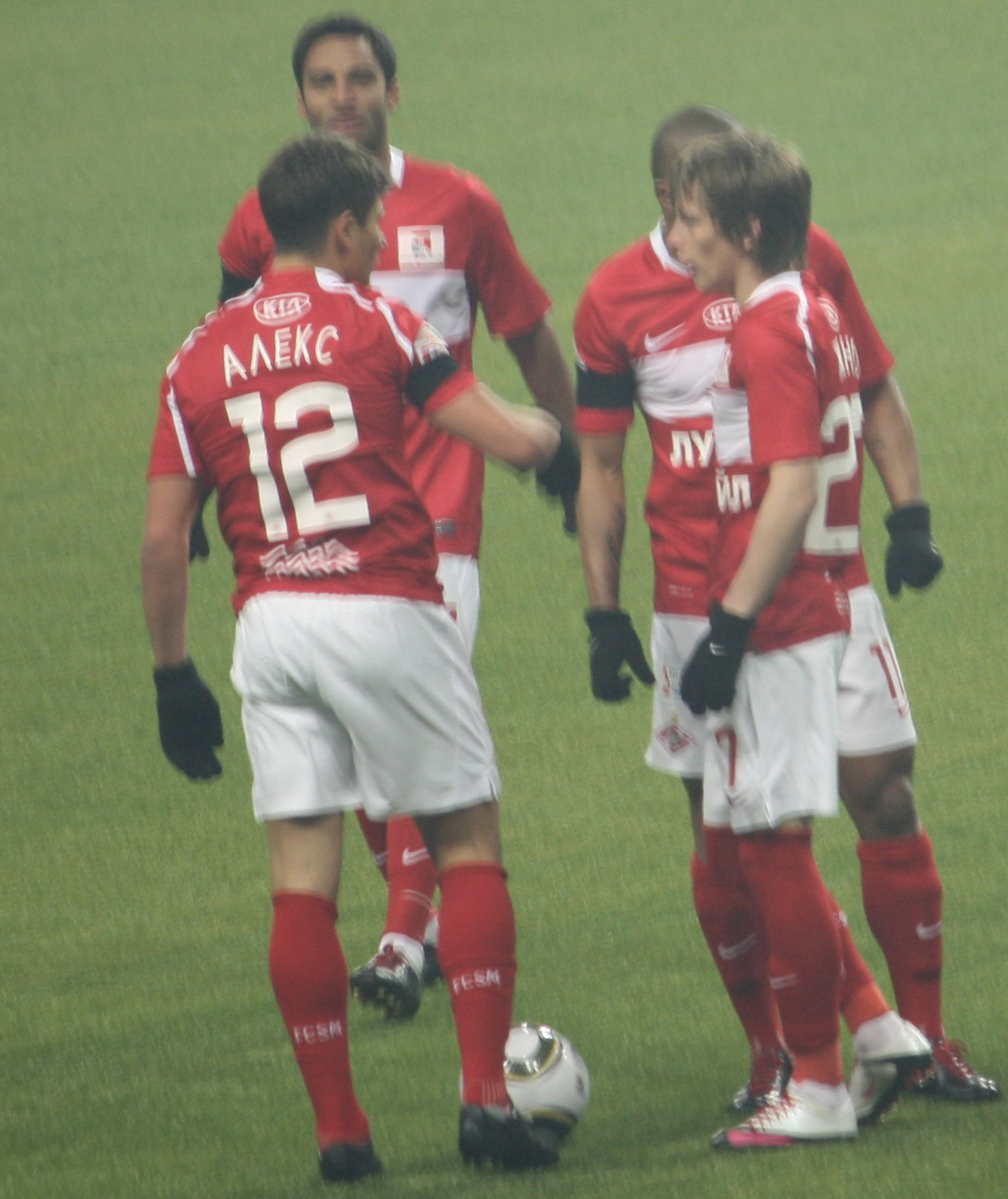
Alex with teammates

The following season, Alex did not make a bright start, as in the previous last season. In a match against Spartak Nalchik on 25 April 2010, he received a second bookable offence in a 0–0 draw. Due to lack of his performance earlier in the season, Manager Valery Karpin spoke out about Alex, claiming he had a problem with psychology. On 21 July 2010, Alex made a fourth assist in a 5–3 win over Sibir Novosibirsk. With the departure of Martin Jiránek to Birmingham City in August, Alex was named the new captain of Spartak after just one and a half seasons with the club. During a match against Alania Vladikavkaz on 15 October 2010, he scored in a penalty spot but suffered an injury on the muscles of his right thigh. By 7 November, he made his return in a 1–1 draw against Rubin Kazan (which turned out to be the last league appearance of the season). In the Champions League campaign, he made his debut in a 1–0 win over Marseille on the opening game of the group stage. In the first game against MŠK Žilina, he set up a goal for Ari in a 3–0 win. In the second game, he scored and set up a goal for Ibson in a 2–1 win in the final game of the group stage, resulting in the club going to the Europa League. At the end of the season, Alex had made 27 games and scored 5 goals.

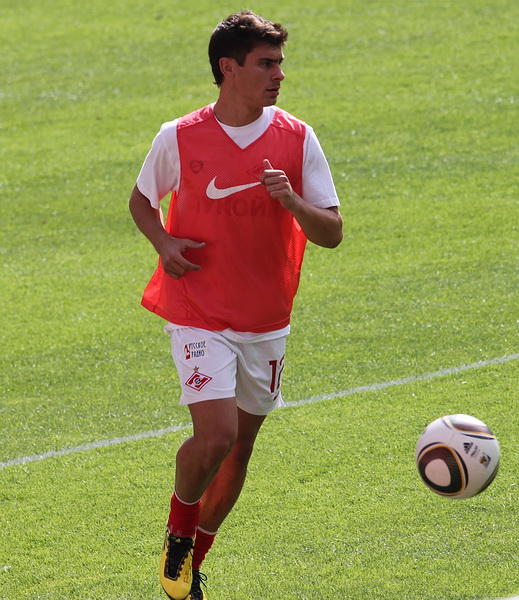
Alex training as the ball is kicked in the background

The following season, Alex made a few appearance until his move back to Brazil. He played his first match in the Europa League where he made a double assist in a 3–2 win over Basel in the first leg. The club advanced to the next round after a 1–1 draw in the second leg. Against Ajax, he scored twice in each leg and the club won both games against Ajax before losing to Porto in both leg 10–3 on aggregate. In the semi-final of the Russian Cup, he made his last appearance in a 5–4 loss against CSKA Moscow. In April 2011, he announced his intention to leave Spartak Moscow. This was later explained as his wife was seven months pregnant and feared a miscarriage. However, his son was born prematurely and he needed to support his wife. Alex was also struggling with the freezing weather as another reason he wanted to leave despite being content on the pitch. After leaving the club, he made his final interview and apologised to Spartak's fans.

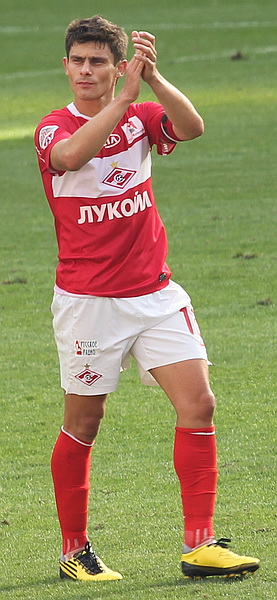
Alex clapping after a match

=== Corinthians ===
On 13 May 2011, Spartak agreed the transfer of Alex to Corinthians for 6 million and signed until 2014. Four days later, on 17 May, he was presented by the club in São Paulo.

"I'm back, but not because of lack of adaptation in Russia. In Russia, I was treated very well, even though I could not read, write or speak in Russian. It goes back to the fact that it was an offer from Corinthians, and also influenced by family matters. Also returning to Brazil can help me realize my dream of play at the World Cup. That is my choice. Spartak knew of my intentions. I can not say that I leave Spartak happy because was not able to win anything with this team. I hope the victory will come to me in Corinthians.

— Alex on his return to Brazil

One month since joining Corinthians on 30 June 2011, he made his debut in a 1–0 win over Bahia. 38 days later, he scored his first goal in a 1–1 draw against Atlético Paranaense. After scoring his first goal, he scored three more in three games.

During a match against Santos on 18 September in a 3–1 loss, Alex collapsed on the field and was immediately taken to Hospital São Luiz. Despite serious concerns, he was released after no injuries were found by a CT scan.

At the end of the season, the club won their first league title in six years and also won the Copa Libertadores Finals. In the final, Alex played in attacking midfield in both legs.

For Corinthians, Alex played 56 games and scored nine goals.

=== Al-Gharafa ===
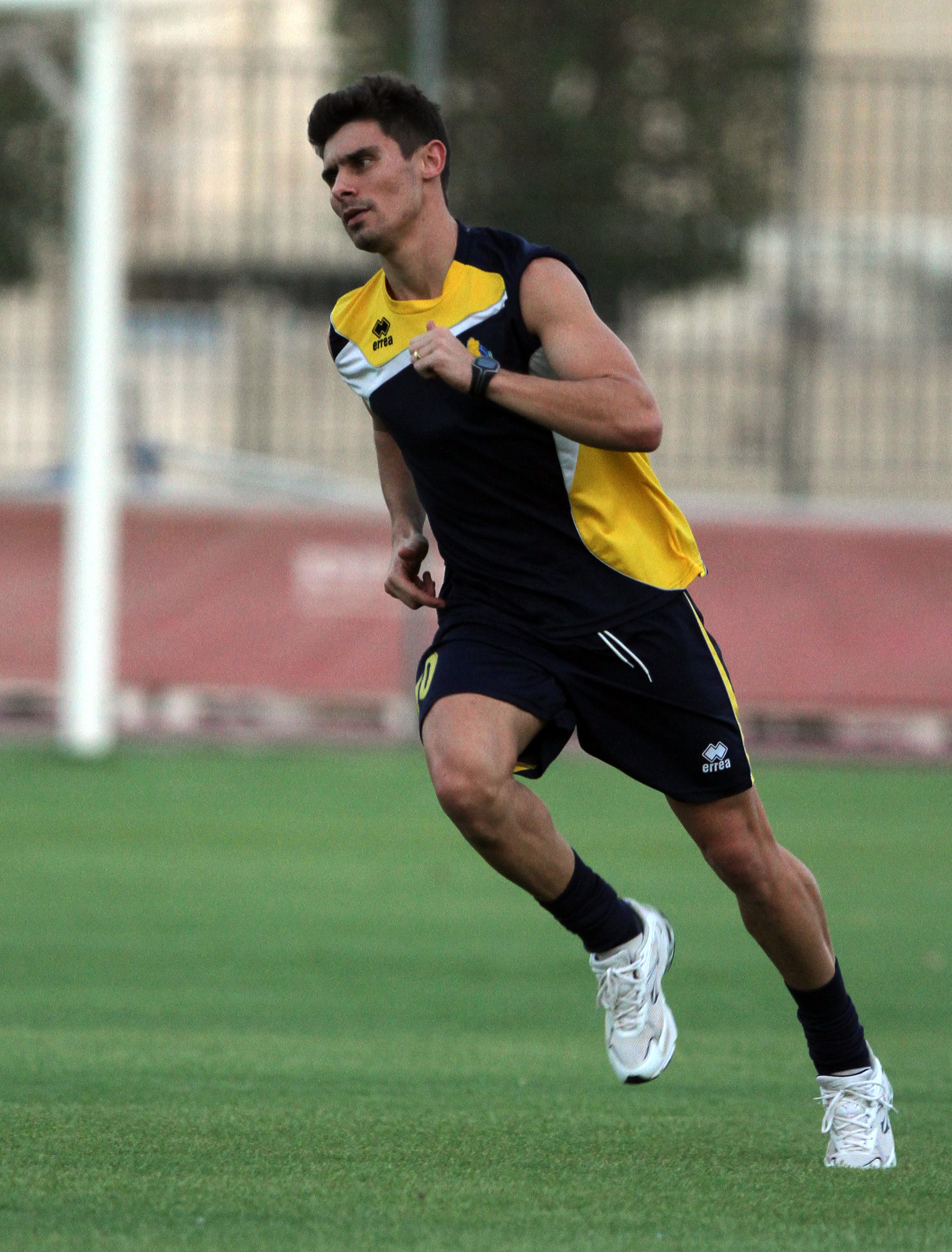
Alex training for Al-Gharafa

For €6 million, on 17 July 2012, Alex left Corinthians and was transferred to Qatari side Al-Gharafa, where he joined his Brazilian compatriots Diego Tardelli and Afonso Alves. Two months after signing for the club, Alex made his debut in a 2–0 loss against Al-Wakrah. On 21 October 2012, he scored his first goal in a 2–0 win over El Jaish. In January 2013, Nenê was recruited by Al-Gharafa from Paris Saint-Germain, meaning that Alex had to leave the club as the foreign players' quota was reached, as announced on the Qatar Stars League official website. However, the departure of Diego Tardelli a week later led to the reinstatement of Alex, who would continue with Al-Gharafa until the end of the season.

=== Return to Internacional ===
On 20 July 2013, just one day after joining Al-Gharafa the previous year, Alex made a return to Internacional for worth €3 million and signed a deal with them, until 2015.

== International career ==
On 12 October 2008, Alex replaced Kaká in 70th minute in the match against Venezuela to make his international debut.

== Personal life ==
Alex is married to Ana Paula, and has two sons: Lucas (born in 2006), and Theo (born in 2011).

== Career statistics ==
Appearances and goals by club, season and competition
Club	Season	League			National cup (Note: Includes Copa do Brasil, Russian Cup, Emir of Qatar Cup.)		Continental		State League		Total	
Club	Season	Division	Apps	Goals	Apps	Goals	Apps	Goals	Apps	Goals	Apps	Goals
Guarani	2003	Série A	40	19	0	0	0	0	0	0	40	19
Guarani	2004	Série A	0	0	0	0	0	0	9	3	9	3
Guarani	Total		40	19	0	0	0	0	9	3	49	22
Internacional	2004	Série A	20	10	0	0	0	0	0	0	20	10
Internacional	2005	Série A	23	10	0	0	0	0	0	0	23	10
Internacional	2006	Série A	15	12	0	0	0	0	0	0	15	12
Internacional	2007	Série A	28	10	0	0	0	0	0	0	28	10
Internacional	2008	Série A	23	14	0	0	0	0	0	0	23	14
Internacional	Total		109	56	0	0	0	0	0	0	109	56
Spartak Moscow	2009	Russian Premier League	29	12	0	0	0	0	0	0	29	12
Spartak Moscow	2010	Russian Premier League	22	3	0	0	6 (Note: Four appearances in the UEFA Champions League, two appearances in the UEFA Europa League)	0	0	0	28	3
Spartak Moscow	2011	Russian Premier League	3	0	0	0	0	0	0	0	3	0
Spartak Moscow	Total		54	15	0	0	6	0	0	0	60	15
Corinthians	2011	Série A	28	6	0	0	0	0	0	0	28	6
Corinthians	2012	Série A	4	0	0	0	12 (Note: Appearances in the Copa Libertadores)	1	12	1	28	2
Corinthians	Total		32	6	0	0	12	1	12	1	56	8
Al-Gharafa	2012	Qatar Stars League	0	0	0	0	0	0	0	0	0	0
Career total			235	96	0	0	18	1	21	4	274	101

== Honours ==
Internacional

- Campeonato Gaúcho: 2004, 2005, 2008, 2014, 2015
- Copa Libertadores: 2006
- FIFA Club World Cup: 2006
- Recopa Sudamericana: 2007
- Copa Sudamericana: 2008

Corinthians

- Campeonato Brasileiro Série A: 2011
- Copa Libertadores: 2012

Individual

- Campeonato Brasileiro Série A Team of the Year: 2008
