= Chiquinho (footballer, born 1983) =

Brazilian footballer

Personal information
- Full name: Paulo Francisco da Silva Paz
- Date of birth: June 20, 1983 (age 43)
- Place of birth: Canguçu, Brazil
- Height: 1.71 m (5 ft 7 in)
- Position: Left-back

Youth career
- 2000: Internacional

Senior career*
Years	Team	Apps	(Gls)
2001–2009	Internacional	46	(1)
2006	→ Palmeiras (Loan)		
2007	→ Goiás (Loan)	9	(0)
2008–2009	→ Fortaleza (Loan)		
2009	→ Joinville (Loan)		
2010	Joinville	4	(0)
2010	Fortaleza		
2010	River Plate de Montevideo	4	(0)
2011	São José		
2011	Brasil de Pelotas		
2011	Vitória	1	(0)
2012–	Paulista		
- * Club domestic league appearances and goals

Paulo Francisco da Silva Paz (born June 20, 1983), or simply Chiquinho, is a Brazilian professional footballer who plays as a left-back.

== Honours ==
- Rio Grande do Sul State Superleague: 2002
- Rio Grande do Sul State League: 2003, 2004, 2008
- Brazilian Cup: 2006
