= Bolívar (footballer, born 1980) =

Brazilian football manager and former player

Personal information
- Full name: Fabian Guedes
- Date of birth: 16 August 1980 (age 46)
- Place of birth: Santa Cruz do Sul, Brazil
- Height: 1.85 m (6 ft 1 in)
- Position: Centre back

Youth career
- 1997–1998: Guarani-VA

Senior career*
Years	Team	Apps	(Gls)
1999–2000	Guarani-VA	0	(0)
2001	Grêmio	0	(0)
2002	Joinville	0	(0)
2003	Guarani-VA	23	(6)
2003–2006	Internacional	95	(5)
2006–2009	Monaco	56	(0)
2008–2012	Internacional	334	(11)
2013–2014	Botafogo	95	(8)
2015	Novo Hamburgo	14	(0)
2015	Portuguesa	10	(0)

Managerial career
- 2018: União Rondonópolis
- 2018: Barra-SC
- 2019: Novo Hamburgo
- 2019: Cianorte
- 2019: Brasil de Pelotas
- 2020: Vila Nova
- 2021: Santa Cruz
- 2022: Chapecoense (assistant)
- 2022: Chapecoense (interim)
- 2022: Chapecoense (interim)
- * Club domestic league appearances and goals

Fabian Guedes (born 16 August 1980), commonly known as Bolívar, is a Brazilian football coach and former player who played as a central defender.

Born in Santa Cruz do Sul, Bolívar initially was a right back and then switched to center back. Very instrumental in the center of defense for Internacional in the 2006 Copa Libertadores which led to a transfer to AS Monaco for R$8,664,705, with 20% transfer fee belongs to third parties.

== Honours ==
Grêmio

- Campeonato Gaúcho: 2001
- Copa do Brasil: 2001

Internacional

- Campeonato Gaúcho: 2003, 2004, 2005, 2009, 2011, 2012
- Copa Libertadores: 2006, 2010
- FIFA Club World Cup: 2006
- Copa Sudamericana: 2008
- Suruga Bank Championship: 2009
- Recopa Sudamericana: 2011

Botafogo

- Campeonato Carioca: 2013
