= Ediglê =

Brazilian footballer (born 1978)

Personal information
- Full name: Ediglê Quaresma Farias
- Date of birth: 13 May 1978 (age 48)
- Place of birth: Fortaleza, Brazil
- Height: 1.85 m (6 ft 1 in)
- Position: Centre-back

Youth career
- 1995–1996: Ferroviário

Senior career*
Years	Team	Apps	(Gls)
1997	Ferroviário		
1998	Nacional de Manaus		
1998	Ceará		
1999	Americano-MA		
1999–2000	Rio Negro		
2001	Nacional de Manaus		
2002–2003	São Raimundo		
2004–2005	15 de Novembro		
2005–2006	Internacional	33	(1)
2007–2008	→ Marítimo (loan)	25	(2)
2008–2009	Portuguesa	25	(1)
2010	Náutico	0	(0)
2011	Linense	0	(0)
2011	Ferroviário	8	(0)
2012–2013	Esportivo	15	(1)
2013	Nacional de Manaus	2	(0)
2014	Passo Fundo	13	(1)
2015–2016	Fast Clube	0	(0)
2017	Manaus	0	(0)
2017–2018	São Raimundo	0	(0)
- * Club domestic league appearances and goals

Ediglê Quaresma Farias (born 13 May 1978), simply known as Ediglê, is a Brazilian former professional footballer who played as a central defender.

Ediglê has previously played for Internacional in the Campeonato Brasileiro. He also spent one season in the Primeira Liga playing for Marítimo.

== Honours ==
Internacional

- Copa Libertadores: 2006
- FIFA Club World Cup: 2006

Esportivo

- Campeonato Gaúcho Série B: 2012

Fast Clube

- Campeonato Amazonense: 2016

Manaus

- Campeonato Amazonense: 2017
