= Iarley =

Brazilian footballer (born 1974)

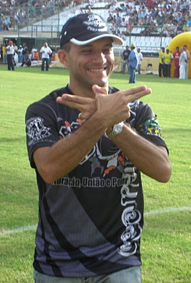
- Iarley in 2007

Personal information
- Full name: Pedro Iarley Lima Dantas
- Date of birth: 29 March 1974 (age 52)
- Place of birth: Quixeramobim, Brazil
- Height: 1.71 m (5 ft 7 1/2 in)
- Positions: Attacking midfielder; forward

Team information
- Current team: Santa Cruz-RS (head coach)

Youth career
- 1992–1993: Ferroviário

Senior career*
Years	Team	Apps	(Gls)
1993–1994	Ferroviário		
1994	→ Paysandu-PI (loan)		
1995	Quixadá		
1995–1997	Real Madrid B	27	(1)
1998	Nacional-AM		
1999–2000	Ceuta	36	(6)
2000–2001	Melilla	23	(10)
2001	Uniclinic		
2001–2002	Ceará	61	(13)
2003	Paysandu	22	(4)
2003–2004	Boca Juniors	27	(5)
2004–2005	Dorados	26	(5)
2005–2008	Internacional	110	(28)
2008–2009	Goiás	82	(23)
2010–2011	Corinthians	49	(10)
2011	→ Ceará (loan)	22	(5)
2011–2012	Goiás	75	(16)
2013	Paysandu	36	(4)
2014	Ferroviário	14	(5)
Total		610	(135)

Managerial career
- 2022: Garibaldi
- 2023–2024: Chapecoense U20
- 2024: Santa Cruz-RS
- 2024: Moto Club
- 2025: São Luiz
- 2025–: Santa Cruz-RS
- * Club domestic league appearances and goals

Pedro Iarley Lima Dantas (born 29 March 1974), simply known as Iarley, is a Brazilian football coach and former player who played as an attacking midfielder or a forward. He is the current head coach of Santa Cruz-RS.

== Club career ==
Born in Quixeramobim, Ceará, Iarley played for Ferroviário, Ceará, and Paysandu of Brazil, Real Madrid B, AD Ceuta and UD Melilla of Spain, Boca Juniors of Argentina and Dorados de Sinaloa of Mexico. He joined Internacional for the 2005 Campeonato Brasileiro from Dorados de Sinaloa, where he played during the 2004-2005 season. Although Iarley impressed at Dorados in his first season, he also struggled with injuries, appearing in only nine games, registering three assists.

At Internacional, Iarley made a good impression at first, but then lost his place in the team that eventually won the Copa Libertadores in 2006 to wonderboy Rafael Sobis. After Sobis's transfer to Real Betis, he took on the number 10 shirt and helped Inter win the FIFA Club World Cup in the same year.

In 2008, he moved on to Goiás. And in 2009, he scored 12 goals in Série A and his team made a good season despite finishing in 9th.

In the end of 2009, Iarley signed a contract with Corinthians. In the end of 2010, he moved to fellow Série A team Ceará .

Iarley retired from football on August 22, 2014, after leaving his first club Ferroviário.

== Honours ==
Ceará

- Campeonato Cearense: 2002, 2011

Boca Juniors

- Primera División: 2003 Apertura
- Intercontinental Cup: 2003

Internacional

- Copa Libertadores: 2006
- Recopa Sudamericana: 2007
- FIFA Club World Cup: 2006
- Campeonato Gaúcho: 2008

Goiás

- Campeonato Brasileiro Série B: 2012
- Campeonato Goiano: 2009, 2012

Paysandu

- Campeonato Paraense: 2013

Individual

- FIFA Club World Cup Silver Ball: 2006
