= Michel (footballer, born 1980) =

Brazilian footballer

Personal information
- Full name: Michel Neves Dias
- Date of birth: 13 July 1980 (age 46)
- Place of birth: São Paulo, Brazil
- Height: 1.81 m (5 ft 11 in)
- Position: Striker

Youth career
- 1998–1999: Juventude

Senior career*
Years	Team	Apps	(Gls)
2000–2004	Juventude	72	(13)
2003	→ Jeonnam Dragons (loan)	13	(4)
2004	Nacional da Madeira	5	(1)
2005	→ Cruzeiro (loan)	6	(0)
2005	→ Goiás (loan)	1	(0)
2005–2007	Internacional	24	(1)
2007	→ Juventude (loan)	11	(0)
2007	→ Marília (loan)	3	(0)
2008	→ Vitória (loan)	0	(0)
2008	→ Ipatinga (loan)	5	(0)
2009	→ Criciúma (loan)	1	(0)
2010	Novo Hamburgo	13	(4)
2010	América-RN	0	(0)
2010	Brasil Pelotas	5	(0)
2011	Novo Hamburgo	13	(2)
2011	Aimoré		
2012	Brasil Farroupilha	0	(0)
2013	Caxias	11	(2)
2013	Noroeste	0	(0)
2014–2015	Inter-SM	0	(0)
2015	Portuguesa	0	(0)
- * Club domestic league appearances and goals as of 2 September 2013

Michel Neves Dias (born 13 July 1980), or simply Michel, is a Brazilian footballer who plays as a striker.

== Honours ==
Juventude

- Copa do Brasil: 1999

Internacional

- Copa Libertadores: 2006
- FIFA Club World Cup: 2006

Vitória

- Campeonato Baiano: 2008
