= Fabiano Eller =

Brazilian footballer (born 1977)

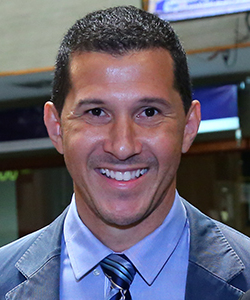
- Fabiano Eller in 2017

Personal information
- Full name: Fabiano Eller dos Santos
- Date of birth: 19 November 1977 (age 48)
- Place of birth: Linhares, Brazil
- Height: 6 ft 0 in (1.83 m)
- Position: Centre-back

Youth career
- 1994–1995: Linhares
- 1995–1996: Vasco da Gama

Senior career*
Years	Team	Apps	(Gls)
1996–2001	Vasco da Gama	35	(3)
2002	Palmeiras	9	(1)
2003–2004	Flamengo	50	(2)
2004	→ Al-Wakrah (loan)	0	(0)
2005	Fluminense	6	(0)
2005–2006	Trabzonspor	11	(0)
2006	→ Internacional (loan)	56	(4)
2007–2008	Atlético Madrid	30	(1)
2008–2009	Santos	25	(1)
2009–2010	Internacional	24	(2)
2010–2011	Al Ahli	8	(1)
2012	São José de Porto Alegre	16	(1)
2012	Brasil de Pelotas	7	(0)
2013	Audax Rio de Janeiro	14	(0)
2014–2015	Red Bull Brasil	24	(2)
2015–2016	Náutico	18	(1)
2016	→ Joinville (loan)	9	(1)

International career
2005	Brazil	1	(0)
- * Club domestic league appearances and goals

Fabiano Eller dos Santos, known as Fabiano Eller (born 19 November 1977), is a Brazilian former professional footballer who played as a central defender.

In the 2006 season, he played for Internacional while on loan from Turkish giants Trabzonspor. On 11 March 2007, Eller played his first game in La Liga, for Atlético Madrid against Deportivo La Coruña. He scored his first goal in La Liga, in an away match against Villarreal, on 8 April 2007.
In the 2009 season Eller returned to Internacional and won 2010 Copa Libertadores. After Copa Libertadores, Eller signed with Qatari side Al-Ahly.

He earned one international cap, gained in a friendly match when Brazil played against Guatemala on 27 April 2005.

== Honours ==
Vasco da Gama

- Campeonato Brasileiro: 1997, 2000
- Campeonato Carioca: 1998
- Copa Libertadores: 1998
- Torneio Rio - São Paulo: 1999
- Copa Mercosul: 2000

Flamengo

- Taça Guanabara: 2004
- Campeonato Carioca: 2004

Fluminense

- Taça Rio: 2005
- Campeonato Carioca: 2005

Internacional

- Copa Libertadores: 2006, 2010
- FIFA Club World Cup: 2006

Individual

- Campeonato Brasileiro Série A Team of the Year: 2006
