= Wason Rentería =

Colombian footballer (born 1985)

Personal information
- Full name: Wason Libardo Rentería Cuesta
- Date of birth: 4 July 1985 (age 41)
- Place of birth: Quibdó, Colombia
- Height: 1.86 m (6 ft 1 in)
- Position: Forward

Youth career
- 2001–2002: Patriotas
- 2002–2004: Boyacá Chicó

Senior career*
Years	Team	Apps	(Gls)
2004–2005	Boyacá Chicó	43	(13)
2005–2006	Internacional	35	(6)
2007–2010	Porto	6	(0)
2007–2008	→ Strasbourg (loan)	28	(9)
2008–2009	→ Braga (loan)	28	(6)
2009	→ Atlético Mineiro (loan)	15	(1)
2010	→ Braga (loan)	12	(3)
2011	Once Caldas	14	(10)
2011–2012	Caxias	0	(0)
2011–2012	→ Santos (loan)	13	(2)
2012–2013	Millonarios	51	(18)
2014	Racing Club	2	(0)
2015	La Equidad	18	(5)
2016	Boyacá Chicó	15	(5)
2017	Atlético Tubarão	15	(11)
2017	Guarani	4	(0)

International career
2005–2009	Colombia	20	(4)
- * Club domestic league appearances and goals

Wason Libardo Rentería Cuesta (born 4 July 1985) is a Colombian retired professional footballer who played as a forward.

== Club career ==
Born in Quibdó, Rentería began playing professionally with Boyacá Chicó in 2004. The following year, he was included in the Colombian team that took part in the 2005 FIFA World Youth Championship.

After his performances with under-20s, Rentería was transferred to Sport Club Internacional in Brazil. He showed his flair there, usually coming off the bench to score important goals, the first being one scored in a victory against Club Nacional that earned his club a quarter-final berth in the 2006 Copa Libertadores, and the next being a goal scored in the second leg of the quarter-finals against L.D.U. Quito; the club would eventually go on to win the tournament. Despite often playing backup to Rafael Sobis, who would then move to Real Betis, he became an important attacking element and a fan favourite at the Brazilian club.

Rentería's form was, however, cut short by a series of injuries that left him out of the side, also causing him to miss the entire 2006 FIFA Club World Cup. In the 2007 January transfer window he signed for FC Porto for R$7,457,400, but all of the fee belonged to a third-party owner; in reverse, International had to pay an additional commission to the football broker. Porto, on the other hand, re-sold 50% of its economic rights on any future transfer.

Rentería appeared rarely for the eventual champions – six matches, five as a substitute – and was sent on loan to RC Strasbourg seven months later. In spite of his nine Ligue 1 goals (squad best), they finished second from the bottom and he returned to Porto, being immediately loaned to fellow Primeira Liga side S.C. Braga; he was an undisputed starter throughout his first and only campaign, often partnering Albert Meyong, and also netted three goals in the Minho team's round-of-16 run in the UEFA Cup.

Porto would loan Rentería again for 2009–10, as he joined Clube Atlético Mineiro on 22 July 2009. However, in January 2010 he moved clubs again – still loaned – returning to league leaders Braga who would eventually finish second in the table.

In January 2011, Rentería returned to his country after a six-year absence, signing with Once Caldas, where he was an important player and scored 10 goals in 14 games as his club finished top of the table in the regular season. On 29 May, in the playoff semi-finals against Millonarios, he scored the only goal of the match to draw the aggregate score at 1–1; however, he missed his penalty in the shootout and his club were eliminated. Shortly after the 2011 Apertura, he left the club and joined Mexico's Cruz Azul for three years; however, just days after arriving, he rescinded his contract after failing his medical.

Subsequently, Rentería returned to Brazil and signed with Sociedade Esportiva e Recreativa Caxias do Sul, being loaned to Santos FC until December 2011 or June 2012.

== International career ==
Rentería represented Colombia at under-17, under-20 and senior levels. He made his full debut in 2005, and appeared for the nation at the 2005 CONCACAF Gold Cup.

== Personal life ==
Rentería's younger brother, Carlos, is also a footballer and a striker. Amongst others, he played for Atlético Nacional.

== Career statistics ==
Scores and results list Colombia's goal tally first, score column indicates score after each Rentería goal.

List of international goals scored by Wason Rentería
No.	Date	Venue	Opponent	Score	Result	Competition
1	8 September 2007	Estadio Nacional, Lima, Peru	Peru	2–1	2–2	Friendly
2	12 September 2007	El Campín, Bogotá, Colombia	Paraguay	1–0	1–0	Friendly
3	26 March 2008	Fort Lauderdale Stadium, Fort Lauderdale, United States	Honduras	1–1	1–2	Friendly
4	28 March 2009	El Campín, Bogotá, Colombia	Bolivia	2–0	2–0	2010 World Cup qualification
