= Rubens Cardoso =

Brazilian footballer and manager

Personal information
- Full name: Rubens Vanderlei Tavares Cardoso
- Date of birth: September 6, 1976 (age 50)
- Place of birth: São Paulo, Brazil
- Height: 1.78 m (5 ft 10 in)
- Position: Left wing back

Team information
- Current team: Brasil de Pelotas (assistant)

Youth career
- 1995–1996: Guarani

Senior career*
Years	Team	Apps	(Gls)
1997–1999	Guarani		
2000–2001	Santos		
2001	Grêmio		
2002	Palmeiras		
2003	Santos		
2004–2005	Atlético Mineiro		
2006–2007	Internacional		
2008–2009	Coritiba		
2009	Bahia		
2010–2011	Sertãozinho		
2012	Jabaquara		

Managerial career
- 2015: Amparo
- 2017–: Brasil de Pelotas (assistant)
- * Club domestic league appearances and goals

Rubens Vanderlei Tavares Cardoso (born September 6, 1976, in São Paulo), is a Brazilian retired left wingback is the current assistant manager of Brasil de Pelotas.

== Honours ==
=== Player ===
Grêmio

- Campeonato Gaúcho: 2001
- Copa do Brasil: 2001

Internacional

- FIFA Club World Cup: 2006
- Copa Libertadores: 2006

Coritiba

- Campeonato Paranaense: 2008
