= Fabinho (footballer, born 1976) =

Brazilian footballer

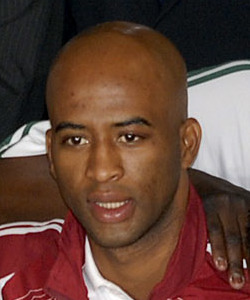
- Fabinho in 2007

Personal information
- Full name: Fábio de Jesus
- Date of birth: October 16, 1976 (age 50)
- Place of birth: Nova Iguaçu, Brazil
- Height: 1.73 m (5 ft 8 in)
- Position: Defensive midfielder

Youth career
- 1992–1993: Bonsucesso

Senior career*
Years	Team	Apps	(Gls)
1994–1997	Bonsucesso	-	(-)
1998–2001	Ponte Preta	90	(1)
2002	Gamba Osaka	20	(0)
2003	Flamengo	38	(0)
2004	Shimizu S-Pulse	3	(0)
2004–2005	Santos	62	(1)
2006	Internacional	12	(1)
2007–2009	Fluminense	58	(0)
- * Club domestic league appearances and goals

Fábio de Jesus or simply Fabinho (born October 16, 1976, in Nova Iguaçu), is a Brazilian former professional footballer who played as a defensive midfielder.

== Career statistics ==
Appearances and goals by club, season and competition
Club	Season	League			National cup (Note: Includes Copa do Brasil, Emperor's Cup.)		League cup (Note: Includes J.League Cup.)		Total	
Club	Season	Division	Apps	Goals	Apps	Goals	Apps	Goals	Apps	Goals
Ponte Preta	1998	Série A	13	0					13	0
Ponte Preta	1999	Série A	1	0					1	0
Ponte Preta	2000	Série A	22	0					22	0
Ponte Preta	2001	Série A	22	1					22	1
Ponte Preta	Total		58	1					58	1
Gamba Osaka	2002	J1 League	20	0	2	0	6	0	28	0
Flamengo	2003	Série A	38	0					38	0
Shimizu S-Pulse	2004	J1 League	3	0	0	0	1	0	4	0
Santos	2004	Série A	28	1					28	1
Santos	2005	Série A	26	0					26	0
Santos	Total		54	1					54	1
Internacional	2006	Série A	13	1					13	1
Career total			186	3	2	0	7	0	195	3

== Honours ==
Santos

- Campeonato Brasileiro Série A: 2004

Internacional

- Copa Libertadores: 2006
- FIFA Club World Championship: 2006

Fluminense

- Copa do Brasil: 2007
