= Perdigão (footballer, born 1977) =

Brazilian footballer

Personal information
- Full name: Cleilton Eduardo Vicente
- Date of birth: June 28, 1977 (age 49)
- Place of birth: Curitiba, Brazil
- Height: 1.69 m (5 ft 6 1/2 in)
- Position: Defensive midfielder

Youth career
- 1995: Pinheiros-RS
- 1995–1996: Paraná

Senior career*
Years	Team	Apps	(Gls)
1997	Atlético-PR	13	(2)
1998–1999	Belenenses (Loan)	9	(0)
1999	Londrina		
1999–2000	Atlético-PR	8	(1)
2001–2002	Joinville		
2003	Náutico	7	(0)
2004	Caxias		
2005	15 de Novembro	16	(0)
2005–2007	Internacional	52	(1)
2007	Vasco	21	(0)
2008	Corinthians		
- * Club domestic league appearances and goals

Cleilton Eduardo Vicente or simply Perdigão (born June 28, 1977 in Curitiba) was a defensive midfielder player from Brazil. Played at Vasco and Corinthians.

== Honours ==
- Libertadores Cup: 2006
- FIFA Club World Championship: 2006
- Recopa: 2007
