= Fernandão (footballer, born 1978) =

Brazilian footballer and manager

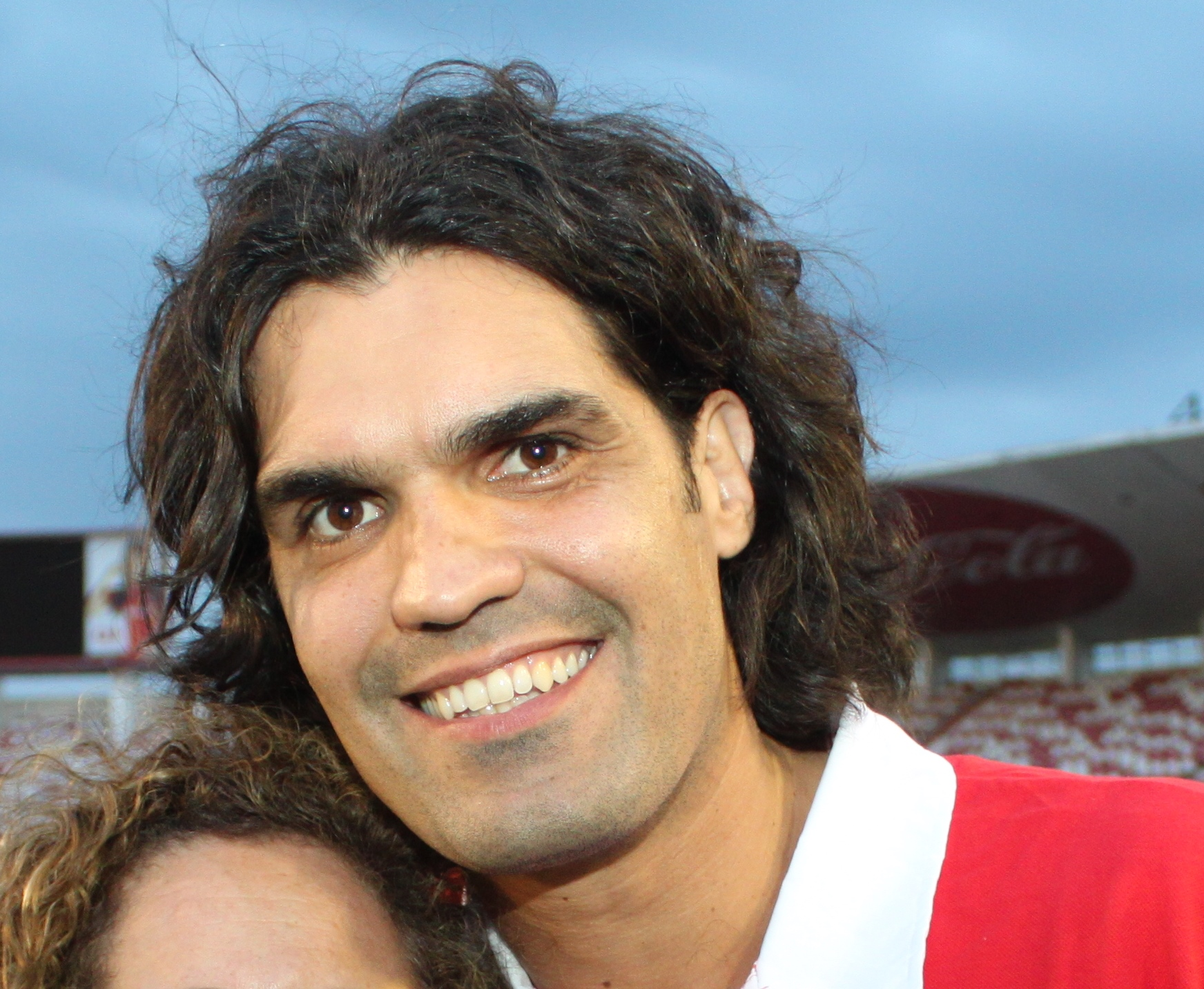
- Fernandão in 2011

Personal information
- Full name: Fernando Lúcio da Costa
- Date of birth: 18 March 1978
- Place of birth: Goiânia, Goiás, Brazil
- Date of death: 7 June 2014 (aged 36)
- Place of death: Aruanã, Goiás, Brazil
- Height: 1.90 m (6 ft 3 in)
- Position: Forward

Youth career
- 1995–1996: Goiás

Senior career*
Years	Team	Apps	(Gls)
1996–2002	Goiás	61	(11)
2001–2004	Marseille	61	(6)
2004	→ Toulouse (loan)	16	(3)
2004–2008	Internacional	100	(42)
2008–2009	Al Gharafa	22	(10)
2009–2010	Goiás	14	(3)
2010–2011	São Paulo	26	(8)
Total		300	(83)

International career
2005	Brazil	1	(0)

Managerial career
- 2012: Internacional
- * Club domestic league appearances and goals

Fernando Lúcio da Costa, better known as Fernandão (18 March 1978 – 7 June 2014), was a Brazilian professional footballer who played as a forward.

== Playing career ==
Having started his career at Goiás of Goiânia, Fernandão had a four-year spell in France, initially moving to Marseille for R$1.4 million, before returning to Brazil to play for Internacional. He helped the club finish as runners-up in the 2005 season of the Campeonato Brasileiro Série A. In the same year, he played his only international match against Guatemala, assisting Grafite for Brazil's third goal.

2006 was arguably Fernandão's best year. He led Internacional to win the Copa Libertadores for the first time ever. Fernandão was a joint top scorer of the competition and was voted man of the Match in the final against São Paulo, match in which he scored one goal and made one assist. After the win, he extended his contract with Sport Club Internacional and skippered the club to win the FIFA Club World Cup in December. In May 2010, São Paulo FC signed Fernandão from Goiás for an undisclosed fee. In May 2011, the two sides agreed to terminate the playing contract between them in a friendly manner.

== Coaching career ==
On 20 July 2012, Internacional, after the sacking of Dorival Júnior, announced Fernandão as their new coach. On 20 November, however, Fernandão was dismissed himself.

== Death ==
On 7 June 2014, Fernandão, aged 36, died in a helicopter crash. The Eurocopter AS350 where he was with four more people crashed by around 1 a.m. in Aruanã, Goiás, Brazil. All occupants were found dead.

Fernandão's wake was held at the training center of his first team Goiás before a burial in Goiânia. In Porto Alegre, Internacional honoured him with a statue outside Beira-Rio later that year, while in 2015, one of the streets outside the stadium received his name as "Rua Fernando Lúcio da Costa".

== Honours ==
Goiás

- Campeonato Brasileiro Série B: 1999
- Copa Centro-Oeste: 2000, 2001
- Campeonato Goiano: 1996, 1997, 1998, 1999, 2000

Internacional

- Campeonato Gaúcho: 2005, 2008
- Copa Libertadores de América: 2006
- FIFA Club World Cup: 2006
- Recopa Sudamericana: 2007
- Dubai Cup: 2008

Al-Gharafa

- Qatar Stars League: 2008-09
- Emir of Qatar Cup: 2009

Individual

- Campeonato Brasileiro Série A Team of the Year: 2006
- Bola de Prata: 2006
