= Wellington Monteiro =

Brazilian footballer (born 1978)

Personal information
- Full name: Wellington de Oliveira Monteiro
- Date of birth: 7 September 1978 (age 48)
- Place of birth: Rio de Janeiro, Brazil
- Height: 1.77 m (5 ft 10 in)
- Positions: Defensive midfielder; right-back

Youth career
- 1996–1998: Bangu

Senior career*
Years	Team	Apps	(Gls)
1999–2000	→ Etti Jundiaí (loan)	0	(0)
2001	→ Cruzeiro (loan)	0	(0)
2001–2002	Bangu	38	(4)
2003	→ Vasco (loan)	27	(0)
2004	Bangu	0	(0)
2004–2005	→ Caxias (loan)	0	(0)
2005	→ Juventude (loan)	6	(0)
2006	→ Caxias (loan)	0	(0)
2006–2008	Internacional	53	(2)
2008–2009	Fluminense	29	(0)
2010	Goias	28	(2)
2011	Linense	9	(0)
2012–2013	Guarani	21	(1)
2014	Audax Rio	3	(0)
2018	União Beltrão	2	(0)
2018–2019	Lajeadense		
- * Club domestic league appearances and goals

Wellington de Oliveira Monteiro or simply Wellington Monteiro (born 7 September 1978) is a Brazilian former professional footballer who played as a defensive midfielder.

== Career ==
In January 2010 Wellington Monteiro signed for Goias Esporte Clube, who recently re-signed with Fluminense. He player signed a one-year contract.

== Honours ==
- Copa Libertadores: 2006
- FIFA Club World Championship: 2006
- South America Supercup: 2007
