= 2006–07 FC Barcelona season =

108th season in existence of FC Barcelona

FC Barcelona
2006–07 season
- President: Joan Laporta
- Head Coach: Frank Rijkaard
- Stadium: Camp Nou
- La Liga: 2nd
- Copa del Rey: Semi-finals
- Supercopa de España: Winners
- UEFA Champions League: Round of 16
- UEFA Super Cup: Runners-up
- FIFA Club World Cup: Runners-up
- Top goalscorer: League: Ronaldinho (21); All: Ronaldinho (24)
Home colours	Away colours	Third colours

The 2006–07 season was an overall unsuccessful time for Futbol Club Barcelona in almost all competitions. Although the team managed to snatch the Supercopa de España, and finish second in the domestic league, a lot more was expected from the team that had been European champion. It started with the team's defeat at the final of the 2006 FIFA Club World Cup Final near the end of 2006, and the team did worse in 2007. This was the first of two bad seasons for the club, which led to great changes in the roster and direction. This also marks both the last season FC Barcelona wore a jersey without a sponsor and the first time a sponsor appeared in it: UNICEF (this was a non-commercial agreement).

== Events ==
- 30 June: Barça has reached the highest membership ever, with 156,366 members.

== Squad information ==
Carles Puyol, Lionel Messi, and Ronaldinho were selected as part of FIFPro World XI for the 2006–07 season.

N	Pos.	Nat.	Name	Age	EU	Since	App	Goals	Ends	Transfer fee	Notes
1	GK	(Spain)	Víctor Valdés	25	EU	2002	163	0	2010	Youth system	
2	DF	(Brazil)	Juliano Belletti	30	Non-EU	2004	96	1	2009	€6M	
3	MF	(Brazil)	Thiago Motta	24	EU	2002	138	9		Youth system	
4	DF	(Mexico)	Rafael Márquez	28	EU	2003	134	6	2010	€5M	
5	DF	(Spain)	Carles Puyol (captain)	29	EU	1999	263	5	2010	Youth system	
6	MF	(Spain)	Xavi (VC)	27	EU	1998	240	20	2010	Youth system	
7	FW	(Iceland)	Eiður Guðjohnsen	28	EU	2006	41	10	2009	€12M	
8	FW	(France)	Ludovic Giuly	30	EU	2004	117	23	2008	€7M	
9	FW	(Cameroon)	Samuel Eto'o	26	Non-EU	2004	115	73	2010	€24M	
10	FW	(Brazil)	Ronaldinho (VC)	27	EU	2003	170	80	2010	€30M	
11	DF	(Italy)	Gianluca Zambrotta	30	EU	2006	42	3	2010	€14M	
12	DF	(Netherlands)	Giovanni van Bronckhorst	32	EU	2003	141	5	2008	Free	Part-exchange for Cesc Fàbregas
15	MF	(Brazil)	Edmílson	30	EU	2004	79	0	2008	€10M	
16	DF	(Brazil)	Sylvinho	33	EU	2004	71	2	2008	€2M	
18	FW	(Spain)	Santiago Ezquerro	30	EU	2005	33	4	2008	Free	
19	FW	(Argentina)	Lionel Messi	19	EU	2004	65	25	2014	Youth system	
20	MF	(Portugal)	Deco	29	EU	2004	127	18	2008	€15M	
21	DF	(France)	Lilian Thuram	35	EU	2006	28	0	2008	€5M	
22	FW	(Argentina)	Javier Saviola	25	EU	2001	157	68	2007	loan	
23	DF	(Spain)	Oleguer	27	EU	2002	150	1	2010	Youth system	
24	MF	(Spain)	Andrés Iniesta	23	EU	2002	165	13	2010	Youth system	
25	GK	(Spain)	Albert Jorquera	28	EU	2001	13	0	2008	Youth system	
28	GK	(Spain)	Rubén	22	EU	2004	2	0		Youth system	

- Source: FC Barcelona, players' Wikipedia articles, ESPN (for appearances and goals) and footballdatabase.com (for EU passport)
- Ordered by most frequent start and position on pitch (from back right to front left).

== Transfers ==
=== In ===
No.	Pos.	Nat.	Name	Age	EU	Moving from	Type	Transfer window	Ends	Transfer fee	Source
11	DF	(Italy)	Zambrotta	29	EU	Juventus (Italy)	Transfer ✓	Summer	2010	€14M	
21	DF	(France)	Thuram	34	EU	Juventus (Italy)	Transfer ✓	Summer	2008	€5M	
7	FW	(Iceland)	Gudjohnsen	27	EU	Chelsea (England)	Transfer ✓	Summer	2009	€12m	
22	FW	(Argentina)	Saviola	24	EU	Sevilla	Return of loan	Summer	2007	—	

Total expenditure: ▼€31 million.

=== Out ===
No.	Pos.	Nat.	Name	Age	EU	Moving to	Type	Transfer window	Transfer fee	Source
17	MF	(Netherlands)	van Bommel	29	EU	Bayern Munich (Germany)	Transfer ✓	Summer	€6M	
7	FW	(Sweden)	Larsson	34	EU	Helsingborgs IF (Sweden)	Contract Termination ✗	Summer	Free	
11	FW	(Argentina)	Maxi López	22	EU	Mallorca	Loan →	Summer	N/A	
	DF	(Spain)	Damia	24	EU	Betis	Transfer ✓	Summer	€1M	
	DF	(Spain)	F. Navarro	24	EU	Mallorca	Transfer ✓	Summer	€6M	
	DF	(Spain)	Óscar López	26	EU	Betis	Transfer ✓	Summer	N/A	
18	MF	(Spain)	Gabri	27	EU	Ajax (Netherlands)	Transfer ✓	Summer	Free	
	GK	(Turkey)	Rüştü	33	EU	Fenerbahçe (Turkey)	Transfer ✓	Summer	Free	
34	DF	(Spain)	Rodri	21	EU	Deportivo La Coruña	Transfer ✓	Summer	Free	

EU = if holds or not a European Union passport; Country: when 2 flags, 1st flag = country that plays for internationally, 2nd flag = country of birth; N = number on jersey; P = Position (for position name, pause mouse pointer on abbreviation); Name = Name on jersey (for more extensive name, pause mouse pointer on name); Age = age on the day of the signing; Moving from = only indicate the club the player was playing before start playing for this club in this season, for the type of the moving see Status column; Moving to = only indicates the club the player is going to play next, for the type of the moving see Status column; Ends = when the player's current contract ends; n/a = Not applicable.

Total income: ▲€13 million.

Expenditure: ▼€18 million.

== Squad stats ==
				Total			La Liga		UEFA Champions League		Copa del Rey		Others^{1}	
No.	Pos.	Nat.	Name	Sts	App	Gls	App	Gls	App	Gls	App	Gls	App	Gls
1	GK	(Spain)	Valdés	50	50		38		8				4	
11	RB	(Italy)	Zambrotta	35	42	3	29	3	6		5		2	
4	CB	(Mexico)	Márquez	36	37	1	21	1	6		5		5	
5	CB	(Spain)	Puyol	54	54	2	35	1	8	1	6		5	
12	LB	(Netherlands)	Gio	30	34		23		4		4		3	
24	MF	(Spain)	Iniesta	40	44	9	27	6	8	2	5	1	4	
6	MF	(Spain)	Xavi	44	54	6	35	3	7		7	2	5	1
20	MF	(Portugal)	Deco	47	47	6	31	1	8	2	3		5	3
19	FW	(Argentina)	Messi (Note: Injured for 3 months)	31	35	17	26	14	5	1	2	2	2	
9	FW	(Cameroon)	Eto'o (Note: Injured for 5 months)	25	27	13	19	11	3	1	2	1	3	
10	FW	(Brazil)	Ronaldinho	49	49	24	32	21	8	2	4		5	1
25	GK	(Spain)	Jorquera	9	9						6		3	
2	DF	(Brazil)	Belletti	18	23		13		2		2		6	
21	DF	(France)	Thuram	27	29		23		4		1		1	
23	DF	(Spain)	Oleguer	22	38		25		5		5		3	
16	DF	(Brazil)	Sylvinho	20	22		13		2		3		4	
3	MF	(Brazil)	Motta	19	29		14		6		2		7	
15	MF	(Brazil)	Edmílson	26	32		26		2		4			
7	FW	(Iceland)	Gudjohnsen	21	42	10	25	5	8	3	5	1	4	1
8	FW	(France)	Giuly	26	45	6	27	3	8	2	5		5	1
18	FW	(Spain)	Ezquerro	6	18	3	9	1	2		3		4	2
22	FW	(Argentina)	Saviola	10	24	10	18	5	1		5	5		
28	GK	(Spain)	Rubén											

Source: FC Barcelona and ESPN
Ordered by most frequent start and position on pitch (from back right to front left)
0 shown as blank
^{1} Other Competitions: Spanish Super Cup, UEFA Super Cup, FIFA Club World Cup, Copa Catalunya

== Coaching staff ==
Position	Staff
Head coach	Frank Rijkaard
Assistant coach	Johan Neeskens / Eusebio Sacristán
Goalkeeping coach	Juan Carlos Unzué
Fitness coach	Paco Seirul·lo / Albert Roca
Doctors	Ricard Pruna / Gil Rodas / Toni Tramullas
Representative	Carles Naval

Source: FC Barcelona

== Players used from youth system ==
=== Appearances excluding Catalonia Cup ===
EU	Country	N	P	Name	App	Goals	Unused Sub.	Notes
EU passport	ESP	26	DF	Olmo	1	0	2	On 90 min at Getafe 1x1 Barcelona for La Liga
EU passport	ESP	32	MF	Marc Crosas	0	0	2	On FIFA Club World Cup
No	MEX	31	FW	Giovani	0	0	2	On FIFA Club World Cup

=== Catalonia Cup ===
EU	Country	N	P	Name	GS	SB	Goals	Notes
EU passport	ESP	5	DF	Olmo	2	0	0	
EU passport	ESP	4	MF	Marc Crosas	2	0	0	
?	MEX	7	FW	Giovani	2	0	2	
EU passport	ESP	14	FW	Víctor Vázquez	1	0	0	
EU passport	ESP	11	FW	Orlandi	1	1	0	
EU passport	ESP	15	FW	Toni Calvo	0	2	0	
EU passport	ESP	12	MF	Sastre	1	1	0	
EU passport	JOR	17	FW	Thaer	0	2	0	
EU passport	ESP	6	MF	Marc Valiente	0	2	0	
EU passport	ESP	20	MF	Sergio Busquets	0	1	0	From FC Barcelona Youth A

Source: FC Barcelona
Only competitive matches.
All players from FC Barcelona B unless expressed.
EU = if holds or not a European Union passport; Country: 1st flag=country of birth, 2nd flag=country that plays for internationally (if different); N = number on jersey; P = Position; Name = Name on jersey (for full name, pause the mouse pointer on the name); App = Appearances; GS = Game started; SB = Used as Substitute;

== Kit ==
Supplier: Nike
Features: UNICEF (a noncommercial agreement, see FC Barcelona)

Home	Away	Third	Goalkeeper 1	Goalkeeper 2	Goalkeeper 3

=== Kit information ===
- Home: The new home kit adorned the more wider stripes for the first time since 1994–95 season. The home shorts were reverted to usual blue after one season utilized the unusual claret shorts. The home socks were blue and clarets
- Away: The new away kit featured a papaya orange colour that evoked memories of 1992 European Cup glory. The new feature of the away kit was the blue and claret detailing.
- Third: Previous season's away kit were retained as a third kit as an alternate choice for certain away games, but now with sponsor.

== Other information ==
President	Joan Laporta
Technical Secretary	Txiki Beguiristáin
Ground (capacity and dimensions)	Camp Nou (98,787 / ?)
Profit	€19.5 million

== Competitions ==
=== Supercopa de España ===
17 August 2006 First leg	Espanyol	0–1	Barcelona	Sants-Montjuïc, Barcelona
22:00	Pandiani (yellow card) 61'; Fredson (yellow card) 88'; Lacruz (yellow card) 89'		Motta (yellow card) 26'; Giuly 43'; Xavi (yellow card) 58'	Stadium: Estadi Olímpic Lluís Companys; Attendance: 26,550; Referee: González Vázquez

20 August 2006 Second leg	Barcelona	3–0 (4–0 agg.)	Espanyol	Les Corts, Barcelona
22:00	Xavi 2'; Deco 12', 62'; Motta (yellow card) 42'		Lacruz (yellow card) 34'; Pandiani (yellow card) 47'; Jarque (yellow card) 65'; Fredson (yellow card) 88'	Stadium: Camp Nou; Attendance: 57,512; Referee: Mejuto González

=== UEFA Super Cup ===
25 August 2006	Barcelona	0–3	Sevilla	Monaco
20:45	Sylvinho (yellow card) 47'		Renato 7'; Kanouté 45', (yellow card) 49'; Dani Alves (yellow card) 54'; Navarro (yellow card) 60'; Palop (yellow card) 77'; Escudé (yellow card) 85'; Maresca 89' (pen.), (yellow card) 90'	Stadium: Stade Louis II; Attendance: 17,480; Referee: Stefano Farina

=== FIFA Club World Cup ===
14 December 2006 Semi-final	América (Mexico)	0–4	(Spain) Barcelona	Yokohama
19:20	Fabiano (yellow card) 57'; López (yellow card) 69'	Report	Guðjohnsen 11'; Márquez 30'; Ronaldinho 65'; Deco 85'	Stadium: International Stadium Yokohama; Attendance: 62,316; Referee: Óscar Ruiz

17 December 2006 Final	Internacional (Brazil)	1–0	(Spain) Barcelona	Yokohama
19:20	Índio (yellow card) 45'; Adriano Gabiru 82', (yellow card) 84'; Iarley (yellow card) 90+3'	Report	Motta (yellow card) 55'	Stadium: International Stadium Yokohama; Attendance: 67,128; Referee: Carlos Batres

=== La Liga ===
==== Classification ====
Pos	Team	Pld	W	D	L	GF	GA	GD	Pts	Qualification or relegation
1	Real Madrid (C)	38	23	7	8	66	40	+26	76 (Note: RMA 2–0 BAR; BAR 3–3 RMA)	Qualification for the Champions League group stage
2	Barcelona	38	22	10	6	78	33	+45	76	Qualification for the Champions League group stage
3	Sevilla	38	21	8	9	64	35	+29	71	Qualification for the Champions League third qualifying round
4	Valencia	38	20	6	12	57	42	+15	66	Qualification for the Champions League third qualifying round
5	Villarreal	38	18	8	12	48	44	+4	62	Qualification for the UEFA Cup first round

Source: LFP
Rules for classification: 1st points; 2nd head-to-head points; 3rd head-to-head goal difference; 4th head-to-head goals scored; 5th goal difference; 6th number of goals scored; 7th Fair-play points
(C) Champions

==== Results by round ====
Round	1	2	3	4	5	6	7	8	9	10	11	12	13	14	15	16	17	18	19	20	21	22	23	24	25	26	27	28	29	30	31	32	33	34	35	36	37	38
Ground	A	H	A	H	A	H	A	H	A	H	A	H	A	H	H	A	A	H	A	H	A	H	A	H	A	H	A	H	A	H	A	H	A	H	A	H	H	A
Result	W	W	W	D	W	W	L	W	D	W	W	W	D	W	D	D	L	W	D	W	D	W	L	W	L	D	W	W	L	W	L	W	W	D	W	W	D	W
Position	7	4	3	3	2	1	2	1	2	1	1	1	1	1	2	2	2	2	1	1	1	1	2	1	2	2	2	1	1	1	1	1	1	2	2	2	2	2

Source: Competitive Matches
A = Away; H = Home; W = Win; D = Draw; L = Loss

==== Matches ====
28 August 2006 1	Celta Vigo	2–3	Barcelona	Vigo
	Fernando Baiano 42'; Gustavo López 65'		Samuel Eto'o 56'; Lionel Messi 60'; Eiður Guðjohnsen 88'	Stadium: Balaídos

9 September 2006 2	Barcelona	3–0	Osasuna	Barcelona
	Samuel Eto'o 2', 27'; Lionel Messi 37'			Stadium: Camp Nou

17 September 2006 3	Racing Santander	0–3	Barcelona	Santander
			Samuel Eto'o 18'; Ludovic Giuly 84'; Ronaldinho 90' (pen.)	Stadium: El Sardinero

24 September 2006 4	Barcelona	1–1	Valencia	Barcelona
	Andrés Iniesta 49'		David Villa 17'	Stadium: Camp Nou

30 September 2006 5	Athletic Bilbao	1–3	Barcelona	Bilbao
	Francisco Yeste 12'		Carles Puyol 45'; Eiður Guðjohnsen 61'; Javier Saviola 77'	Stadium: Estadio San Mames

15 October 2006 6	Barcelona	3–1	Sevilla	Barcelona
	Ronaldinho 28' (pen.), 39'; Lionel Messi 80'		Frédéric Kanouté 37'	Stadium: Camp Nou

22 October 2006 7	Real Madrid	2–0	Barcelona	Madrid
	Raúl 3'; Ruud van Nistelrooy 51'			Stadium: Estadio Santiago Bernabéu

28 October 2006 8	Barcelona	3–0	Recreativo Huelva	Barcelona
	Ronaldinho 28' (pen.), 57'; Xavi 60'			Stadium: Camp Nou

4 November 2006 9	Deportivo	1–1	Barcelona	A Coruña
	Juan Rodríguez 73'		Ronaldinho 39' (pen.)	Stadium: Riazor

12 November 2006 10	Barcelona	3–1	Real Zaragoza	Barcelona
	Ronaldinho 30', 86'; Javier Saviola 90'		Gabriel Milito 17'	Stadium: Camp Nou

19 November 2006 11	Mallorca	1–4	Barcelona	Palma de Mallorca
	Víctor 69'		Eiður Guðjohnsen 41', 58'; Santiago Ezquerro 90'; Andrés Iniesta 85'	Stadium: Ono Estadi

25 November 2006 12	Barcelona	4–0	Villarreal	Barcelona
	Ronaldinho 34' (pen.), 88'; Eiður Guðjohnsen 54'; Andrés Iniesta 70'			Stadium: Camp Nou

2 December 2006 13	Levante	1–1	Barcelona	Valencia
	Álvaro 76'		Deco 41'	Stadium: Ciutat de València

9 December 2006 14	Barcelona	1–0	Real Sociedad	Barcelona
	Ronaldinho 60'			Stadium: Camp Nou

21 December 2006 15	Barcelona	1–1	Atlético Madrid	Barcelona
	Ronaldinho 40'		Agüero 60'	Stadium: Camp Nou

7 January 2007 16	Getafe	1–1	Barcelona	Getafe
	Daniel Güiza 54'		Xavi 65'	Stadium: Coliseum Alfonso Pérez

13 January 2007 17	Espanyol	3–1	Barcelona	Barcelona
	Luis García 31'; Raúl Tamudo 66'; Francisco Rufete 90'		Javier Saviola 60'	Stadium: Olímpic Lluís Companys

21 January 2007 18	Barcelona	3–0	Gimnàstic	Barcelona
	Javier Saviola 17'; Ludovic Giuly 67'; Andrés Iniesta 81'			Stadium: Camp Nou

24 January 2007 19	Real Betis	1–1	Barcelona	Sevilla
	Robert 37'		Rafael Márquez 61'	Stadium: Benito Villamarín

28 January 2007 20	Barcelona	3–1	Celta Vigo	Barcelona
	Javier Saviola 34'; Ronaldinho 77' (pen.); Ludovic Giuly 86'		Nenê 66' (pen.)	Stadium: Camp Nou

4 February 2007 21	Osasuna	0–0	Barcelona	Pamplona
				Stadium: Reyno de Navarra

11 February 2007 22	Barcelona	2–0	Racing Santander	Barcelona
	Ronaldinho 51', 67'			Stadium: Camp Nou

18 February 2007 23	Valencia	2–1	Barcelona	Valencia
	Angulo 52'; David Silva 55'		Ronaldinho 90+2'	Stadium: Mestalla

25 February 2007 24	Barcelona	3–0	Athletic Bilbao	Barcelona
	Fernando Amorebieta 23' (o.g.); Xavi 29'; Samuel Eto'o 40'			Stadium: Camp Nou

3 March 2007 25	Sevilla	2–1	Barcelona	Sevilla
	Alexandr Kerzhakov 39'; Dani Alves 60'		Ronaldinho 13'	Stadium: Ramón Sánchez Pizjuán

10 March 2007 26	Barcelona	3–3	Real Madrid	Barcelona
	Lionel Messi 11', 27', 90'		Ruud van Nistelrooy 5', 13' (pen.); Sergio Ramos 73'	Stadium: Camp Nou

17 March 2007 27	Recreativo	0–4	Barcelona	Huelva
			Samuel Eto'o 3', 44'; Gianluca Zambrotta 39'; Lionel Messi 84'	Stadium: Nuevo Colombino

31 March 2007 28	Barcelona	2–1	Deportivo	Barcelona
	Lionel Messi 44'; Samuel Eto'o 51'		Adrián 66'	Stadium: Camp Nou

7 April 2007 29	Real Zaragoza	1–0	Barcelona	Zaragoza
	Diego Milito 57'			Stadium: La Romareda

15 April 2007 30	Barcelona	1–0	Mallorca	Barcelona
	Fernando Navarro 89' (o.g.)			Stadium: Camp Nou

22 April 2007 31	Villarreal	2–0	Barcelona	Vila-real
	Robert Pires 56'; Marquitos 85'			Stadium: El Madrigal

29 April 2007 32	Barcelona	1–0	Levante	Barcelona
	Samuel Eto'o 27'			Stadium: Camp Nou

5 May 2007 33	Real Sociedad	0–2	Barcelona	San Sebastián
			Andrés Iniesta 47'; Samuel Eto'o 87'	Stadium: Anoeta

13 May 2007 34	Barcelona	1–1	Real Betis	Barcelona
	Ronaldinho 5' (pen.)		Rafael Sóbis 90'	Stadium: Camp Nou

20 May 2007 35	Atlético Madrid	0–6	Barcelona	Madrid
			Lionel Messi 39', 80'; Gianluca Zambrotta 43'; Samuel Eto'o 45'; Ronaldinho 58'; Andrés Iniesta 90'	Stadium: Vicente Calderón

26 May 2007 36	Barcelona	1–0	Getafe	Barcelona
	Ronaldinho 2'			Stadium: Camp Nou

9 June 2007 37	Barcelona	2–2	Espanyol	Barcelona
	Lionel Messi 43', 57'		Raúl Tamudo 30', 90'	Stadium: Camp Nou

17 June 2007 38	Gimnàstic	1–5	Barcelona	Tarragona
	Tobias Grahn 83'		Carlos Puyol 20'; Lionel Messi 34', 51'; Ronaldinho 37'; Gianluca Zambrotta 90'	Stadium: Nou Estadi

==== Points evolution ====
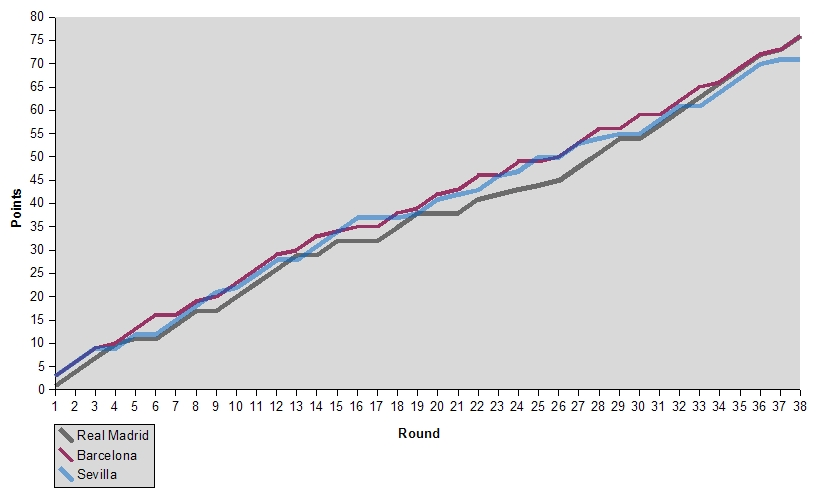

Source: LPF

==== Position evolution ====
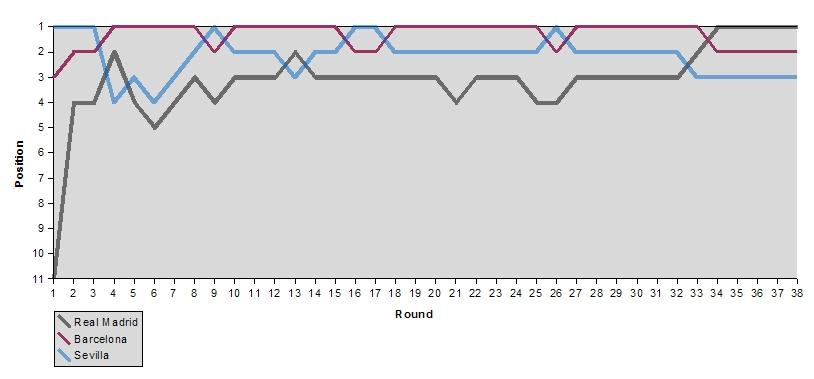

Source: LPF

=== UEFA Champions League ===
==== Group stage ====
Pos	Team	Pld	W	D	L	GF	GA	GD	Pts	Qualification
1	(England) Chelsea	6	4	1	1	10	4	+6	13	Advance to knockout stage
2	(Spain) Barcelona	6	3	2	1	12	4	+8	11	Advance to knockout stage
3	(Germany) Werder Bremen	6	3	1	2	7	5	+2	10	Transfer to UEFA Cup
4	(Bulgaria) Levski Sofia	6	0	0	6	1	17	−16	0	

Source: RSSSF

12 September 2006 1	Barcelona (Spain)	5–0	(Bulgaria) Levski Sofia	Barcelona
20:45 (20:45 UTC+2)	Iniesta 7'; Giuly 39'; Puyol 49'; Eto'o 58'; Ronaldinho 90+3'	Report		Stadium: Camp Nou; Attendance: 91,000; Referee: Konrad Plautz

27 September 2006 2	Werder Bremen (Germany)	1–1	(Spain) Barcelona	Bremen
20:45 (20:45 UTC+2)	Puyol 56' (o.g.)	Report	Messi 89'	Stadium: Weserstadion; Attendance: 41,256; Referee: Roberto Rosetti

18 October 2006 3	Chelsea (England)	1–0	(Spain) Barcelona	London
20:45 (19:45 UTC+1)	Drogba 47'	Report		Stadium: Stamford Bridge; Attendance: 40,599; Referee: Frank De Bleeckere

31 October 2006 4	Barcelona (Spain)	2–2	(England) Chelsea	Barcelona
20:45 (20:45 UTC+1)	Deco 3'; Guðjohnsen 58'	Report	Lampard 52'; Drogba 90+3'	Stadium: Camp Nou; Attendance: 98,000; Referee: Stefano Farina

22 November 2006 5	Levski Sofia (Bulgaria)	0–2	(Spain) Barcelona	Sofia
20:45 (21:45 UTC+2)		Report	Giuly 5'; Iniesta 65'	Stadium: Vasil Levski National Stadium; Attendance: 38,000; Referee: Yuri Baskakov

5 December 2006 6	Barcelona (Spain)	2–0	(Germany) Werder Bremen	Barcelona
20:45 (20:45 UTC+1)	Ronaldinho 13'; Guðjohnsen 18'	Report		Stadium: Camp Nou; Attendance: 95,500; Referee: Massimo Busacca

==== Knockout phase ====
===== Round of 16 =====
21 February 2007 First leg	Barcelona (Spain)	1–2	(England) Liverpool	Barcelona
20:45 (20:45 UTC+1)	Deco 14'	Report	Bellamy 43'; Riise 74'	Stadium: Camp Nou; Attendance: 88,000; Referee: Kyros Vassaras

6 March 2007 Second leg	Liverpool (England)	0–1 (2a–2 agg.)	(Spain) Barcelona	Liverpool
20:45 (19:45 UTC±0)		Report	Guðjohnsen 75'	Stadium: Anfield; Attendance: 45,000; Referee: Herbert Fandel

=== Competitive results ===
Game	Date	Tournament	Round	Ground	Opponent	Score^{1}	Report
1	17 August	Spanish Super Cup	1st leg	A	Espanyol	1–0	Kick off / 22:00 CEST; Attendance / 26,550; Referee / González Vázquez (Spain); Espanyol / Barcelona; (yellow card) 61' Pandiani; (yellow card) 89' Fredson / (yellow card) 26' Motta; 43' Giuly; (yellow card) 58' Xavi
2	20 August	Spanish Super Cup	2nd leg	H	Espanyol	3–0	Kick off / 22:00 CEST; Attendance / 57,512; Referee / Mejuto González (Spain); Barcelona / Espanyol; 3' Xavi; 13' Deco; (yellow card) 42', (goal) 61' Deco / (yellow card) 33' Lacruz; (yellow card) 47' Pandiani; (yellow card) 64' Jarque
3	25 August	UEFA Super Cup		N (Monaco)	Sevilla	0–3	Report / Report link; Kick off / 20:45 CET; Attendance / 17,480; Referee / Stefano Farina (Italy); Barcelona / Sevilla; (yellow card) 47' Sylvinho / 7' Renato; 45', (yellow card) 49' Kanoué; (yellow card) 54' Alves; (yellow card) 60' Navarro; (yellow card) 77' Palop; (yellow card) 85' Escudé; 89', (yellow card) 90' Maresca
4	28 August	La Liga	1	A	Celta de Vigo	3–2	Report / Report link; Kick off / 21:00 CEST; Attendance / 31,000; Referee / Pérez Lasa (Spain); Celta de Vigo / Barcelona; 42' Baiano; 64' López; (yellow card) 43' (yellow-red card) 86' Iriney / (yellow card) 52' Motta; 55' Eto'o; 60' Messi; 87' Guðjohnsen; (yellow card) 90' Iniesta
5	9 September	La Liga	2	H	Osasuna	3–0	Report / Report link; Kick off / 20:00 CEST; Attendance / 63,720; Referee / Rodríguez Santiago (Spain); Barcelona / Osasuna; 1', 27' Eto'o; 36' Messi / (yellow card) 30' Muñoz
6	12 September	UEFA Champions League	Group stage	H	Levski Sofia (Bulgaria)	5–0	Report / Report link; Kick off / 20:45 CEST; Attendance / 62,839; Referee / Konrad Plautz (Austria); Barcelona / Levski Sofia; 7' Iniesta; 39' Giuly; 49' Puyol; 58' Eto'o; 93' Ronaldinho / (yellow card) 64' Ivanov; (yellow card) 74' Milanov
7	17 September	La Liga	3	A	Racing Santander	3–0	Report / Report link; Kick off / 20:00 CEST; Attendance / 19,241; Referee / Velasco Carballo (Spain); Racing Santander / Barcelona; (yellow card) 14' Rubén; (yellow card) 26' Álvarez; (yellow card) 62' Vitolo; (yellow card) 77' Fernández; (yellow card) 82' Juanjo; (red card) 90' Toño / 18', (yellow card) 62' Eto'o; (yellow card) 38' Zambrotta; (yellow card) 81' Oleguer; 82' Giuly; 92' (pen.) Ronaldinho
8	24 September	La Liga	4	H	Valencia	1–1	Report / Report link; Kick off / 21:00 CEST; Attendance / 83,331; Referee / Daudén Ibáñez (Spain); Barcelona / Valencia; (yellow card) 33' Márquez; 48' Iniesta / 16' Villa; (yellow card) 19' Albelda; (yellow card) 38' Moretti; (yellow card) 90' Joaquín
9	27 September	UEFA Champions League	Group stage	A (Germany)	Werder Bremen (Germany)	1–1	Report / Report link; Kick off / 20:45 CEST; Attendance / 37,500; Referee / Roberto Rosetti (Italy); Werder Bremen / Barcelona; (yellow card) 26' Frings; 56' (o.g.) Puyol; (yellow card) 73' Naldo; (yellow card) 86' Baumann / 89' Messi
10	30 September	La Liga	5	A	Athletic Bilbao	3–1	Report / Report link; Kick off / 22:00 CEST; Attendance / 39,000; Referee / Fernández Borbalán (Spain); Athletic Bilbao / Barcelona; 11' Yeste; (red card) 19' Casas / 45+2' Puyol; 60' Guðjohnsen; (yellow card) 68' Messi; 77' Saviola
11	15 October	La Liga	6	H	Sevilla	3–1	Report / Report link; Kick off / 19:00 CEST; Attendance / 91,220; Referee / Muñiz Fernández (Spain); Barcelona / Sevilla; 28' (pen.), 39' Ronaldinho; (yellow card) 72' Motta; 80' Messi / (yellow card) 24' Luís Fabiano; (yellow card) 25' Escudé; (yellow card) 31' Puerta; 37', (yellow card) 81' Kanouté; (yellow card) 70' Palop; (yellow card) 90' Alves
12	18 October	UEFA Champions League	Group stage	A (England)	Chelsea (England)	0–1	Report / Report link; Kick off / 20:45 CEST; Attendance / 40,549; Referee / Frank de Bleeckere (Belgium); Chelsea / Barcelona; 47' Drogba; (yellow card) 52' Lampard / (yellow card) 45' Van Bronckhorst; (yellow card) 65' Xavi; (yellow card) 85' Deco
13	22 October	La Liga	7	A	Real Madrid	0–2	Report / Report link; Kick off / 21:00 CEST; Attendance / 80,000; Referee / Pérez Burrull (Spain); Real Madrid / Barcelona; 2' Raúl; (yellow card) 21' Emerson; 50', (yellow card) 56' Van Nistelrooy; (yellow card) 70' Guti; (yellow card) 86' Beckham / (yellow card) 54' Zambrotta; (yellow card) 82' Ronaldinho
14	25 October	Copa del Rey	Round of 32	A	Badalona	2–1	Kick off / 22:00 CEST; Attendance / 8,000; Referee / Carlos Clos Gómez (Spain); Badalona / Barcelona; 90+3' Tarradellas / (yellow card) 45' Zambrotta; 63', 77' Guðjohnsen
15	28 October	La Liga	8	H	Recreativo	3–0	Report / Report link; Kick off / 20:00 CEST; Attendance / 72,630; Referee / González Vázquez (Spain); Barcelona / Recreativo; (yellow card) 17' Edmílson; 28' (pen.), 56' Ronaldinho; (yellow card) 53' Deco; 59' Xavi / (yellow card) 27' Mario; (yellow card) 73' Vázquez
16	31 October	UEFA Champions League	Group stage	H	Chelsea (England)	2 – 2	
17	4 November	La Liga	9	A	Deportivo La Coruña	1 – 1	
18	8 November	Copa del Rey	Round of 32	H	Badalona	4 – 0	
19	12 November	La Liga	10	H	Zaragoza	3 – 1	
20	19 November	La Liga	11	A	Mallorca	4 – 1	
21	22 November	UEFA Champions League	Group stage	A (Bulgaria)	Levski Sofia (Bulgaria)	2 – 0	
22	25 November	La Liga	12	H	Villarreal	4 – 0	
23	2 December	La Liga	13	A	Levante	1 – 1	
24	5 December	UEFA Champions League	Group stage	H	Werder Bremen (Germany)	2 – 0	
25	9 December	La Liga	14	H	Real Sociedad	1 – 0	
26	14 December	FIFA Club World Cup	Semi-final	N (Japan)	América (Mexico)	4 – 0	
27	17 December	FIFA Club World Cup	Final	N (Japan)	Internacional (Brazil)	0 – 1	
28	21 December	La Liga	15	H	Atlético Madrid	1 – 1	
29	7 January	La Liga	16	A	Getafe	1 – 1	
30	10 January	Copa del Rey	Round of 16	A	Alavés	2 – 0	
31	13 January	La Liga	17	A	Espanyol	1 – 3	
32	16 January	Copa del Rey	Round of 16	H	Alavés	3 – 2	
33	21 January	La Liga	18	H	Gimnàstic	3 – 0	
34	24 January	La Liga	19	A	Betis	1 – 1	
35	28 January	La Liga	20	H	Celta de Vigo	3 – 1	
36	31 January	Copa del Rey	Quarter-final	H	Zaragoza	0 – 1	
37	4 February	La Liga	21	A	Osasuna	0 – 0	
38	11 February	La Liga	22	H	Racing Santander	2 – 0	
39	18 February	La Liga	23	A	Valencia	1 – 2	
40	21 February	UEFA Champions League	Round of 16	H	Liverpool (England)	1 – 2	
41	25 February	La Liga	24	H	Athletic Bilbao	3 – 0	
42	28 February	Copa del Rey	Quarter-final	A	Zaragoza	2 – 1	
43	3 March	La Liga	25	A	Sevilla	1 – 2	
44	6 March	UEFA Champions League	Round of 16	A (England)	Liverpool (England)	1 – 0	
45	10 March	La Liga	26	H	Real Madrid	3 – 3	
46	17 March	La Liga	27	A	Recreativo	4 – 0	
47	31 March	La Liga	28	H	Deportivo La Coruña	2 – 1	
48	7 April	La Liga	29	A	Zaragoza	0 – 1	
49	15 April	La Liga	30	H	Mallorca	1 – 0	
50	18 April	Copa del Rey	Semi-final	H	Getafe	5 – 2	
51	22 April	La Liga	31	A	Villarreal	0 – 2	
52	29 April	La Liga	32	H	Levante	1 – 0	
53	5 May	La Liga	33	A	Real Sociedad	2 – 0	
54	10 May	Copa del Rey	Semi-final	A	Getafe	0 – 4	
55	13 May	La Liga	34	H	Betis	1 – 1	
56	20 May	La Liga	35	A	Atlético Madrid	6 – 0	
57	26 May	La Liga	36	H	Getafe	1 – 0	
58	31 May	Copa Catalunya	Semi-final	A	Gimnàstic	4 – 3	
59	5 June	Copa Catalunya	Final	A	Espanyol	1 – 1 (5–4 pen.)	
60	9 June	La Liga	37	H	Espanyol	2 – 2	
61	17 June	La Liga	38	A	Gimnàstic	5 – 1	

Source: FC Barcelona
^{1}Barcelona goals come first.
National flags for Ground and Opponent columns are only shown when different from that of Barcelona.
M = Match; Ground: H = Home, A = Away, N = Neutral, HR = Home replacement, AR = Away replacement.

=== Friendly ===
Match	Date	Competition or tour	Ground	Opponent	Score^{1}	GD
1	28 Jul 2006	Pre-season	A	AGF	3 - 0	3
2	3 Aug 2006	American Tour	A	UANL	3 - 0	3
3	6 Aug 2006	American Tour	N	Guadalajara	1 - 1	0
4	9 Aug 2006	American Tour	N	América	4 - 4	0
5	12 Aug 2006	American Tour	A	New York Red Bulls	4 - 1	3
6	24 Apr 2007	Friendly	A	Al Ahly	4 - 0	4
7	20 June 2007	Friendly	A	Mamelodi Sundowns	2 - 1	1

Source: FC Barcelona
^{1}Barcelona goals come first.
Country's flag depict country of foreign team to that of Barcelona.
Ground: H = Home; A = Away; N = Neutral; HR = Home replacement; AR = Away replacement; GD = Goal difference

== Results ==
GAMES 2006–2007

22-08-2006 Joan Gamper Trophy BARCELONA-BAYERN MUNICH 4-0

05-09-2006 Copa Catalunya (FINAL) ESPANYOL – BARCELONA 1-0

== See also ==
- FC Barcelona
- 2006–07 UEFA Champions League
- 2006–07 La Liga
- 2006–07 Copa del Rey
