= Luiz Adriano =

Brazilian footballer (born 1987)

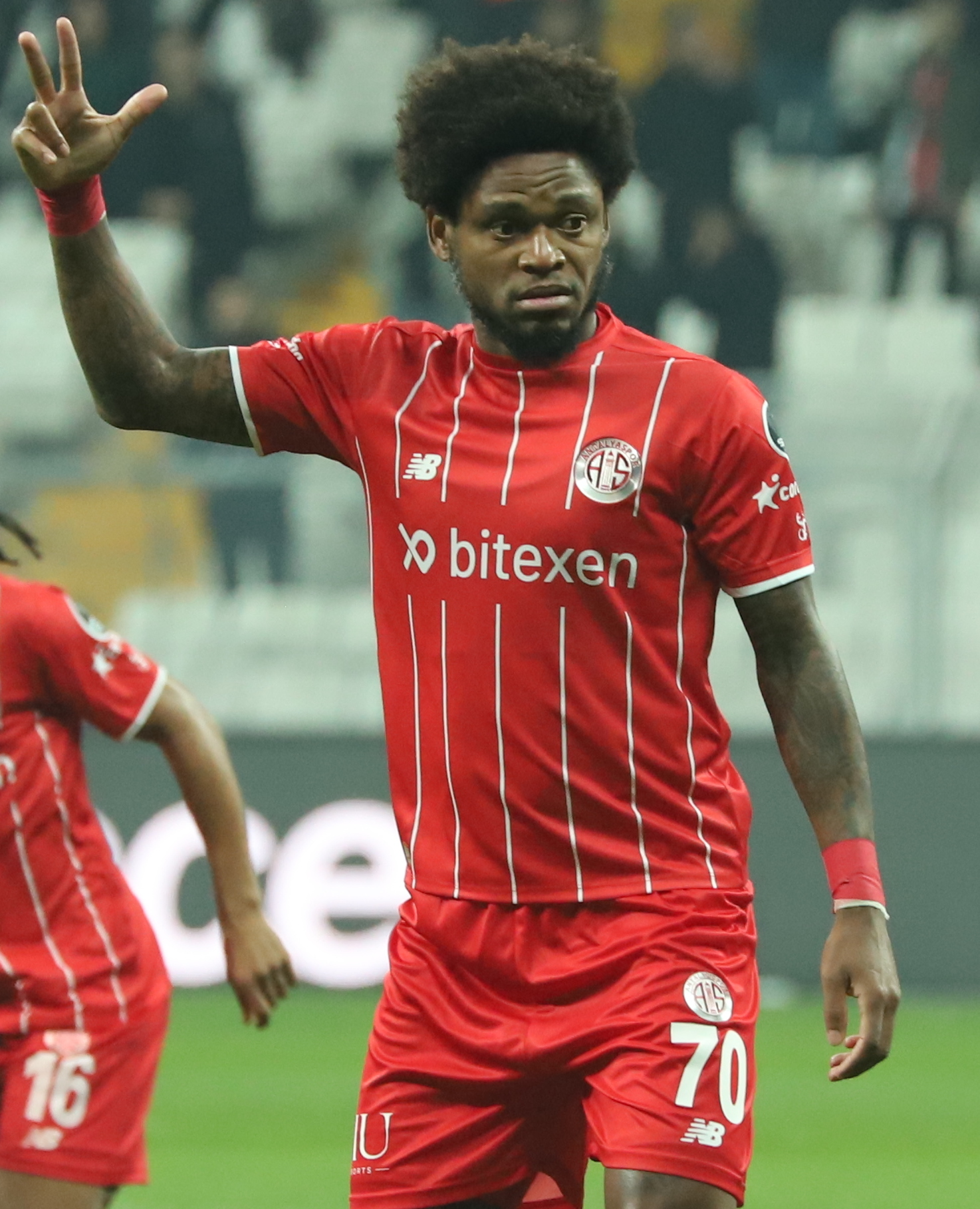
- Luiz Adriano with Antalyaspor in 2022

Personal information
- Full name: Luiz Adriano de Souza da Silva
- Date of birth: 12 April 1987 (age 39)
- Place of birth: Porto Alegre, Brazil
- Height: 1.83 m (6 ft 0 in)
- Position: Striker

Youth career
- 2004–2005: Internacional

Senior career*
Years	Team	Apps	(Gls)
2006–2007	Internacional	15	(1)
2007–2015	Shakhtar Donetsk	162	(77)
2015–2017	Milan	33	(4)
2017–2019	Spartak Moscow	58	(19)
2019–2022	Palmeiras	76	(23)
2022–2023	Antalyaspor	34	(6)
2023–2024	Internacional	37	(4)
2024	Vitória	4	(0)
Total		419	(134)

International career
2007	Brazil U20	11	(2)
2014–2015	Brazil	4	(0)
- * Club domestic league appearances and goals as of 19:16, 18 February 2024 (UTC)

Luiz Adriano de Souza da Silva (born 12 April 1987), or simply Luiz Adriano (Brazilian Portuguese: [luˈiz ˌadɾiˈɐnu]), is a Brazilian former professional footballer.

Born in Porto Alegre, he began his career at hometown club Internacional before joining Shakhtar Donetsk in 2007 for €3 million. He became an integral member of the Ukrainian club, becoming the all-time leading goalscorer for Shakhtar in October 2014 and receiving his first call-up to the Brazil national team the same month.

== Club career ==
=== Internacional ===
Luiz Adriano caught the eye of European clubs with his performances for Internacional in December 2006 at the FIFA Club World Cup. He notably scored the deciding goal for Internacional in their 2–1 win over Al Ahly during the semi-final round of the competition. In the final against European champions Barcelona, Luiz Adriano came on as a late substitute and played a vital role in Adriano Gabiru's 82nd-minute winner.

=== Shakhtar Donetsk ===
Luiz Adriano was transferred to Ukrainian side Shakhtar Donetsk on 2 March 2007 for a reported €3 million transfer fee (R$8,128,830). On 19 March 2007, he made his debut in the Ukrainian Premier League against city rivals Metalurh Donetsk, at the age of 19 years 11 months and 7 days. It took almost one year, however, for Luiz Adriano to score his first goal for the club, netting in the 94th minute of a 4–1 win over Metalist Kharkiv on 15 March 2008.

On 28 August 2008, Adriano scored his first goal in Europe, netting his side's opening goal in their 3–1 second-leg victory over Dinamo Zagreb to secure a place in the group stage of the UEFA Champions League. He scored the opening goal of the 2009 UEFA Cup Final which Shakhtar won 2–1 over Werder Bremen after extra time.

On 16 February 2011, Luiz Adriano scored the winning goal against Roma in a 3–2 away victory during the first leg of the Champions League round of 16. On 7 May 2011, he scored his 50th Shakhtar goal in a 2–0 league win over Metalurh Donetsk.

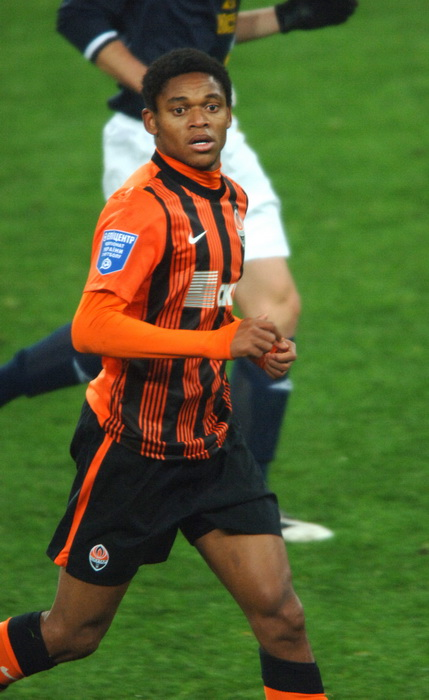
Luiz Adriano in action for Shakhtar in 2011

==== 2012–13 season ====
On 10 July 2012, Luiz Adriano opened the score in the 2012 Ukrainian Super Cup against cup holders Metalurh Donetsk to help Shakhtar claim the trophy after a 2–0 victory. He netted his first goal of the 2012–13 Premier League season in a 3–0 victory over Karpaty Lviv. He scored the last goal in a 3–1 victory over Dynamo Kyiv on 2 September. He scored the third goal in a 3–0 victory over Zorya Luhansk on 15 September, with an assist from compatriot Willian.

On 20 November 2012, playing against Danish team Nordsjælland in the Champions League, Luiz Adriano scored a controversial 1–1 equalizer. After an injury to a Nordsjælland player led to a dropped-ball, Willian attempted to return it to the Nordsjaelland goalkeeper, but Luiz Adriano pounced on the pass, rounded the goalkeeper and finished into an empty net. This led to heavy protests from the Danish players and the crowd. UEFA opened a disciplinary case against Luiz Adriano, later banning him for one game for unsporting behaviour. Shakhtar released a statement backing the UEFA decision and stated that they were deeply disappointed by the player's actions.

==== 2013–14 season ====
Luiz Adriano made his season debut against Chornomorets Odesa in the Ukrainian Super Cup as Shakhtar won 3–1, but the striker failed to get on the scoresheet. He opened his account for the season in Shakhtar's first Ukrainian Premier League fixture, scoring his side's second in the final minute of normal time in a 2–0 victory over Hoverla Uzhhorod on 14 July 2013. He scored once as Shakhtar defeated Real Sociedad 4–0 in their penultimate group match of the Champions League on 27 November 2013. He scored the game's only goal in Shakhtar's next match, a league victory over Chornomorets.

Luiz Adriano scored both of his side's goals in their 2–0 win over Dynamo Kyiv in the Ukrainian derby on 16 April 2014. In Shakhtar's following Premier League match, against city-rivals Metalurh, Luiz Adriano scored the game-winning goal as Shakhtar came from a goal down to win 2–1. On 11 May, Luiz Adriano scored twice as Shakhtar clinched their fifth consecutive league title with a 3–1 win over Zorya Luhansk. In the final league match of the season on 18 May, Luiz Adriano scored both goals as Shakhtar defeated Volyn Lutsk 2–0 to finish as the leading goal-scorer with 20 strikes.

==== 2014–15 season ====
On 30 September 2014, Luiz Adriano put Shakhtar ahead 2–0 with less than five minutes to play against Porto, but the Ukrainian champions relinquished the win as two goals in the final minutes from Jackson Martínez ensured a 2–2 draw. On 17 October, Luiz Adriano scored in either half and provided an assist for Alex Teixeira as Shakhtar defeated Volyn Lutsk 6–2.

On 21 October, playing against Belarusian team BATE Borisov in the Champions League, Luiz Adriano scored five goals, becoming the second player – after Lionel Messi (which would eventually be equalled by Erling Haaland in 2023) – to score five goals in a Champions League match. Adriano's hat-trick took 11 minutes, the third-fastest ever in the competition; he scored three goals in a seven-minute span, the quickest ever, and his four first-half goals were a record for a player in the competition. With his fourth and fifth goals of the match, he overcame Andriy Vorobey to become Shakhtar's all-time leading goalscorer with 117 goals. With his five goals, Adriano also established himself as Shakhtar's all-time leading goalscorer in Europe with 29 goals.

In Shakhtar's next Champions League match, hosting BATE on 5 November, Luiz Adriano scored another hat-trick, starting with a 58th-minute penalty, as his team won 5–0. In doing so, he became the first-ever player to score back-to-back hat-tricks in the competition.

In the 2014–15 Champions League group stage, Shakhtar finished second in its group, therefore qualifying for the knockout phase. In the six games played, Luiz Adriano equalled Messi's record of five goals in a Champions League match and equalled Cristiano Ronaldo's record of scoring nine goals in the group stage, prompting UEFA to name him the best player of the season's Champions League group stage phase.

=== Milan ===
On 2 July 2015, Luiz Adriano signed for Milan on a five-year deal for a transfer fee of €8 million. Milan, however, also paid an additional €6 million to unknown parties. He made his debut on 17 August in the third round of the Coppa Italia, scoring the second goal of a 2–0 win over Perugia at the San Siro. He scored his first goal in Serie A on 29 August 2015 in a 2–1 home win against Empoli. In January 2016, Milan agreed an offer from Chinese Super League side Jiangsu Suning to sell Luiz Adriano for a reported fee of €14 million. The deal, however, could not be completed after Luiz Adriano and Jiangsu Suning failed to agree on personal terms during negotiations.

=== Spartak Moscow ===
On 16 January 2017, he signed a long-term contract with FC Spartak Moscow.

=== Palmeiras ===
On 30 July 2019, he signed with Palmeiras on a four-year deal. On 3 November 2020, he scored his first hat-trick for the club in a 3–1 win over Guarani.

Luiz Adriano won back-to-back Copa Libertadores titles in 2020 and 2021 with Palmeiras, beating Santos and Flamengo respectively.

=== Antalyaspor ===
Luiz Adriano was transferred to Antalyaspor on 4 February 2022 and signed a one-and-a-half-year contract.

=== Return to Internacional ===
On 22 February 2023, Luiz Adriano officially returned to his first club Internacional, signing a contract until June 2024.

== International career ==
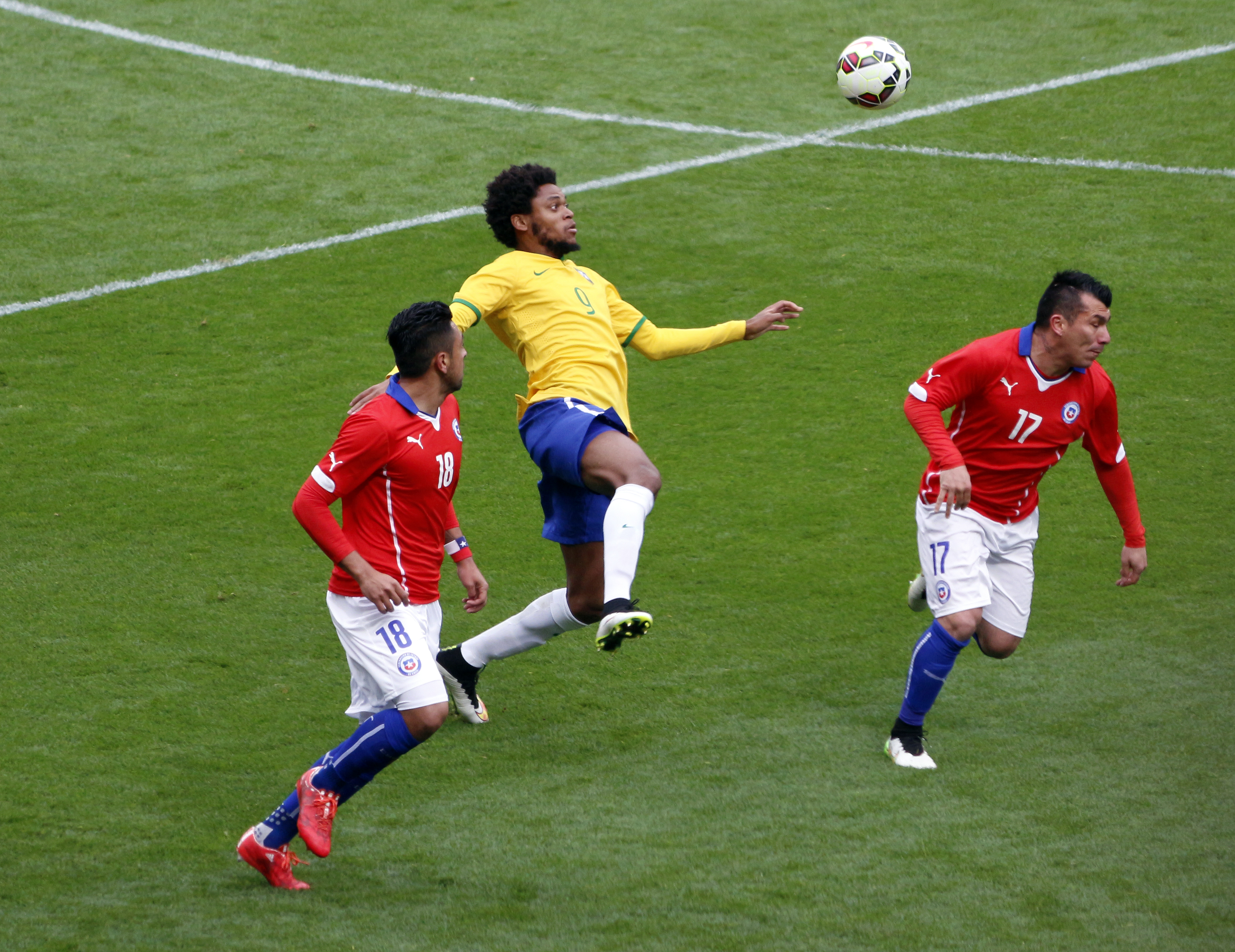
Luiz Adriano playing for Brazil in a friendly vs Chile in 2015

In March 2013, Luiz Adriano indicated that he would be likely to accept a call-up for Ukraine national team if asked. He did not, however, have a Ukrainian passport when he was representing Brazil youth team, which made him ineligible to countries other than Brazil (or his ancestral countries).

On 23 October 2014, Luiz Adriano was called up to the Brazil national team for the first time for friendlies against Turkey and Austria in November. He debuted on 12 November against Turkey, playing 73 minutes of a 4–0 win before being replaced by fellow debutant Roberto Firmino.

== Style of play ==
Although he is capable of playing in other offensive positions, Luiz Adriano usually plays as a main striker, and is known for his technique, consistency, and composure in front of goal. A quick player who can score with both feet, he is also capable of using his physique to hold up the ball with his back to goal in order to bring his teammates into play. He is also known for his positional sense and ability to play off the last defender and make attacking runs to beat the offside trap.

According to Luiz Adriano's former coach Mircea Lucescu at Shakhtar, "He is one of those players, who rarely gets injured. He is a powerful footballer; he plays great in the air. Despite the fact that he is not tall, Adriano plays as if his height is about two meters! He fights for the ball in the penalty area, always looking for opportunities to net a goal. He is a proper striker."

== Personal life ==
Luiz Adriano's father worked as a security guard at a chemical plant, and his mother was a housewife. His parents are divorced. He has two brothers, Murillo, who is also a footballer, and Fabiano, and two sisters, Patricia and Caroline. His childhood idols include Romário and Ronaldo. He has four tattoos, one on his hand, one on his back, one on his arm and one on his neck.

== Career statistics ==
=== Club ===
As of match played 20 April 2023

Appearances and goals by club, season and competition
Club	Season	League			State league (Note: Includes Campeonato Gaúcho, Campeonato Paulista)		National cup (Note: Includes Ukrainian Cup, Coppa Italia, Russian Cup, Copa do Brasil, Turkish Cup)		Continental		Other		Total	
Club	Season	Division	Apps	Goals	Apps	Goals	Apps	Goals	Apps	Goals	Apps	Goals	Apps	Goals
Internacional	2006	Série A	12	0	2	1	—		0	0	2 (Note: Appearances in FIFA Club World Cup)	1	16	2
Internacional	2007	Série A	0	0	1	0	—		1 (Note: Appearance(s) in Copa Libertadores)	0	—		2	0
Internacional	Total		12	0	3	1	—		1	0	2	1	18	2
Shakhtar Donetsk	2006–07	Ukrainian Premier League	5	0	—		1	0	—		—		6	0
Shakhtar Donetsk	2007–08	Ukrainian Premier League	13	4	—		5	1	1 (Note: Appearance(s) in UEFA Champions League)	0	—		19	5
Shakhtar Donetsk	2008–09	Ukrainian Premier League	12	4	—		3	1	14 (Note: Six appearances and one goal in UEFA Champions League, eight appearances and three goals in UEFA Cup)	4	—		29	9
Shakhtar Donetsk	2009–10	Ukrainian Premier League	23	11	—		1	0	11 (Note: Two appearances in UEFA Champions League, nine appearances and six goals in UEFA Europa League)	6	1 (Note: Appearance in UEFA Super Cup)	0	36	17
Shakhtar Donetsk	2010–11	Ukrainian Premier League	21	10	—		5	4	10	4	1 (Note: Appearance in Ukrainian Super Cup)	2	37	20
Shakhtar Donetsk	2011–12	Ukrainian Premier League	23	12	—		5	1	6	3	1	0	35	16
Shakhtar Donetsk	2012–13	Ukrainian Premier League	19	7	—		5	4	7	3	1	1	32	15
Shakhtar Donetsk	2013–14	Ukrainian Premier League	25	20	—		5	2	8 (Note: Six appearances and one goal in UEFA Champions League, two appearances and two goals in UEFA Europa League)	3	1	0	39	25
Shakhtar Donetsk	2014–15	Ukrainian Premier League	21	9	—		4	3	7	9	1	0	33	21
Shakhtar Donetsk	Total		162	77	—		34	16	64	32	6	3	266	128
Milan	2015–16	Serie A	26	4	—		3	2	—		—		29	6
Milan	2016–17	Serie A	7	0	—		0	0	—		0	0	7	0
Milan	Total		33	4	—		3	2	—		0	0	36	6
Spartak Moscow	2016–17	Russian Premier League	8	2	—		0	0	0	0	0	0	8	2
Spartak Moscow	2017–18	Russian Premier League	25	10	—		4	1	8 (Note: Six appearances and one goal in UEFA Champions League, two appearances and two goals in UEFA Europa League)	3	1 (Note: Appearance in Russian Super Cup)	1	38	15
Spartak Moscow	2018–19	Russian Premier League	22	6	—		2	0	5 (Note: Two appearances in UEFA Champions League, three appearances and one goal in UEFA Europa League)	1	0	0	29	7
Spartak Moscow	2019–20	Russian Premier League	3	1	—		0	0	0	0	0	0	3	1
Spartak Moscow	Total		58	19	—		6	1	13	4	1	1	78	25
Palmeiras	2019	Série A	13	6	—		—		2	1	—		15	7
Palmeiras	2020	Série A	24	10	14	3	7	2	7	5	2	0	54	20
Palmeiras	2021	Série A	19	3	6	1	2	0	7	1	1 (Note: Appearance in Recopa Sudamericana)	0	35	5
Palmeiras	Total		56	19	20	4	9	2	16	7	3	0	104	32
Antalyaspor	2021–22	Süper Lig	15	4	—		1	0	—		—		16	4
Antalyaspor	2022–23	Süper Lig	19	2	—		3	2	—		—		22	4
Antalyaspor	Total		34	6	—		4	2	—		—		38	8
Internacional	2023	Série A	0	0	4	1	1	0	2	0	0	0	7	1
Career total			355	125	27	6	57	23	96	43	12	5	547	202

=== International ===
Appearances and goals by national team and year
National team	Year	Apps	Goals
Brazil	2014	2	0
Brazil	2015	2	0
Total		4	0

== Honours ==
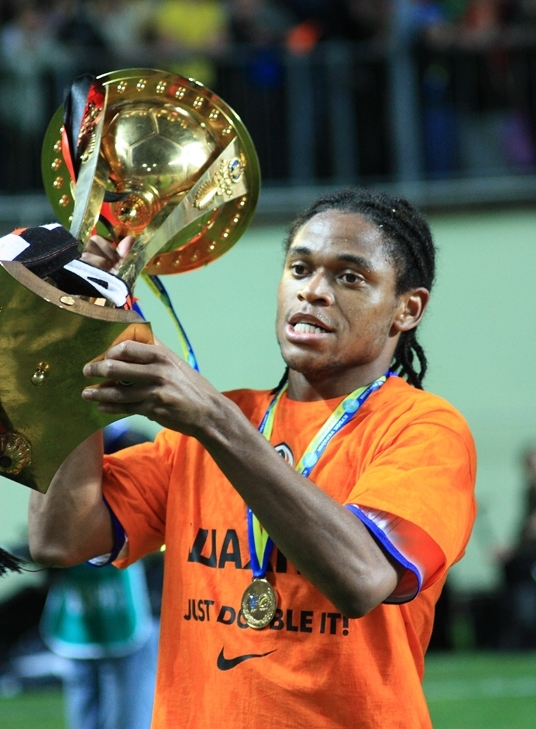
Adriano holding the Ukrainian Cup in 2011

Internacional

- FIFA Club World Cup: 2006

Shakhtar Donetsk

- Ukrainian Premier League: 2007–08, 2009–10, 2010–11, 2011–12, 2012–13, 2013–14
- Ukrainian Cup: 2007–08, 2010–11, 2011–12, 2012–13
- Ukrainian Super Cup: 2008, 2010, 2012, 2013, 2014
- UEFA Cup: 2008–09

Milan

- Supercoppa Italiana: 2016

Spartak Moscow

- Russian Premier League: 2016–17
- Russian Super Cup: 2017

Palmeiras

- Copa do Brasil: 2020
- Copa Libertadores: 2020, 2021
- Campeonato Paulista: 2020

Brazil U20

- South American Youth Championship: 2007

Individual

- Ukrainian Cup top scorer: 2012–13
- Ukrainian Premier League top scorer: 2013–14
- UEFA Champions League Group Stage MVP: 2014–15
- Copa Libertadores Team of the year: 2020
- Oleh Blokhin club: 128 goals
