= 2006 Supercopa de España =

Espanyol	Barcelona
0	4
- on aggregate

First leg
Espanyol	Barcelona
0	1
- Date: 17 August 2006
- Venue: Estadi Olímpic Lluís Companys, Barcelona
- Referee: Bernardino González Vázquez
- Attendance: 22,650

Second leg
Barcelona	Espanyol
3	0
- Date: 20 August 2006
- Venue: Camp Nou, Barcelona
- Referee: Manuel Mejuto González
- Attendance: 57,000

The 2006 Supercopa de España was a two-leg Spanish football match played on 17 and 20 August 2006. It was contested by 2005–06 La Liga champions Barcelona and 2005–06 Copa del Rey winners Espanyol. Barcelona won 4–0 on aggregate.

== Match details ==
=== First leg ===
17 August 2006
22:00 CET

Espanyol	0–1	Barcelona
	Report	Giuly 43'

Estadi Olímpic Lluís Companys, Barcelona
Attendance: 26,550
Referee: González Vázquez

Espanyol	Barcelona

GK	1	(Spain) Gorka Iraizoz
RB	8	(Argentina) Pablo Zabaleta
CB	21	(Spain) Daniel Jarque (c)
CB	4	(Spain) Jesús Lacruz	(yellow card) 89'
LB	3	(Spain) David García
RM	18	(Spain) Francisco Rufete		(substituted off) 61'
CM	6	(Brazil) Eduardo Costa
LM	15	(Brazil) Fredson	(yellow card) 88'
AM	9	(Spain) Iván de la Peña		(substituted off) 67'
CF	23	(Spain) Raúl Tamudo		(substituted off) 52'
CF	10	(Spain) Luis García
Substitutions:
FW	7	(Uruguay) Walter Pandiani	(yellow card) 61'	(substituted on) 52'
FW	20	(Spain) Coro		(substituted on) 61'
MF	11	(Spain) Albert Riera		(substituted on) 67'
Manager:
(Spain) Ernesto Valverde

GK	1	(Spain) Víctor Valdés
RB	23	(Spain) Oleguer
CB	4	(Mexico) Rafael Márquez
CB	5	(Spain) Carles Puyol (c)		(substituted off) 83'
LB	16	(Brazil) Sylvinho
CM	6	(Spain) Xavi	(yellow card) 58'	(substituted off) 61'
CM	3	(Brazil) Thiago Motta	(yellow card) 26'
AM	20	(Portugal) Deco
RW	8	(France) Ludovic Giuly		(substituted off) 59'
CF	9	(Cameroon) Samuel Eto'o
LW	10	(Brazil) Ronaldinho
Substitutions:
FW	19	(Argentina) Lionel Messi		(substituted on) 59'
MF	24	(Spain) Andrés Iniesta		(substituted on) 61'
DF	11	(Italy) Gianluca Zambrotta		(substituted on) 83'
Manager:
(Netherlands) Frank Rijkaard

=== Second leg ===
20 August 2006
22:00 CET

Barcelona	3–0	Espanyol
Xavi 2'; Deco 12', 62'	Report

Camp Nou, Barcelona
Attendance: 57,512
Referee: Mejuto González

Barcelona	Espanyol

GK	25	(Spain) Albert Jorquera
RB	2	(Brazil) Juliano Belletti
CB	4	(Mexico) Rafael Márquez		(substituted off) 46'
CB	5	(Spain) Carles Puyol (c)
LB	12	(Netherlands) Giovanni van Bronckhorst
CM	6	(Spain) Xavi
CM	3	(Brazil) Thiago Motta	(yellow card) 42'	(substituted off) 68'
AM	20	(Portugal) Deco
RW	19	(Argentina) Lionel Messi
CF	9	(Cameroon) Samuel Eto'o		(substituted off) 46'
LW	10	(Brazil) Ronaldinho
Substitutions:
DF	21	(France) Lilian Thuram		(substituted on) 46'
FW	7	(Iceland) Eiður Guðjohnsen		(substituted on) 46'
MF	24	(Spain) Andrés Iniesta		(substituted on) 68'
Manager:
(Netherlands) Frank Rijkaard

GK	13	(Cameroon) Carlos Kameni
RB	5	(Spain) Sergio Sánchez
CB	21	(Spain) Daniel Jarque (c)	(yellow card) 65'
CB	4	(Spain) Jesús Lacruz	(yellow card) 34'	(substituted off) 57'
LB	8	(Argentina) Pablo Zabaleta
RM	18	(Spain) Francisco Rufete
CM	6	(Brazil) Eduardo Costa
CM	15	(Brazil) Fredson	(yellow card) 88'
LM	17	(Morocco) Moha		(substituted off) 63'
CF	20	(Spain) Coro		(substituted off) 57'
CF	7	(Uruguay) Walter Pandiani	(yellow card) 47'
Substitutions:
DF	19	(Spain) Marc Torrejón		(substituted on) 57'
FW	10	(Spain) Luis García		(substituted on) 57'
MF	11	(Spain) Albert Riera		(substituted on) 63'
Manager:
(Spain) Ernesto Valverde

== See also ==
- Derbi barceloní
- 2006–07 La Liga
- 2006–07 Copa del Rey
- 2006–07 FC Barcelona season
- 2006–07 RCD Espanyol season
