= Jean-Paul van Gastel =

Dutch football manager (born 1972)

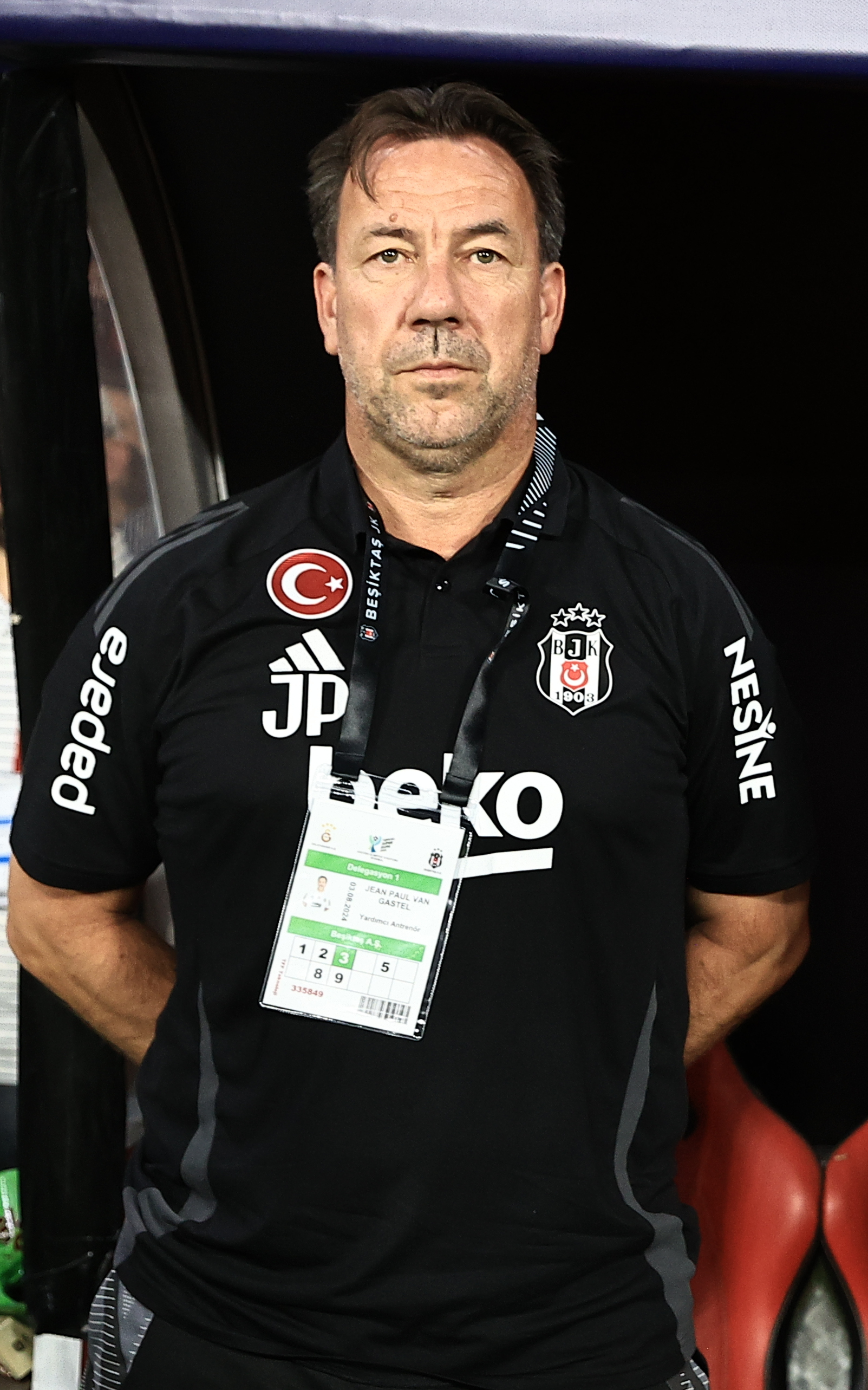
- Jean-Paul van Gastel in the 2024 Turkish Super Cup

Personal information
- Full name: Jacobus Johannes Martinus Paulus van Gastel
- Date of birth: 28 April 1972 (age 54)
- Place of birth: Breda, Netherlands
- Height: 1.78 m (5 ft 10 in)
- Position: Midfielder

Youth career
- BSV Boeimeer
- NAC Breda
- Willem II

Senior career*
Years	Team	Apps	(Gls)
1990–1996	Willem II	137	(15)
1996–2001	Feyenoord	121	(25)
2001–2002	Ternana	7	(0)
2002	Como	0	(0)
2002–2003	De Graafschap	13	(2)
Total		278	(42)

International career
1992-1993	Netherlands U21	10	(1)
1996–1999	Netherlands	5	(2)

Managerial career
- 2021–2022: Guangzhou City
- 2023–2024: NAC
- 2025–2026: PSIM Yogyakarta
- * Club domestic league appearances and goals

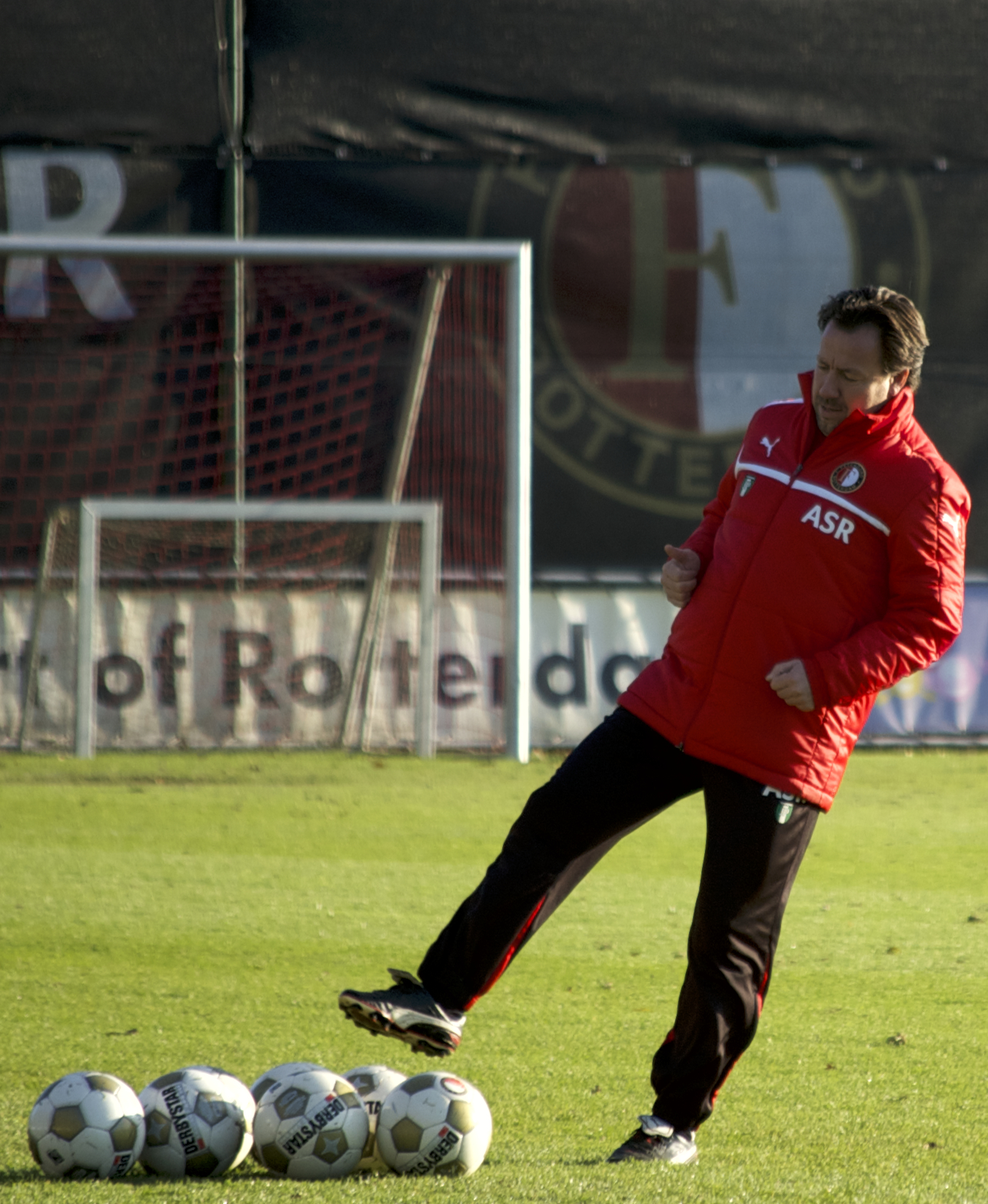

Jacobus Johannes Martinus Paulus "Jean-Paul" van Gastel (Dutch pronunciation: [ʑɑ̃ːˈpʌul vɑŋ ˈɣɑstəl]; born 28 April 1972) is a Dutch professional football manager and former player who played as a midfielder.

== Club career ==
Van Gastel started his professional career in 1990 with Willem II, where he stayed for six seasons, before moving to Feyenoord. There he formed a formidable midfield pair with Paul Bosvelt and won the 1999 Dutch league title. After recovering from a heavy injury, he lost his place in the starting line-up and he subsequently moved to Italy in 2001 and played for Ternana (Serie B) and Como (Serie A). He ended his career in 2003 with De Graafschap. Van Gastel, who became national champion with Feyenoord in 1999, was approached by AS Roma the following summer with a very high offer to bring him to Italy, but Feyenoord did not want to lose him.

== International career ==
Van Gastel played 10 games (1 goal) for the Netherlands national under-21 football team and made his senior debut for the Netherlands in an August 1996 friendly match against Brazil and earned a total of 5 caps, scoring 2 goals. His final international game was also against Brazil, in 1999.

== Managerial career ==
In the end as a player, he worked from 2004 to 2005 as Head Coach of the U-19 team of Willem II. On 30 June 2005, he began his coaching career with the U-19 of Feyenoord.

During his stint at Feyenoord as an assistant coach, he alongside Giovanni van Bronckhorst won five trophies at the De Kuip, including an Eredivisie and KNVB Cup.

Then in 2020, he joined alongside Giovanni van Bronckhorst in joining Guangzhou R&F as an assistant coach. After that season, he became head coach of the club after van Bronckhorst's resignation.

In the 2021 season of the Chinese Super League, he led Guangzhou City to a ninth-place finish in the regular standings and a seventh-place finish in the championship round. Including notable matches versus Qingdao 4–2, Beijing Guoan 5–0, and their city rivals, Guangzhou by 2–2 and 3–3 respectively.

On 11 May 2022, his Twitter account announced that he penned a one-year extension for Guangzhou City.

On 25 September 2023, van Gastel was appointed to the head coach position of NAC Breda, replacing Peter Hyballa.

On 1 July 2024, van Gastel joined van Bronckhorst once again for the third time as his assistant coach for Turkish side Beşiktaş until 30 November 2024, where the latter was sacked following the team's defeat by Israeli team Maccabi Tel Aviv in the Europa League.

On 17 June 2025, Indonesia club PSIM Yogyakarta announced the signing of van Gastel as their new head coach.

On 16 October 2026, the club announced the departure of head coach Jean Paul van Gastel after five consecutive matches without a win in the 2026–27 Super League.

== Managerial statistics ==
As of 17 October 2026

Managerial record by team and tenure
Team	Nat.	From	To	Record					Ref.
Team	Nat.	From	To	G	W	D	L	Win %	Ref.
Guangzhou City	(China)	31 January 2021	28 August 2022	33	8	9	16	24.24	
NAC Breda	(Netherlands)	25 September 2023	5 June 2024	38	17	11	10	44.74	
PSIM Yogyakarta	(Indonesia)	17 June 2025	17 October 2026	39	11	13	15	28.21	
Career Total				110	36	33	41	32.73	

== Honours ==
=== Player ===
- Feyenoord
  - Eredivisie: 1998–99
  - Johan Cruyff Shield: 1999

=== Manager ===
Feyenoord

- Eredivisie: 2016–17
- KNVB Cup: 2015–16, 2017–18
- Johan Cruyff Shield: 2017, 2018
