= Giovanni van Bronckhorst =

Dutch football player and manager (born 1975)

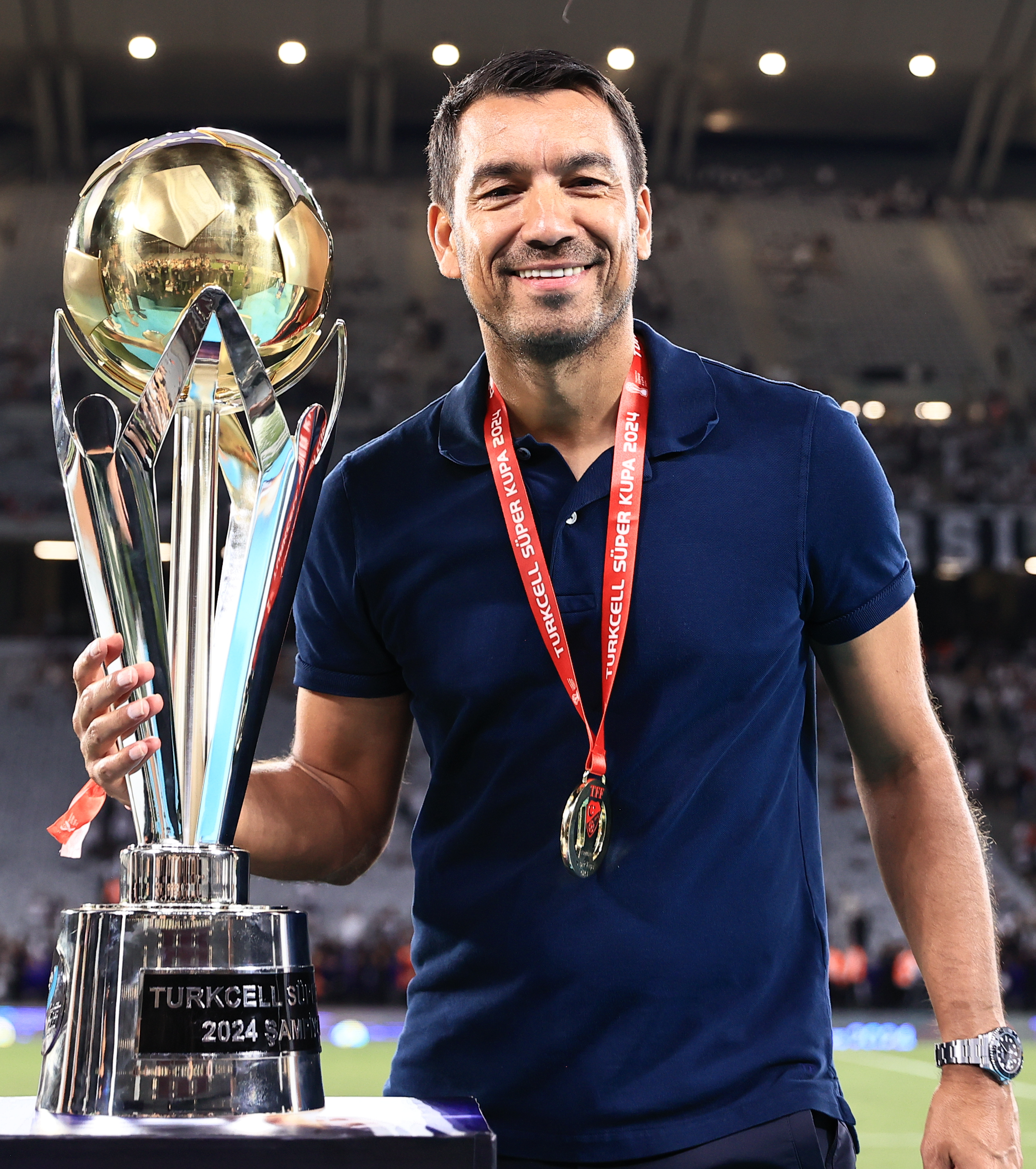
- Van Bronckhorst celebrating the Turkish Super Cup as manager of Beşiktaş in 2024

Personal information
- Full name: Giovanni Christiaan van Bronckhorst
- Date of birth: 5 February 1975 (age 51)
- Place of birth: Rotterdam, Netherlands
- Height: 1.78 m (5 ft 10 in)
- Positions: Left-back; defensive midfielder

Team information
- Current team: Feyenoord (head coach)

Youth career
- 1981–1982: RVV LMO
- 1982–1993: Feyenoord

Senior career*
Years	Team	Apps	(Gls)
1993–1998	Feyenoord	103	(22)
1993–1994	→ RKC Waalwijk (loan)	12	(2)
1998–2001	Rangers	73	(13)
2001–2003	Arsenal	41	(2)
2003–2007	Barcelona	105	(5)
2007–2010	Feyenoord	88	(8)
Total		422	(52)

International career
1996–2010	Netherlands	106	(6)

Managerial career
- 2015–2019: Feyenoord
- 2020: Guangzhou R&F
- 2021–2022: Rangers
- 2024: Beşiktaş
- 2026–: Feyenoord
Medal record
Representing Netherlands
Men's football
FIFA World Cup
Runner-up	2010
UEFA European Championship
Bronze medal – third place	2000
Bronze medal – third place	2004
- * Club domestic league appearances and goals

Giovanni Christiaan van Bronckhorst (born 5 February 1975) is a Dutch football manager and former player. Originally a midfielder, he moved to left-back later in his career. He is currently the head coach of Eredivisie club Feyenoord.

During his club career, Van Bronckhorst played for RKC Waalwijk, Feyenoord, Rangers, Arsenal, Barcelona and again with Feyenoord. He was an instrumental player in Barcelona's 2005–06 UEFA Champions League victory, being in the starting line-up of the final, having played every Champions League match for Barcelona that season.

Van Bronckhorst earned 106 caps for the Netherlands national team, and played for his country in three FIFA World Cups, in 1998, 2006 and 2010, as well as three UEFA European Championships, in 2000, 2004 and 2008. After captaining the Oranje in the 2010 World Cup final, he was elected into the Order of Orange-Nassau. The 2010 World Cup final was the last match in his career.

After assisting the Dutch under-21 team and Feyenoord, Van Bronckhorst became Feyenoord manager in May 2015. He won the KNVB Cup in his first season and the club's first Eredivisie title for 18 years in 2017. In November 2021, he returned to Rangers as manager, reaching the Europa League final and winning the Scottish Cup in his first season. In June 2024, he signed a deal with Beşiktaş and won the 2024 Turkish Super Cup in his first official match.

== Club career ==
=== Early career ===
Van Bronckhorst began playing for a local amateur youth team in Rotterdam, Linker Maas Oever, from age six. He joined the youth academy at Feyenoord the following year. In 1990, aged 15, the club offered him a professional contract, which he accepted. He won the Dutch Youth League with Feyenoord in 1991, but struggled to break into the first team. He was loaned out to RKC Waalwijk, making his league debut in 1993. He returned to Feyenoord for the 1994–95 season, but was used as a fringe player, making only ten appearances for the club. 1995–96 was his breakthrough season, as he started almost every match for Feyenoord, playing alongside the likes of Regi Blinker, Jean-Paul van Gastel and Henrik Larsson.

Domestically, with Feyenoord failing to break the PSV–Ajax stranglehold on the Eredivisie for the fourth-straight year, and major players such as Henrik Larsson leaving the team, Van Bronckhorst began to search for a new club. He chose to join Dick Advocaat (his former manager at international U-16 and U-18 level) at Rangers, joining the club in 1998 for a reported transfer fee between £5–5.5 million.

=== Rangers ===
In Van Bronckhorst's first competitive game for Rangers on 22 July 1998, he scored as they came from 3–0 down to win 5–3 over League of Ireland side Shelbourne at Prenton Park in the first qualifying round of the UEFA Cup. He went on to score 22 goals for Rangers (13 in the league, three in the Scottish Cup, one in the Scottish League Cup, three in the UEFA Champions League and two in the UEFA Cup), mostly in midfield, before joining Arsenal for a fee of £8.5 million, signing a five-year contract.

One of his goals was in the 2000 Scottish Cup Final which Rangers won 4–0 against Aberdeen. Opposition goalkeeper Jim Leighton was injured in the third minute without a substitute available, and striker Robbie Winters had to take his position. He was shortlisted for SPFA Player of the Year in 2000. He injured his groin on international duty that October, and returned on 3 March 2001 against Heart of Midlothian, playing for just 23 minutes of the 2–0 home win before being injured by Colin Cameron.

=== Arsenal ===
Arsène Wenger had signed Van Bronckhorst in June 2001 for £8 million. He sought to replace the midfield void from by the departure of Emmanuel Petit from Arsenal, and so partnered Patrick Vieira in the centre. However, Van Bronckhorst's start at Highbury was marked by a cruciate knee ligament injury which saw him sidelined after only a few months at the club. Despite this, Van Bronckhorst went on to win the Premier League title in 2001–02, and the FA Cup in 2001–02 and 2002–03 with Arsenal. In all, he made 64 appearances for the Gunners, scoring twice.

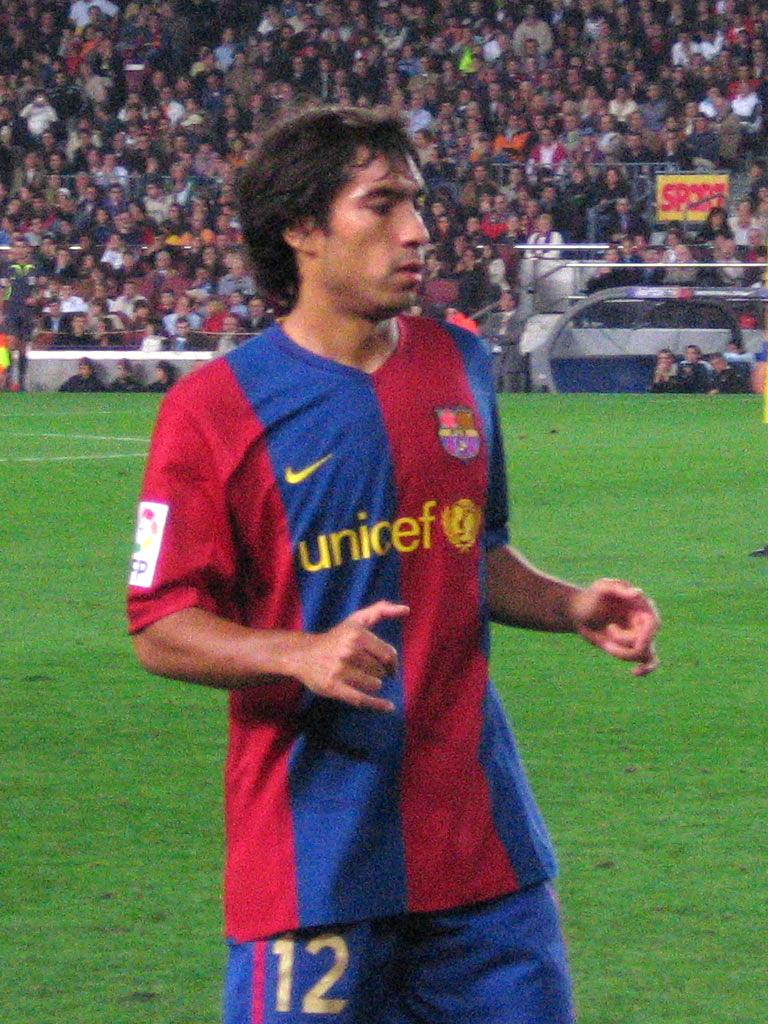
With Barcelona in 2006

=== Barcelona ===
As the 2003–04 season approached, Van Bronckhorst had the opportunity to move to Barcelona and work with its new head coach Frank Rijkaard on a one-year loan, with a view to a permanent transfer.

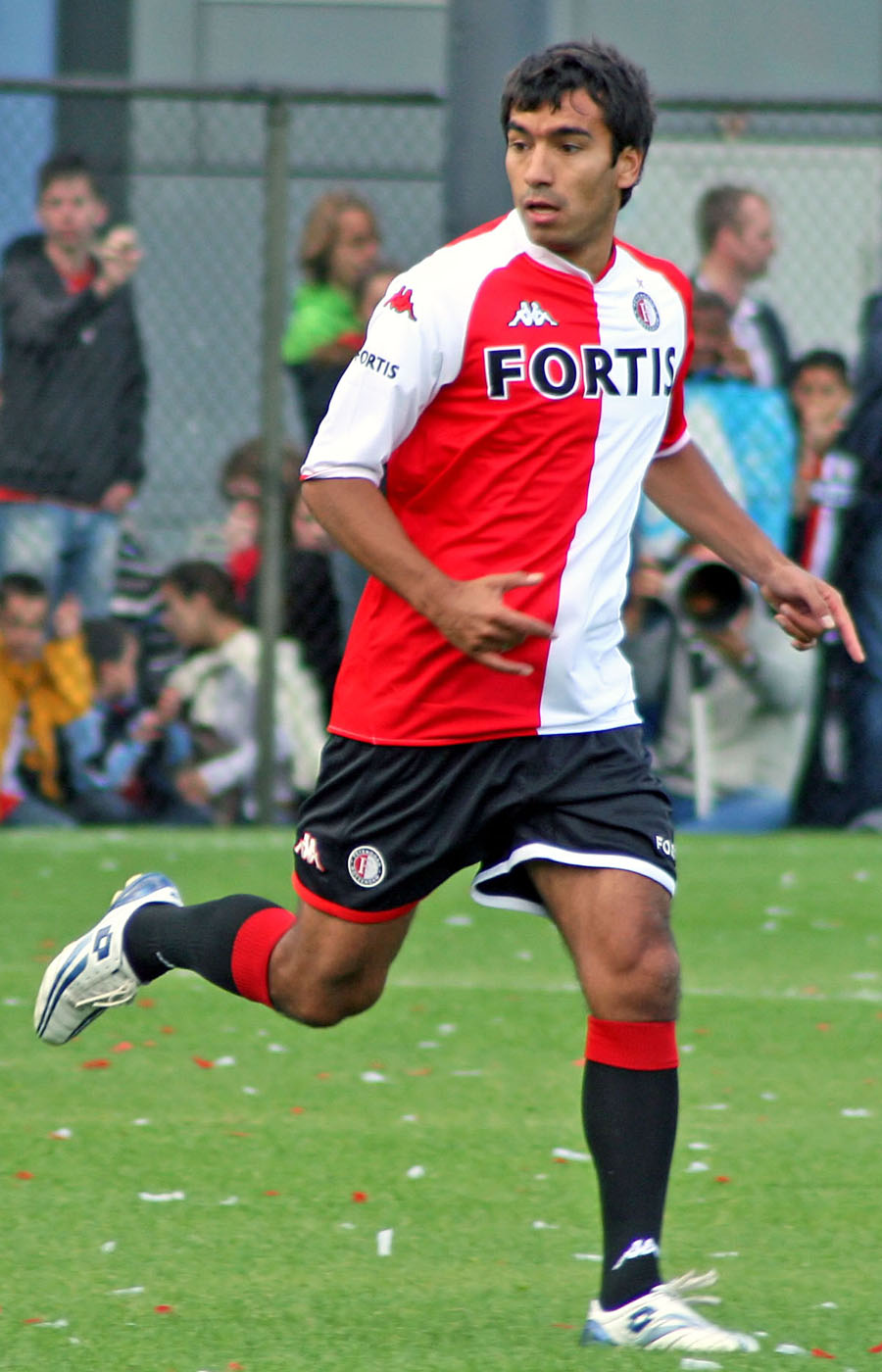
Van Bronckhorst at Feyenoord in 2007

After adapting to his new role as a left-back, he helped Barça to a revival in the second half of the season. In May 2004, Van Bronckhorst completed his move from Arsenal to Barcelona for a fee of €2 million, signing a three-year deal. He won the Liga title in the 2004–05 season after some of his finest displays together with four goals to his credit. In 2005–06, he helped his club repeat as Liga champions while winning the 2005–06 UEFA Champions League as well (he was the only player who participated in all Champions League matches that season). In Spain, he used "Gio" as the name on his shirt.

=== Return to Feyenoord ===
Van Bronckhorst had a year remaining on his Barcelona contract in 2007, but returned to Feyenoord on 27 June 2007 due to a clause in his contract stipulating he could join Feyenoord on a free transfer. Shortly after, head coach Bert van Marwijk made him captain of the club. He would go on to become a pivotal member of the squad, providing stability in an injury-hit side. At the end of his first season, he led "De Stadionclub" to win the 2007–08 KNVB Cup following a 2–0 victory in the final against Roda JC.

== International career ==
=== Early years ===
Van Bronckhorst made his debut for the national Olympic team in 1996, although the Netherlands failed to qualify for the 1996 Olympic Games in Atlanta. He was given his first full international cap in August 1996, being given a starting place by Guus Hiddink in the Oranje lineup to face Brazil in a friendly at the Amsterdam Arena. Van Bronckhorst scored his first goal for Ons Oranje in August 1996 at the FNB Stadium against South Africa. He was part of the Netherlands squad for the 1998 FIFA World Cup, but did not play during the tournament. He only saw limited action in Euro 2000 on home soil, as cover for left-back Arthur Numan.

=== Euro 2004 and 2006 World Cup ===
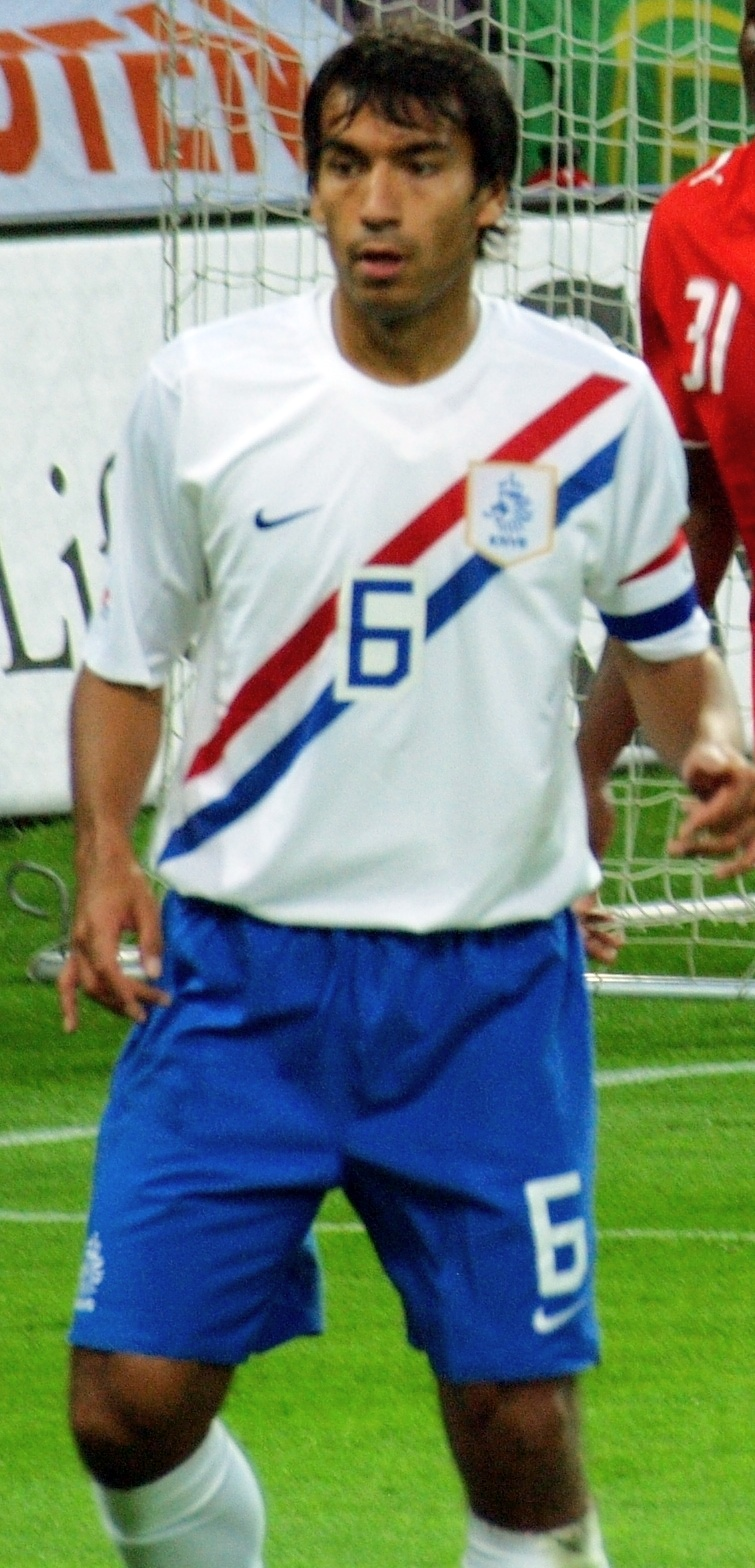
Van Bronckhorst as captain of the Netherlands in 2007

Van Bronckhorst (who was regularly played as a midfielder at club level at the time) was deployed by manager Dick Advocaat as a left-back at Euro 2004. The Netherlands reached the semi-finals of the tournament, only to fall to hosts Portugal.

Van Bronckhorst was a regular in the national team for the 2006 World Cup qualification campaign. In the round of 16 match against Portugal (see Battle of Nuremberg), he received a red card in a match that saw four red cards given, a World Cup record.

=== Euro 2008 ===
Van Bronckhorst scored in a Euro 2008 qualifying match against Slovenia on 28 March 2007. The Netherlands went on to win the match by 1–0.

On 9 June 2008, in a group match against Italy, he cleared the ball off his own line, ran deep into the Italian half, then delivered a cross to Dirk Kuyt. Kuyt then headed down to Wesley Sneijder who slotted the ball past the advancing Gianluigi Buffon. Van Bronckhorst later scored another goal to condemn the then World Cup champions to a 3–0 defeat.

Prior to Euro 2008, captain Edwin van der Sar announced his intention to retire from international football after the tournament; he played his last match as captain in the 3–1 quarter-final loss to Russia. Van Bronckhorst was named Van der Sar's replacement as captain.

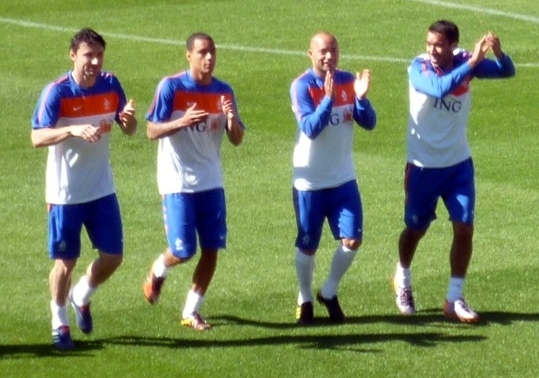
Van Bronckhorst (right) with Mark van Bommel, Gregory van der Wiel and Demy de Zeeuw

=== 2010 World Cup ===
Van Bronckhorst was included in the Netherlands' preliminary squad for the tournament, and on 27 May 2010, Dutch manager Bert van Marwijk announced he would be part of the final squad of 23 and would serve as team captain. In the semi-final against Uruguay, he scored the opening goal of a 3–2 win. The powerful long-range strike – which rose into goalkeeper Fernando Muslera's top left-hand corner – was widely considered one of the best goals in World Cup history. In November 2022, FIFA included this goal in its list of the 22 best goals.

Van Bronckhorst's final match for the Netherlands and as a professional footballer came in the World Cup final against Spain. He was substituted in the 105th minute for Edson Braafheid with the score 0–0, only for Andrés Iniesta to condemn the Dutch to a defeat, scoring the only goal of the match in the 116th minute. After ending the tournament as runners-up, Van Bronckhorst stated he was proud of what the team had achieved.

== Managerial career ==
=== Feyenoord ===
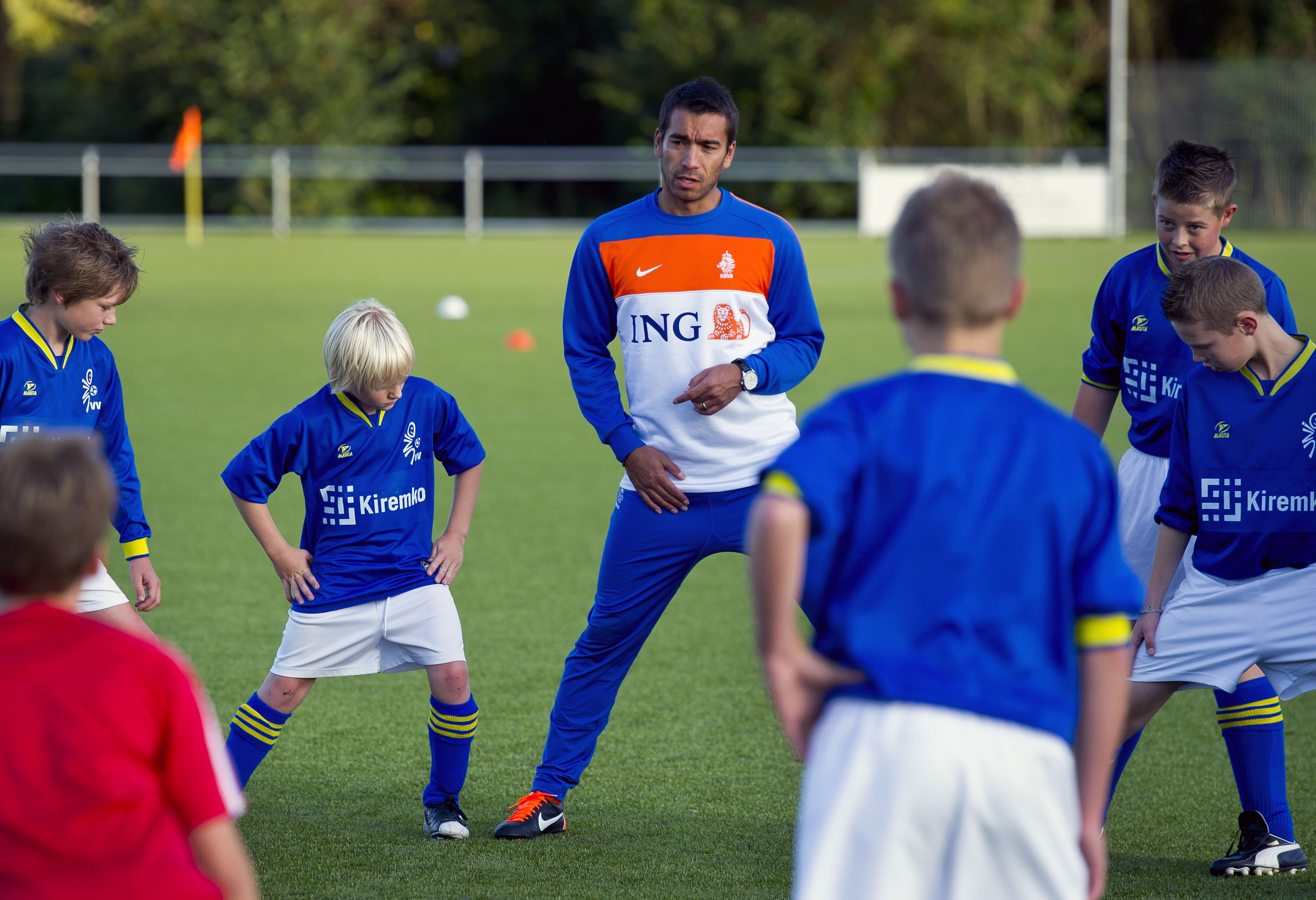
Van Bronckhorst coaching young players in 2011

Having retired at the end of the 2009–10 season prior to the 2010 World Cup, it was announced on 21 July 2011 that Van Bronckhorst would assist newly appointed Feyenoord manager Ronald Koeman, alongside fellow ex-Feyenoord player Jean-Paul van Gastel. Feyenoord finished the season second behind Ajax, thereby qualifying for the 2012–13 UEFA Champions League. On 23 March 2015, it was announced Van Bronckhorst would be the new manager of Feyenoord after Fred Rutten would leave at the end of that season.

On his managerial debut on 8 August 2015, Van Bronckhorst won 3–2 at home to Utrecht, with the winning penalty coming from Dirk Kuyt, who had been brought back after nine years abroad. In his first full season, Van Bronckhorst led Feyenoord to win the 2015–16 KNVB Cup after the club defeated Utrecht 2–1 in the final. In his second season, Van Bronckhorst won the Eredivisie title, Feyenoord's first in 18 years.

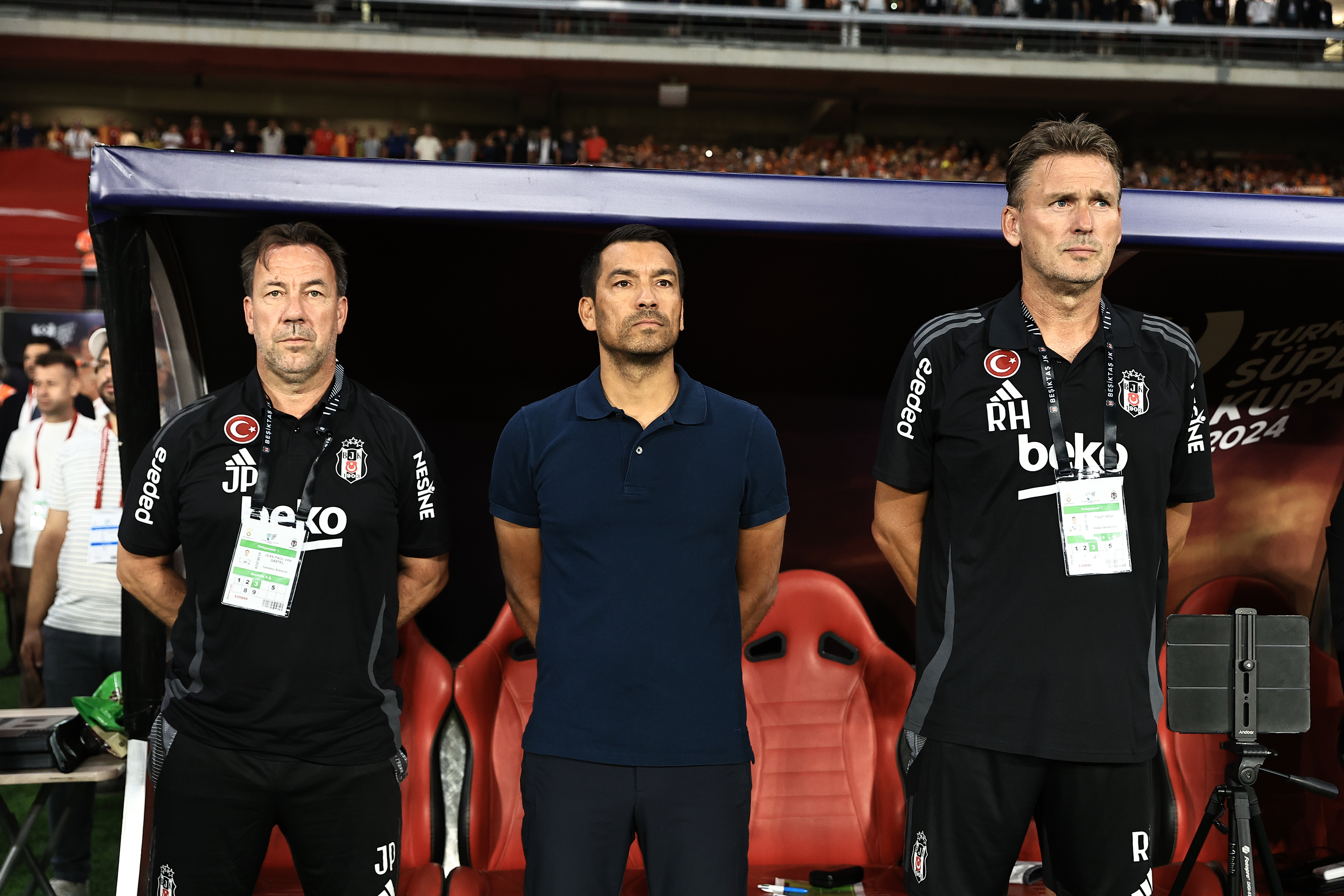
Jean-Paul van Gastel, Giovanni van Bronckhorst and Ruud Hesp in the 2024 Turkish Super Cup

In 2017–18, Feyenoord opened the season by winning the 2017 Johan Cruyff Shield on penalties against Vitesse. On 17 December 2017, the team won 7–0 away at Sparta Rotterdam in the Rotterdam derby. The team again won the KNVB Cup, with a 3–0 final victory over AZ on 22 April 2018; it was the tournament's 100th final.

On 24 January 2019, Van Bronckhorst announced that he would be leaving Feyenoord after the 2018–19 season.

=== Guangzhou R&F ===
On 4 January 2020, Van Bronckhorst signed with Chinese Super League side Guangzhou R&F. He finished 11th in his only season, then quit in December so he could return to his family.

=== Rangers ===
On 18 November 2021, Van Bronckhorst was appointed manager of Rangers, 20 years after leaving as a player. He replaced Steven Gerrard, who had moved to Aston Villa.

On his Rangers managerial debut, he won 2–0 at home to Sparta Prague in the UEFA Europa League group stage; on his Scottish Premiership debut on 28 November, he won 3–1 at Livingston. A run of seven consecutive league wins from his debut ended with a 1–1 draw at Aberdeen on 18 January 2022, and a series of ten unbeaten league games under his management ended on 2 February with a 3–0 loss at Celtic, ceding first place to the rivals. Van Bronckhorst's Rangers did not recover first place in the league, which went to Celtic under their new manager Ange Postecoglou. On the European front, the team made their first continental final since 2008 with knockout victories over Borussia Dortmund, Red Star Belgrade, Braga and RB Leipzig. They lost the 2022 final to Eintracht Frankfurt on penalties. Days later, Rangers won the Scottish Cup final 2–0 against Hearts for their first such trophy since 2009, having earlier beaten Celtic in the semi-finals. Rangers qualified for the 2022–23 UEFA Champions League group stage under van Bronckhorst, but then suffered six consecutive defeats in that tournament and fell nine points behind Celtic in the 2022–23 Scottish Premiership. Van Bronckhorst was sacked by Rangers on 21 November, during the World Cup break.

=== Beşiktaş ===
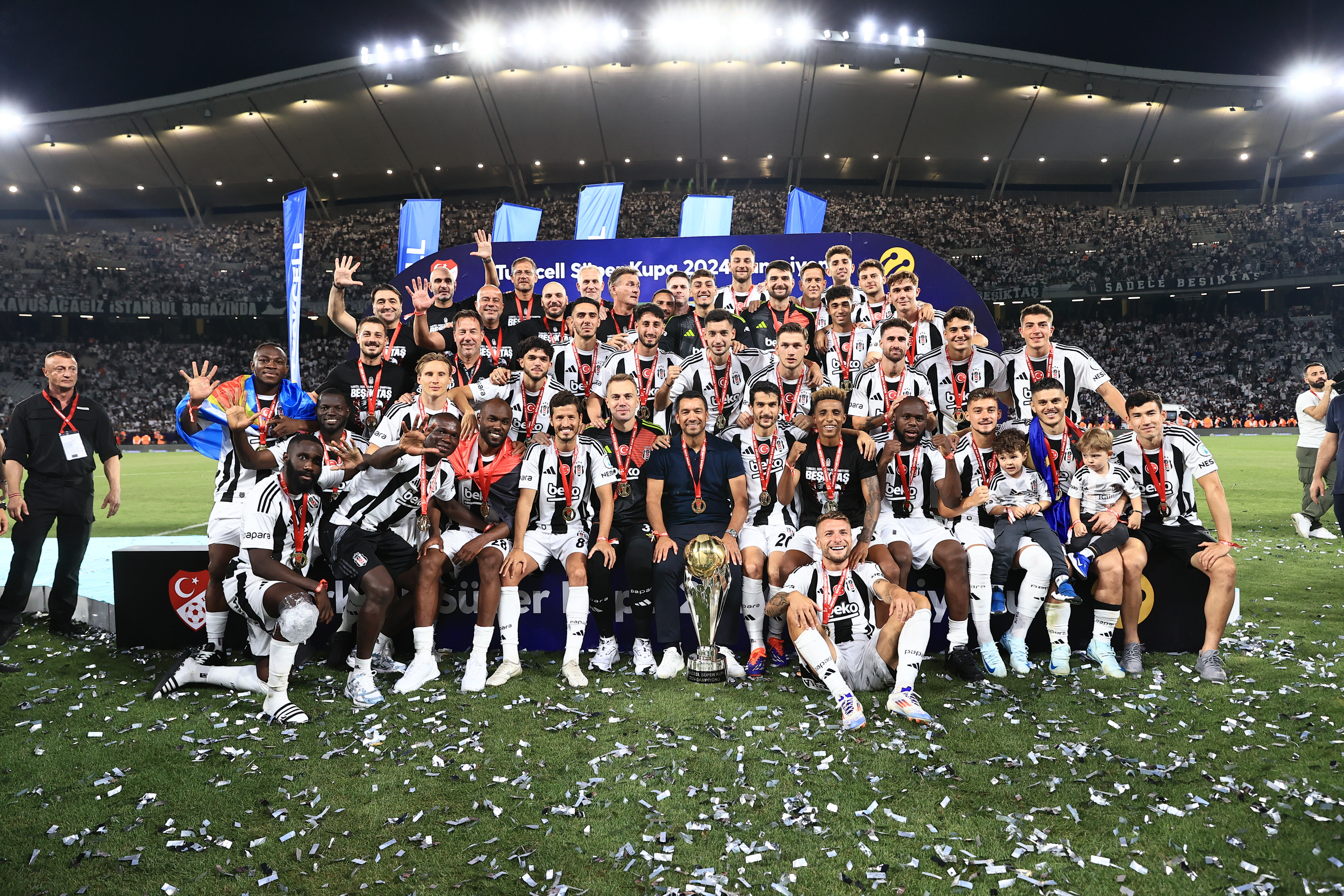
Van Bronckhorst with his technical staff and players, 2024

On 5 June 2024, Van Bronckhorst became the head coach of Turkish side Beşiktaş, by signing a two-year deal with an option for another one-year extension. He won the Turkish Super Cup and led the team to eight matches undefeated in the league. Following the team's defeat by Israeli team Maccabi Tel Aviv in the Europa League he was sacked on 30 November 2024.

=== Liverpool ===
On 2 July 2025, Van Bronckhorst joined reigning Premier League champions Liverpool in the role of assistant coach under Arne Slot. He was sacked two weeks after Slot's departure.

=== Return to Feyenoord ===
On 17 June 2026 it was announced that Van Bronckhorst will return to Feyenoord as head coach for the upcoming season, replacing Robin van Persie. He will be joined by Sipke Hulshoff, who was also an assistant coach at Liverpool.

== Personal life ==
Van Bronckhorst was born in Rotterdam to Victor van Bronckhorst-Manuhutu, an Indonesian-Dutch father, and Fransien Sapulette, an Indonesian mother of Moluccan descent.

Van Bronckhorst and his wife Marieke have two sons. Giovanni and Marieke founded the Giovanni van Bronckhorst Foundation (GvB Foundation) in 2008. Based in Rotterdam, the Foundation aims to enable disadvantaged children transitioning from primary to secondary school to develop basic life skills to overcome personal and social barriers by encouraging participation in sport.

== Career statistics ==
=== Club ===
Appearances and goals by club, season and competition
Club	Season	League			National cup		League cup		Continental		Other		Total	
Club	Season	Division	Apps	Goals	Apps	Goals	Apps	Goals	Apps	Goals	Apps	Goals	Apps	Goals
RKC Waalwijk (loan)	1993–94	Eredivisie	12	2			—		—		—		12	2
Feyenoord	1994–95	Eredivisie	10	1			—		—		—		10	1
Feyenoord	1995–96	Eredivisie	27	9			—		7 (Note: Appearances in UEFA Cup Winners' Cup)	0	1 (Note: Appearance in Dutch Supercup)	0	35	9
Feyenoord	1996–97	Eredivisie	34	4	1	1	—		6 (Note: Appearances in UEFA Cup)	0	—		41	5
Feyenoord	1997–98	Eredivisie	32	8			—		8 (Note: Appearances in UEFA Champions League)	2	—		40	10
Feyenoord	Total		103	22	1	1	—		21	2	1	0	126	25
Rangers	1998–99	Scottish Premier League	35	7	5	1	4	0	9	2	—		53	10
Rangers	1999–2000	Scottish Premier League	27	4	5	2	1	0	12	0	—		45	6
Rangers	2000–01	Scottish Premier League	11	2	0	0	1	1	7	3	—		19	6
Rangers	Total		73	13	10	3	6	1	28	5	—		117	22
Arsenal	2001–02	Premier League	21	1	2	0	3	0	7	0	—		33	1
Arsenal	2002–03	Premier League	20	1	5	0	1	0	4	0	—		30	1
Arsenal	2003–04	Premier League	0	0	0	0	0	0	0	0	1 (Note: Appearance in FA Community Shield)	0	1	0
Arsenal	Total		41	2	7	0	4	0	11	0	1	0	64	2
Barcelona (loan)	2003–04	La Liga	34	1	5	0	—		4	0	—		43	1
Barcelona	2004–05	La Liga	29	4	1	0	—		8	0	—		38	4
Barcelona	2005–06	La Liga	19	0	4	1	—		13	0	—		36	1
Barcelona	2006–07	La Liga	23	0	6	1	—		6	0	3 (Note: One appearance in Supercopa de España, two appearances in FIFA Club World Cup)	0	38	1
Barcelona	Total		105	5	16	2	—		31	0	3	0	155	7
Feyenoord	2007–08	Eredivisie	32	7	6	0	—		—		—		38	7
Feyenoord	2008–09	Eredivisie	27	1	5	0	—		5	1	3 (Note: One appearance in Johan Cruyff Shield, two appearances in Eredivisie European play-offs)	0	40	2
Feyenoord	2009–10	Eredivisie	29	0	4	2	—		—		—		33	2
Feyenoord	Total		88	8	15	2	—		5	1	3	0	111	11
Career total			422	52	49	8	10	1	96	8	8	0	585	69

=== International ===
Appearances and goals by national team and year
National team	Year	Apps	Goals
Netherlands	1996	3	0
Netherlands	1997	4	1
Netherlands	1998	1	0
Netherlands	1999	6	0
Netherlands	2000	7	1
Netherlands	2001	4	0
Netherlands	2002	1	0
Netherlands	2003	6	1
Netherlands	2004	13	0
Netherlands	2005	9	0
Netherlands	2006	9	0
Netherlands	2007	10	1
Netherlands	2008	14	1
Netherlands	2009	9	0
Netherlands	2010	10	1
Total		106	6

Scores and results list the Netherlands' goal tally first, score column indicates score after each van Bronckhorst goal.

List of international goals scored by Giovanni van Bronckhorst
No.	Date	Venue	Opponent	Score	Result	Competition
1	4 June 1997	Johannesburg, South Africa	South Africa	1–0	2–0	Friendly
2	2 September 2000	Amsterdam, Netherlands	Republic of Ireland	2–2	2–2	2002 FIFA World Cup qualification
3	12 February 2003	Amsterdam, Netherlands	Argentina	1–0	1–0	Friendly
4	28 March 2007	Celje, Slovenia	Slovenia	1–0	1–0	UEFA Euro 2008 qualifying
5	9 June 2008	Bern, Switzerland	Italy	3–0	3–0	UEFA Euro 2008
6	6 July 2010	Cape Town, South Africa	Uruguay	1–0	3–2	2010 FIFA World Cup

== Managerial statistics ==
As of match played 21 November 2026

Managerial record by team and tenure
Team	Nat	From	To	Record								Ref
Team	Nat	From	To	G	W	D	L	GF	GA	GD	Win %	Ref
Feyenoord	(Netherlands)	18 May 2015	19 May 2019	176	107	26	43	367	190	+177	60.80	
Guangzhou R&F	(China)	4 January 2020	3 December 2020	23	7	6	10	32	41	−9	30.43	
Rangers	(Scotland)	18 November 2021	21 November 2022	68	42	12	14	131	72	+59	61.76	
Beşiktaş	(Turkey)	5 June 2024	20 November 2024	20	10	4	6	39	29	+10	50.00	
Feyenoord	(Netherlands)	17 June 2026	present	17	8	4	5	42	31	+11	47.06	
Career total				304	174	52	78	611	363	+248	57.24	

== Honours ==
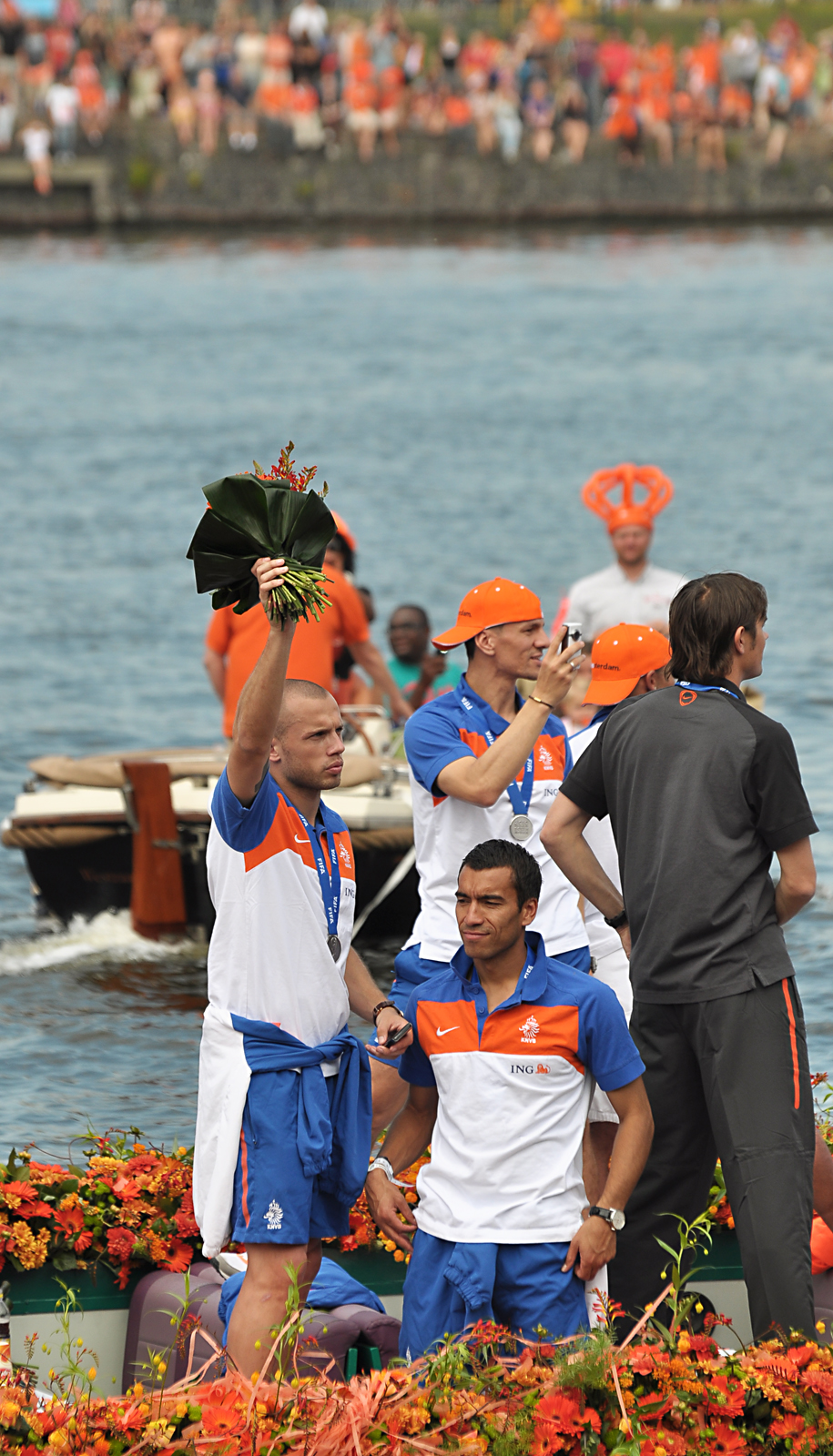
Van Bronckhorst (front) with John Heitinga, Khalid Boulahrouz and Phillip Cocu in 2010.

=== Player ===
Feyenoord

- KNVB Cup: 1994−95, 2007−08

Rangers

- Scottish Premier League: 1998−99, 1999−2000
- Scottish Cup: 1998–99, 1999–2000
- Scottish League Cup: 1998–99

Arsenal

- Premier League: 2001−02
- FA Cup: 2002–03

Barcelona

- La Liga: 2004–05, 2005−06
- Supercopa de España: 2005, 2006
- UEFA Champions League: 2005−06
- FIFA Club World Cup runner-up: 2006

Netherlands

- FIFA World Cup runner-up: 2010

=== Manager ===
Feyenoord

- Eredivisie: 2016–17
- KNVB Cup: 2015–16, 2017–18
- Johan Cruyff Shield: 2017, 2018

Rangers

- Scottish Cup: 2021–22
- UEFA Europa League runner up: 2021–22

Beşiktaş

- Turkish Super Cup: 2024

=== Individual ===
- FIFA Puskás Award 3rd place: 2010

=== Orders ===
- Knight of the Order of Orange-Nassau: 2010

== See also ==
- List of footballers with 100 or more caps
