= Fredson (footballer, born 1981) =

Brazilian footballer

Personal information
- Full name: Fredson Câmara Pereira
- Date of birth: 22 February 1981 (age 45)
- Place of birth: Monção, Maranhão, Brazil
- Height: 1.80 m (5 ft 11 in)
- Position: Midfielder

Youth career
- Paraná

Senior career*
Years	Team	Apps	(Gls)
1998–2002	Paraná		
2002–2008	Espanyol	98	(10)
2007	→ São Paulo (loan)	1	(0)
2008–2009	Goiás	6	(0)
2010	Avaí	0	(0)
2011	Ceilândia	5	(0)
2012	Cuiabá	12	(0)
2012	Iporá		
2013	Vila Nova		
2014	Ceilândia		
- * Club domestic league appearances and goals

Fredson Câmara Pereira (born 22 February 1981), known simply as Fredson, is a Brazilian retired footballer who played as a midfielder.

== Football career ==
Born in Monção, Maranhão, Fredson started his professional career with Paraná Clube in 1998, moving four years later to Spain after having signed with RCD Espanyol. At the Catalonia club he was never an undisputed starter, but received a significant amount of playing time, helping it to the Copa del Rey in his fourth season.

In January 2007, after having appeared in 117 official games for Espanyol over the course of four 1/2 La Liga seasons, Fredson moved on loan to São Paulo FC, where he sustained a severe knee injury. Upon his return he was deemed surplus to requirements by new boss Tintín Márquez, being sold in the 2008 summer to another Brazilian side, Goiás Esporte Clube.

For the 2010 campaign, Fredson joined modest Série A team Avaí Futebol Clube.

== Honours ==
Paraná

- Campeonato Brasileiro Série B: 2000

Espanyol

- Copa del Rey: 2005–06

São Paulo

- Campeonato Brasileiro Série A: 2007
