= Monção, Maranhão =

Coordinates: 3°29′31″S 45°15′03″W

- Municipality
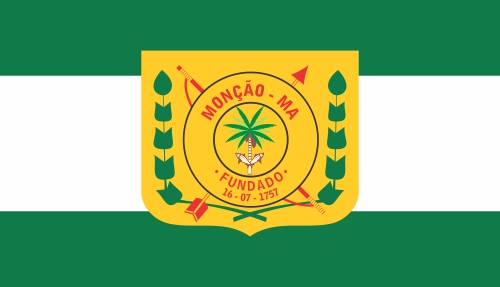
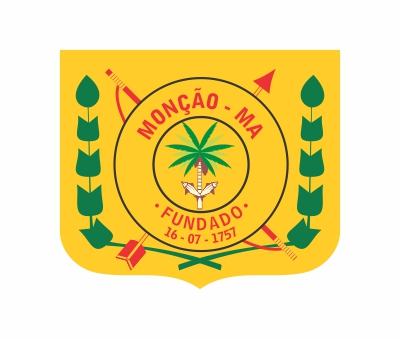
- Flag Coat of arms

- Location in Maranhão
- Country: Brazil
- Region: Nordeste
- State: Maranhão
- Mesoregion: Norte Maranhense
- Elevation: 46 ft (14 m)

Population (2020)
  - Total: 33,664
- Time zone: UTC−3 (BRT)

Monção, Maranhão is a municipality in the state of Maranhão in the Northeast region of Brazil.

The municipality contains a small part of the Baixada Maranhense Environmental Protection Area, a 1,775,035.6-hectare (4,386,208-acre) sustainable use conservation unit created in 1991 that has been a Ramsar Site since 2000.

== See also ==
- List of municipalities in Maranhão
