= 2006 FIFA Club World Cup =

FIFA Club World Cup Japan 2006 presented by Toyota Toyota プレゼンツFIFAクラブワールドカップ ジャパン2006
- FIFA Club World Cup 2006 official logo

Tournament details
- Host country: Japan
- Dates: 10–17 December
- Teams: 6 (from 6 confederations)
- Venues: 3 (in 3 host cities)

Final positions
- Champions: (Brazil) Internacional (1st title)
- Runners-up: (Spain) Barcelona
- Third place: (Egypt) Al Ahly
- Fourth place: (Mexico) América

Tournament statistics
- Matches played: 7
- Goals scored: 17 (2.43 per match)
- Attendance: 325,152 (46,450 per match)
- Top scorer(s): Mohamed Aboutrika (Al Ahly); 3 goals
- Best player: Deco (Barcelona)
- Fair play award: (Spain) Barcelona

The 2006 FIFA Club World Cup (officially known as the FIFA Club World Cup Japan 2006 presented by Toyota for sponsorship reasons) was a football tournament held in Japan between 10 and 17 December 2006. It was the third FIFA Club World Cup.

The club champions from each of the six confederations played in a knockout tournament. The quarter-final match-ups were determined by a draw including the AFC, CAF, CONCACAF and OFC champions, while the UEFA and CONMEBOL champions were given byes to the semi-finals. The losers of the quarter-finals played for fifth place, while the losers of the semi-finals played in a third-place play-off.

Defending champions São Paulo were beaten in the 2006 Copa Libertadores Finals by fellow Brazilian side Internacional, who went on to win the Club World Cup for the first time, beating Al Ahly in the semi-finals before defeating Spanish club Barcelona 1–0 in the final.

A team from the host nation did not participate, as was initially proposed. Following the departure of Australia from the OFC, the Oceanian representative, Auckland City, was fully amateur, so forcing them to play a play-off for a place in the quarter-finals against the J. League champions (Gamba Osaka) was considered, which would have also promoted local interest. The change would have also eliminated the fifth-place play-off, to keep the number of games intact. This was finally rejected, but the tournament format was changed for 2007.

== Qualified teams ==
It was all six clubs' first appearance in the FIFA Club World Championship.

Location of teams of the 2006 FIFA Club World Cup

Al Ahly became the first team with more than one appearance in the FIFA Club World Cup.

Team	Confederation	Qualification	Participation
Entering in the semi-finals
(Spain) Barcelona	UEFA	2005–06 UEFA Champions League winners	Debut
(Brazil) Internacional	CONMEBOL	2006 Copa Libertadores winners	Debut
Entering in the quarter-finals
(Egypt) Al Ahly	CAF	2006 CAF Champions League winners	2nd (Previous: 2005)
(South Korea) Jeonbuk Hyundai Motors	AFC	2006 AFC Champions League winners	Debut
(Mexico) América	CONCACAF	2006 CONCACAF Champions' Cup winners	Debut
(New Zealand) Auckland City	OFC	2006 OFC Club Championship winners	Debut

== Venues ==
Tokyo, Yokohama and Toyota were the three cities to serve as venues for the 2006 FIFA Club World Cup.

Yokohama	Tokyo	Toyota
International Stadium Yokohama	National Stadium	Toyota Stadium
35°30′36.16″N 139°36′22.49″E	35°40′41.00″N 139°42′53.00″E	35°05′04.02″N 137°10′14.02″E
Capacity: 72,327	Capacity: 57,363	Capacity: 45,000
2006 FIFA Club World Cup (Japan)

== Match officials ==
Confederation	Referee	Assistant referees
AFC	(Saudi Arabia) Khalil Al Ghamdi (Malaysia) Subkhiddin Mohd Salleh	(United Arab Emirates) Eisa Ghuloum (Syria) Hamdi Al Kadrie
CAF	(South Africa) Jerome Damon	(South Africa) Enock Molefe (Rwanda) Celestin Ntagungira
CONCACAF	(Guatemala) Carlos Batres	(Honduras) Carlos Pastrana (Costa Rica) Leonel Leal
CONMEBOL	(Colombia) Óscar Ruiz	(Colombia) Wilson Berrio (Venezuela) Rafael Yáñez

== Squads ==
For a list of all the rosters of this tournament, see the article 2006 FIFA Club World Cup squads.

== Matches ==
Quarter-finals
10 December – Toyota
(New Zealand) Auckland City	0
(Egypt) Al Ahly	2
11 December – Tokyo
(South Korea) Jeonbuk Hyundai Motors	0
(Mexico) América	1

Semi-finals
13 December – Tokyo
(Egypt) Al Ahly	1
(Brazil) Internacional	2
14 December – Yokohama
(Mexico) América	0
(Spain) Barcelona	4
Match for fifth place
15 December – Tokyo
(New Zealand) Auckland City	0
(South Korea) Jeonbuk Hyundai Motors	3

Final
17 December – Yokohama
(Brazil) Internacional	1
(Spain) Barcelona	0
Match for third place
17 December – Yokohama
(Egypt) Al Ahly	2
(Mexico) América	1

All times Japan Standard Time (UTC+09:00)

=== Quarter-finals ===
10 December 2006
19:20

Auckland City (New Zealand)	0–2	(Egypt) Al Ahly
	Report	Flávio 51'; Aboutrika 73'

Toyota Stadium, Toyota
Attendance: 29,922
Referee: Khalil Al Ghamdi (Saudi Arabia)

11 December 2006
19:20

Jeonbuk Hyundai Motors (South Korea)	0–1	(Mexico) América
	Report	Rojas 79'

Olympic Stadium, Tokyo
Attendance: 34,197
Referee: Jerome Damon (South Africa)

=== Semi-finals ===
13 December 2006
19:20

Al Ahly (Egypt)	1–2	(Brazil) Internacional
Flávio 54'	Report	Pato 23'; Luiz Adriano 72'

Olympic Stadium, Tokyo
Attendance: 33,690
Referee: Subkhiddin Mohd Salleh (Malaysia)

14 December 2006
19:20

América (Mexico)	0–4	(Spain) Barcelona
	Report	Guðjohnsen 11'; Márquez 30'; Ronaldinho 65'; Deco 85'

International Stadium Yokohama, Yokohama
Attendance: 62,316
Referee: Óscar Ruiz (Colombia)

=== Match for fifth place ===
15 December 2006
19:20

Auckland City (New Zealand)	0–3	(South Korea) Jeonbuk Hyundai Motors
	Report	Lee Hyun-Seung 17'; Kim Hyeung-Bum 31'; Zé Carlos 73' (pen.)

Olympic Stadium, Tokyo
Attendance: 23,258
Referee: Khalil Al Ghamdi (Saudi Arabia)

=== Match for third place ===
17 December 2006
16:20

Al Ahly (Egypt)	2–1	(Mexico) América
Aboutrika 42', 79'	Report	Cabañas 59'

International Stadium Yokohama, Yokohama
Attendance: 51,641
Referee: Jerome Damon (South Africa)

=== Final ===
17 December 2006
19:20

Internacional (Brazil)	1–0	(Spain) Barcelona
Adriano Gabiru 82'	Report

International Stadium Yokohama, Yokohama
Attendance: 67,128
Referee: Carlos Batres (Guatemala)

== Goalscorers ==
Rank	Player	Team	Goals
1	(Egypt) Mohamed Aboutrika	(Egypt) Al Ahly	3
2	(Angola) Flávio	(Egypt) Al Ahly	2
3	(Portugal) Deco	(Spain) Barcelona	1
3	(Iceland) Eiður Guðjohnsen	(Spain) Barcelona	1
3	(Mexico) Rafael Márquez	(Spain) Barcelona	1
3	(Brazil) Ronaldinho	(Spain) Barcelona	1
3	(Paraguay) Salvador Cabañas	(Mexico) América	1
3	(Chile) Ricardo Francisco Rojas	(Mexico) América	1
3	(Brazil) Luiz Adriano	(Brazil) Internacional	1
3	(Brazil) Adriano Gabiru	(Brazil) Internacional	1
3	(Brazil) Alexandre Pato	(Brazil) Internacional	1
3	(South Korea) Kim Hyeung-Bum	(South Korea) Jeonbuk Hyundai Motors	1
3	(Brazil) Zé Carlos	(South Korea) Jeonbuk Hyundai Motors	1
3	(South Korea) Lee Hyun-Seung	(South Korea) Jeonbuk Hyundai Motors	1

== Awards ==
Adidas Golden Ball Toyota Award	Adidas Silver Ball	Adidas Bronze Ball
(Portugal) Deco (Barcelona)	(Brazil) Iarley (Internacional)	(Brazil) Ronaldinho (Barcelona)
FIFA Fair Play Award
(Spain) Barcelona
