= 2006 FIFA Club World Cup final =

- Event: 2006 FIFA Club World Cup
| Internacional | Barcelona |
| (Brazil) | (Spain) |
| 1 | 0 |
- Date: 17 December 2006
- Venue: International Stadium Yokohama, Yokohama
- Referee: Carlos Batres (Guatemala)
- Attendance: 67,128

The 2006 FIFA Club World Cup final took place at the International Stadium Yokohama, Japan on 17 December 2006.

The match pitted Internacional of Brazil, the CONMEBOL club champions, against Barcelona of Spain, the UEFA club champions. Internacional won 1–0, after a counter-attack led by Iarley and the goal scored by Adriano Gabiru at the 82nd minute, in a match watched by 67,128 people. In doing so, Internacional won their first FIFA Club World Cup/Intercontinental Cup and Barcelona remained without any world club title. Deco was named as man of the match.

== Road to final ==
| (Brazil) Internacional | Team | (Spain) Barcelona |
|---|---|---|
| CONMEBOL | Confederation | UEFA |
| Winner of the 2006 Copa Libertadores | Qualification | Winner of the 2005–06 UEFA Champions League |
| Bye | Play-off round | Bye |
| Bye | Quarter-finals | Bye |
| 2–1 (Egypt) Al-Ahly (Pato 23', Luiz Adriano 72') | Semi-finals | 4–0 (Mexico) Club América (Guðjohnsen 11', Márquez 30', Ronaldinho 65', Deco 85') |

== Match details ==
=== Details ===
17 December 2006
19:20 UTC+9

| Internacional (Brazil) | 1–0 | (Spain) Barcelona |
|---|---|---|
| Adriano Gabiru 82' | Report |

International Stadium Yokohama, Yokohama
Attendance: 67,128
Referee: Carlos Batres (Guatemala)

| Internacional | Barcelona |

| GK | 1 | (Brazil) Clemer |
| RB | 2 | (Brazil) Ceará |
| CB | 3 | (Brazil) Índio | (yellow card) 45' |
| CB | 4 | (Brazil) Fabiano Eller |
| LB | 15 | (Brazil) Rubens Cardoso |
| CM | 8 | (Brazil) Edinho |
| CM | 5 | (Brazil) Wellington Monteiro |
| RW | 10 | (Brazil) Iarley | (yellow card) 90+3' |
| AM | 7 | (Brazil) Alex | | (substituted off) 46' |
| LW | 11 | (Brazil) Alexandre Pato | | (substituted off) 61' |
| CF | 9 | (Brazil) Fernandão (c) | | (substituted off) 76' |
Substitutes:
| MF | 17 | (Colombia) Fabián Vargas | | (substituted on) 46' |
| FW | 18 | (Brazil) Luiz Adriano | | (substituted on) 61' |
| MF | 16 | (Brazil) Adriano Gabiru | (yellow card) 84' | (substituted on) 76' |
Manager:
(Brazil) Abel Braga

| GK | 1 | (Spain) Víctor Valdés |
| RB | 11 | (Italy) Gianluca Zambrotta | | (substituted off) 46' |
| CB | 5 | (Spain) Carles Puyol (c) |
| CB | 4 | (Mexico) Rafael Márquez |
| LB | 12 | (Netherlands) Giovanni van Bronckhorst |
| CM | 3 | (Brazil) Thiago Motta | (yellow card) 55' | (substituted off) 59' |
| CM | 24 | (Spain) Andrés Iniesta |
| RW | 8 | (France) Ludovic Giuly |
| AM | 20 | (Portugal) Deco |
| LW | 10 | (Brazil) Ronaldinho |
| CF | 7 | (Iceland) Eiður Guðjohnsen | | (substituted off) 88' |
Substitutes:
| DF | 2 | (Brazil) Juliano Belletti | | (substituted on) 46' |
| MF | 6 | (Spain) Xavi | | (substituted on) 59' |
| FW | 18 | (Spain) Santiago Ezquerro | | (substituted on) 88' |
Manager:
(Netherlands) Frank Rijkaard

Assistant referees:
Carlos Pastrana (Honduras)
Leonel Leal (Costa Rica)
Fourth official:
Subkhiddin Mohd Salleh (Malaysia)

Match rules

- 90 minutes.
- 30 minutes of extra time if necessary.
- Penalty shoot-out if scores still level.
- Twelve named substitutes.
- Maximum of three substitutions.

=== Statistics ===
Overall
| | Internacional | Barcelona |
|---|---|---|
| Goals scored | 1 | 0 |
| Total shots | 10 | 17 |
| Shots on target | 2 | 6 |
| Ball possession | 43% | 57% |
| Corner kicks | 2 | 11 |
| Fouls committed | 25 | 15 |
| Offsides | 5 | 1 |
| Yellow cards | 3 | 1 |
| Red cards | 0 | 0 |
