= Adriano Gabiru =

Brazilian footballer (born 1977)

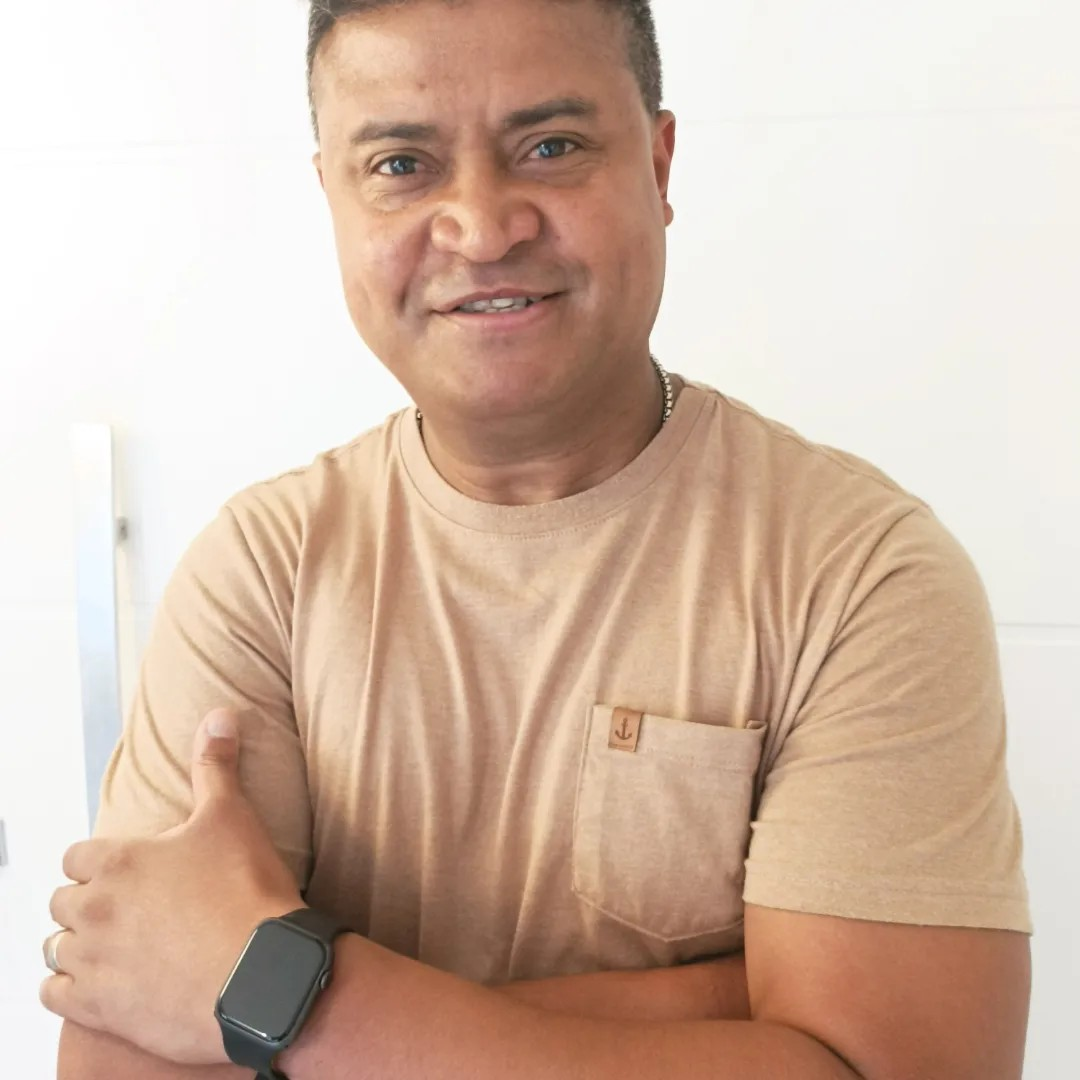

Personal information
- Full name: Carlos Adriano de Souza Vieira
- Date of birth: 11 August 1977 (age 49)
- Place of birth: Maceió, Brazil
- Height: 1.72 m (5 ft 7 1/2 in)
- Position: Attacking midfielder

Team information
- Current team: Guarany

Youth career
- 1995–1996: CSA

Senior career*
Years	Team	Apps	(Gls)
1997	CSA	0	(0)
1998–2006	Atlético-PR	116	(19)
2000–2001	→ Marseille (loan)	14	(3)
2004–2005	→ Cruzeiro (loan)	47	(12)
2006	Internacional	24	(3)
2007	→ Figueirense (loan)	5	(0)
2007	→ Sport (loan)	15	(2)
2008	→ Goiás (loan)	14	(0)
2008–2009	Inter Baku	10	(1)
2009	Guarani	9	(0)
2009	Sport	1	(0)
2010	Mixto		
2011	Corinthians Paranaense		
2012	CSA		
2012	Guarany		

International career
1999–2000	Brazil U-23	9	(3)
2003	Brazil	1	(0)
- * Club domestic league appearances and goals

Carlos Adriano de Souza Vieira or simply Adriano Gabiru (born 11 August 1977 in Maceió), is a retired Brazilian attacking midfielder.

He was member of the Brazil national team in qualifying at the 2000 Summer Olympics and 2003 FIFA Confederations Cup.

In December 2006 he scored the game-winning and only goal in a 1–0 victory for Internacional against Spanish side FC Barcelona for the FIFA Club World Cup crown in Japan.

== Honours ==
=== Club ===
Atlético-PR

- Campeonato Alagoano: 1998
- Campeonato Paranaense: 1998, 2000, 2001, 2002
- Campeonato Brasileiro Série A: 2001

Internacional

- Copa Libertadores da América: 2006
- FIFA Club World Cup: 2006
