= 1998 Campeonato Gaúcho =

Campeonato Gaúcho
- Season: 1998
- Champions: Juventude
- Relegated: Farroupilha; Guarany de Garibaldi
- Copa do Brasil: Grêmio; Internacional; Juventude; Caxias
- Série C: Brasil de Pelotas; Caxias; Pelotas; São José
- Copa Sul: Internacional; Grêmio; Juventude; Caxias
- Matches played: 189
- Goals scored: 481 (2.54 per match)
- Top goalscorer: Badico (Internacional-SM) – 18 goals
- Biggest home win: Grêmio 6-0 Internacional-SM (April 18, 1998)
- Biggest away win: Farroupilha 3-6 Internacional-SM (March 1, 1998); Novo Hamburgo 2-5 Grêmio Santanense (April 5, 1998); Lajeadense 2-5 Veranópolis (April 12, 1998); Grêmio Santanense 0-3 Internacional (April 16, 1998)
- Highest scoring: Farroupilha 3-6 Internacional-SM (March 1, 1998)
- Longest unbeaten run: Juventude – 12 matches

The 78th season of the Campeonato Gaúcho kicked off on February 1, 1998 and ended on June 7, 1998. Twenty-eight teams participated. Juventude beat Internacional in the finals and won their 1st title, being the first team from outside Porto Alegre to win the title since 1939. That championship also marked the first time since 1954 that neither Grêmio or Internacional won the title. Farroupilha and Guarany de Garibaldi were relegated.

== Participating teams ==
Club	Home location	Previous season
15 de Novembro	Campo Bom	21st
Brasil	Pelotas	4th
Brasil	Farroupilha	9th
Caxias	Caxias do Sul	8th
Esportivo	Bento Gonçalves	16th
Farroupilha	Pelotas	22nd
Glória	Vacaria	11th
Grêmio	Porto Alegre	2nd
Grêmio	Santana do Livramento	15th
Guarani	Venâncio Aires	5th
Guarany	Garibaldi	26th
Internacional	Porto Alegre	1st
Internacional	Santa Maria	17th
Juventude	Caxias do Sul	6th
Lajeadense	Lajeado	2nd (Second level)
Novo Hamburgo	Novo Hamburgo	24th
Palmeirense	Palmeira das Missões	23rd
Passo Fundo	Passo Fundo	20th
Pelotas	Pelotas	7th
São José	Cachoeira do Sul	1st (Second level)
São José	Porto Alegre	25th
São Luiz	Ijuí	13th
São Paulo	Rio Grande	19th
Santa Cruz	Santa Cruz do Sul	10th
Santo Ângelo	Santo Ângelo	14th
Taquariense	Taquari	18th
Veranópolis	Veranópolis	3rd
Ypiranga	Erechim	12th

== System ==
The championship would have four stages:

- Division A: Comprised fourteen teams. Grêmio, Internacional and Juventude earned a bye directly to the Second phase. The remaining eleven teams played each other in a single round-robin system. The six best teams qualified to the Second phase, while the bottom two teams would have to dispute the Copa Abílio dos Reis in the Second semester. São Luiz, Inter de Santa Maria, Brasil de Pelotas and Glória, due to their performance in the 1997 Copa Galego, were automatically qualified regardless of placing.
- Division B: The twelve teams that had qualified to Division B in the previous year joined the two teams that had been promoted from the Second level, and were divided into two groups of seven, in which each team played the teams of its own group in a double round-robin system. the best two teams in each group, plus the best third-placed team qualified to the Second phase, while the bottom-placed team in each group was relegated to the Second level. The teams that finished from the second to sixth place could participate in the Copa Abílio dos Reis.
- Second phase: The sixteen remaining teams were divided into four groups of four, in which each team played the teams of its own group in a double round-robin system. The two best teams in each group qualified to the Quarterfinals.
- Final rounds: The remaining eight teams played a series of two-legged knockout ties to define the champions.

== Championship ==
=== Division A ===
Pos	Team	Pld	W	D	L	GF	GA	GD	Pts	Qualification or relegation
1	São Luiz	10	5	1	4	15	12	+3	16	Qualified
2	Veranópolis	10	5	1	4	13	12	+1	16	Qualified
3	Ypiranga de Erechim	10	5	0	5	9	8	+1	15	Qualified
4	Brasil de Farroupilha	10	4	3	3	10	9	+1	15	Qualified
5	Santo Ângelo	10	4	3	3	9	9	0	15	Qualified
6	Santa Cruz	10	4	2	4	18	14	+4	14	Qualified
7	Pelotas	10	4	2	4	14	13	+1	14	
8	Caxias	10	3	5	2	10	9	+1	14	
9	Guarani de Venâncio Aires	10	3	5	2	11	12	−1	14	
10	Glória	10	3	3	4	14	18	−4	12	Qualified;Copa Abílio dos Reis
11	Brasil de Pelotas	10	1	3	6	6	13	−7	6	Qualified;Copa Abílio dos Reis

Updated to match(es) played on April 5, 1998. Source: RSSSF.com
Rules for classification: 1) points; 2) wins; 3) goal difference; 4) number of goals scored.

=== Division B ===
==== Group 1 ====
Pos	Team	Pld	W	D	L	GF	GA	GD	Pts	Qualification or relegation
1	Esportivo	10	6	3	1	14	5	+9	21	Qualified
2	Lajeadense	10	5	3	2	15	8	+7	18	Qualified
3	15 de Novembro	10	4	4	2	14	10	+4	16	
4	Passo Fundo	10	4	3	3	11	10	+1	15	
5	Palmeirense	10	1	3	6	14	21	−7	6	
6	Taquariense	10	0	4	6	8	22	−14	4	
7	Guarany de Garibaldi	0	0	0	0	0	0	0	0	Withdrew

Updated to match(es) played on April 5, 1998. Source: RSSSF.com
Rules for classification: 1) points; 2) wins; 3) goal difference; 4) number of goals scored.

==== Group 2 ====
Pos	Team	Pld	W	D	L	GF	GA	GD	Pts	Qualification or relegation
1	Internacional de Santa Maria	12	7	3	2	29	16	+13	24	Repechage
2	São José de Porto Alegre	12	6	4	2	22	13	+9	22	Repechage
3	Grêmio Santanense	12	7	0	5	14	13	+1	21	Repechage
4	São Paulo	12	4	6	2	13	8	+5	18	
5	Novo Hamburgo	12	5	1	6	17	23	−6	16	
6	São José de Cachoeira do Sul	12	1	7	4	12	15	−3	10	
7	Farroupilha	12	0	3	9	9	28	−19	3	Relegated

Updated to match(es) played on April 5, 1998. Source: RSSSF.com
Rules for classification: 1) points; 2) wins; 3) goal difference; 4) number of goals scored.

=== Second phase ===
==== Group 1 ====
Pos	Team	Pld	W	D	L	GF	GA	GD	Pts	Qualification or relegation
1	Internacional	6	5	1	0	16	4	+12	16	Qualified
2	Glória	6	2	3	1	10	9	+1	9	Qualified
3	Santo Ângelo	6	1	2	3	8	10	−2	5	
4	Grêmio Santanense	6	1	0	5	2	13	−11	3	

Updated to match(es) played on May 3, 1998. Source: RSSSF.com
Rules for classification: 1) points; 2) wins; 3) goal difference; 4) number of goals scored.

==== Group 2 ====
Pos	Team	Pld	W	D	L	GF	GA	GD	Pts	Qualification or relegation
1	Grêmio	18	18	0	0	14	3	+11	54	Qualified
2	Santa Cruz	6	3	1	2	15	12	+3	10	Qualified
3	Esportivo	6	2	1	3	11	11	0	7	
4	Internacional de Santa Maria	6	1	1	4	7	21	−14	4	

Updated to match(es) played on May 3, 1998. Source: RSSSF.com
Rules for classification: 1) points; 2) wins; 3) goal difference; 4) number of goals scored.

==== Group 3 ====
Pos	Team	Pld	W	D	L	GF	GA	GD	Pts	Qualification or relegation
1	Juventude	6	3	3	0	6	2	+4	12	Qualified
2	Brasil de Pelotas	6	2	2	2	5	4	+1	8	Qualified
3	São José de Porto Alegre	6	2	2	2	4	5	−1	8	
4	Brasil de Farroupilha	6	0	3	3	2	6	−4	3	

Updated to match(es) played on May 3, 1998. Source: RSSSF.com
Rules for classification: 1) points; 2) wins; 3) goal difference; 4) number of goals scored.

==== Group 4 ====
Pos	Team	Pld	W	D	L	GF	GA	GD	Pts	Qualification or relegation
1	Veranópolis	6	4	1	1	13	7	+6	13	Qualified
2	São Luiz	6	3	1	2	10	10	0	10	Qualified
3	Ypiranga	6	1	2	3	9	10	−1	5	
4	Lajeadense	6	1	2	3	11	16	−5	5	

Updated to match(es) played on May 3, 1998. Source: RSSSF.com
Rules for classification: 1) points; 2) wins; 3) goal difference; 4) number of goals scored.

=== Quarterfinals ===
Team 1	Agg.	Team 2	1st leg	2nd leg
Brasil de Pelotas	2–1	Grêmio	0–0	2–1
Santa Cruz	1–3	Veranópolis	0–0	1–3
São Luiz	0–2	Internacional	0–1	0–1
Glória	0–3	Juventude	0–1	0–2

=== Semifinals ===
Team 1	Agg.	Team 2	1st leg	2nd leg
Veranópolis	0–4	Internacional	0–0	0–4
Brasil de Pelotas	1–2	Juventude	0–0	1–2

=== Finals ===
Team 1	Agg.	Team 2	1st leg	2nd leg
Juventude	3–1	Internacional	3–1	0–0

31 May 1998
Finals

Juventude	3 –1	Internacional
Flávio 17', 57'; Lauro 67'	Report	Christian 5'

Alfredo Jaconi, Caxias do Sul
Referee: Alexandre Lourenço Barreto
7 June 1998
Finals

Internacional	0 – 0	Juventude
	Report

Beira-Rio, Porto Alegre
Referee: Carlos Eugênio Simon

== State Cups ==
For the second semester, Two tournaments were held; the Copa Ênio Andrade, disputed by five teams from Division A, and the Copa Abílio dos Reis, disputed by seven teams from Division B and the bottom two from Division A.

In the Copa Ênio Andrade, all teams played each other in a double round-robin system, with the two best teams earning an automatic qualification, and an extra point, to the Second phase of the 1999 championship. The winner also won a berth in the 1999 Copa Sul.

In the Copa Abílio dos Reis, all teams played each other in a double round-robin system, with the four best teams qualifying for the Division A of the 1999 championship.

=== Copa Ênio Andrade ===
Pos	Team	Pld	W	D	L	GF	GA	GD	Pts	Qualification or relegation
1	Caxias	8	4	2	2	11	8	+3	14	Champions and Qualified to 1999 Copa Sul
2	Santo Ângelo	8	3	2	3	11	8	+3	11	Playoffs
3	Pelotas	8	2	5	1	7	8	−1	11	Playoffs
4	Ypiranga de Erechim	8	2	3	3	6	8	−2	9	
5	São Luiz	8	2	2	4	6	9	−3	8	

Updated to match(es) played on November 8, 1998. Source: RSSSF.com
Rules for classification: 1) points; 2) wins; 3) goal difference; 4) number of goals scored.

==== Playoffs ====
Team 1	Score	Team 2
Santo Ângelo	3–0	Pelotas

=== Copa Abílio dos Reis ===
Pos	Team	Pld	W	D	L	GF	GA	GD	Pts	Qualification or relegation
1	Lajeadense	16	9	2	5	21	15	+6	29	Champions and Qualified to 1999 Division A
2	15 de Novembro	16	8	2	6	23	16	+7	26	Qualified to 1999 Division A
3	Brasil de Pelotas	16	7	4	5	26	23	+3	25	Qualified to 1999 Division A
4	São José de Cachoeira do Sul	16	7	2	7	21	17	+4	23	Playoffs
5	Passo Fundo	16	5	8	3	19	19	0	23	Playoffs
6	São Paulo	16	6	4	6	9	12	−3	22	
7	São José de Porto Alegre	16	3	9	4	14	14	0	18	
8	Novo Hamburgo	16	4	4	8	16	26	−10	16	
9	Glória	16	3	5	8	14	21	−7	14	

Updated to match(es) played on November 29, 1998. Source: RSSSF.com
Rules for classification: 1) points; 2) wins; 3) goal difference; 4) number of goals scored.

==== Playoffs ====
Team 1	Score	Team 2
São José de Cachoeira do Sul	1–1 (5-6 pen.)	Passo Fundo
