= 2008 Sport Club Internacional season =

Sport Club Internacional
2008 season
- Chairman: Vitório Piffero
- Manager: Abel Braga
- Campeonato Brasileiro: 7th
- Campeonato Gaúcho: Winners
- Copa do Brasil: Quarter-final
- Top goalscorer: League: Campeonato Brasileiro; Nilmar (14); Copa do Brasil; Alex (3); Campeonato Gaúcho; Alex (13); All: Alex (31)

The 2008 season is the 99th season in Sport Club Internacional's existence, and their 38th in the Campeonato Brasileiro, having never been relegated from the top division.

== Club ==
=== The Management ===
Position	Staff
Technical manager	(Brazil) Giovanni Luigi
Manager	(Brazil) Tite
Assistant coach	(Brazil) Cléber Xavier
Assistant coach	(Brazil) Guto Ferreira
Fitness coach	(Brazil) Fabio Mahseredjian
Assistant fitness coach	(Brazil) Flávio Soares
Goalkeeping coach	(Brazil) Ilo Roxo

Last updated: 9 July 2008

=== Team kit ===
The team kit for the season was produced by Reebok and the shirt sponsor is Banrisul.

Home	Away	training kit

== Squad ==
=== Most frequent start ===
As of 22 July

Country	P	Name	GS	Notes
(Brazil)	GK	Renan	25	
(Brazil)	CB	Índio	30	
(Colombia)	CB	Orozco	27	
(Brazil)	CB	Marcão	35	
(Colombia)	RW	Bustos	18	
(Brazil)	MF	Magrão	28	
(Brazil)	MF	Edinho	23	
(Argentina)	MF	Guiñazú	30	
(Brazil)	MF	Alex	32	
(Brazil)	FW	Nilmar	24	
(Brazil)	FW	Iarley	24	

== Transfers ==
=== Transfers in ===
—	MF	BRA	Andrezinho (From (South Korea) Pohang Steelers)
—	DF	BRA	Ângelo (From (Brazil) Paraná)
—	DF	BRA	Bolívar (On loan from (France) AS Monaco)
—	DF	COL	Bustos (From (Brazil) Grêmio)
—	MF	ARG	D'Alessandro (From (Argentina) San Lorenzo)
—	MF	BRA	Daniel Carvalho (On loan from (Russia) CSKA Moskva)
—	DF	BRA	Gustavo Nery (Free transfer)
—	GK	BRA	Ricardo (On loan from (Brazil) Caxias)
—	DF	BRA	Ricardo Lopes (On loan from (Brazil) Sertãozinho)
—	MF	BRA	Rosinei (From (Spain) Real Murcia)

=== Transfers out ===
—	GK	BRA	Bruno Grassi (to (Portugal) Marítimo)
—	FW	BRA	Christian (to (Brazil) Portuguesa)
—	DF	BRA	Douglão (return to (Brazil) Coritiba on loan to (Brazil) Rio Claro)
—	DF	BRA	Élder Granja (Free transfer to (Brazil) Palmeiras)
—	FW	BRA	Fernandão (to (Qatar) Al Gharafa)
—	FW	BRA	Gustavo (Free transfer to (Brazil) Brasiliense)
—	FW	BRA	Iarley (Free transfer to (Brazil) Goiás)
—	MF	BRA	João Guilherme (to (Portugal) Marítimo)
—	FW	BRA	Jean (return to (Brazil) São Caetano)
—	FW	BRA	Léo Gamalho (to (Portugal) Valdevez)
—	MF	BRA	Luciano Henrique (Return loan to (Brazil) Santos)
—	MF	BRA	Magal (Return loan to (Brazil) Guaratinguetá)
—	MF	BRA	Rodrigo Possebon (to (England) Manchester United)
—	DF	BRA	Rubens Cardoso (Free transfer to (Brazil) Coritiba)
—	DF	BRA	Sidnei (to (Portugal) Benfica)

=== Players on loan ===
—	MF	NGR	Abu (to (Brazil) Vasco da Gama)
—	MF	BRA	Adriano Gabiru (to (Brazil) Goiás)
—	MF	BRA	Cleiton Xavier (to (Brazil) Figueirense)
—	FW	COL	Cristian Borja (to (Brazil) Mogi Mirim)
—	FW	BRA	Diego (to (China) Guangzhou Pharmaceutical)
—	DF	BRA	Ediglê (to (Portugal) Marítimo)
—	GK	BRA	Eduardo (to (Brazil) Portuguesa)
—	FW	BRA	Gil (to (Brazil) Botafogo)
—	FW	BRA	Léo (to (Brazil) Coritiba)
—	DF	BRA	Mineiro (to (Japan) Gamba Osaka)
—	MF	BRA	Pinga (to (United Arab Emirates) Al-Wahda)
—	MF	BRA	Roger (to (Brazil) Náutico)
—	FW	BRA	Wellington (to (Brazil) Náutico)

== Season 2008 ==
=== Dubai Cup ===
==== Matches ====
5 January 2008
12h00 (UTC-3)

Internacional	1 – 0	Stuttgart
Alex 29'	(pt)

Stadium Dubai Sports City-Dubai

7 January 2008
15h (UTC-3)

Internacional	2 – 1	Internazionale
Fernandão 2'; Nilmar 66'	(pt)	Jiménez 40'

Stadium Dubai Sports City-Dubai

==== Friendly ====
12 January 2008
14h00 (UTC-3)

Internacional	1 – 0	Al-Jazira
Adriano 45'	(pt)

Al Jazira Mohammed Bin Zayed Stadium-Abu Dhabi

=== Campeonato Gaúcho ===
==== Matches ====
20 January 2008
16h00 (UTC-3)

Internacional (SM)	2 – 2	Internacional
Alê Menezes 11'; Jean Michel 77'	(pt)	Monteiro 15'; Iarley 16'

Presidente Vargas Stadium-Santa Maria

24 January 2008
21h45 (UTC-3)

Internacional	2 – 0	Veranópolis
Iarley 28'; Ramon 71'	(pt)

Beira-Rio Stadium -Porto Alegre
Attendance: 16.751

27 January 2008
16h00 (UTC-3)

São José	1 – 4	Internacional
Júnior Paulista 44'	(pt)	Alex 14' 70'; Marcão 45', 2'; Iarley 48'

Passo D'Areia Stadium -Porto Alegre

1 February 2008
19h30 (UTC-3)

Internacional	0 – 1	Juventude
	(pt)	Mendes 17'

Beira-Rio Stadium -Porto Alegre
Attendance: 18.099

10 February 2008
16h00 (UTC-3)

Brasil Pelotas	0 – 5	Internacional
	(pt)	Alex 27'; Marcão 57' 88'; Iarley 81'; Bustos 89'

Bento Freitas Stadium -Pelotas

16 February 2008
16h (UTC-3)

Internacional	2 – 0	Guarany
Fernandão 1'; Alex 60'	(pt)

Beira-Rio Stadium -Porto Alegre
Attendance: 19.455

20 February 2008
21h45 (UTC-3)

São Luiz	1 – 1	Internacional
Diego Biro 52'	(pt)	Guto 75'

19 de Outubro Stadium -Ijuí

23 February 2008
16h (UTC-3)

Internacional	3 – 0	São Luiz
Alex 11'; Danny 29'; Índio 82'	pt

Beira-Rio Stadium - Porto Alegre
Attendance: 20.992

2 March 2008
16h (UTC-3)

Guarany	0 – 6	Internacional
	pt	Alex 27' 52'; Iarley 63' 73'; Gil 76' 80'

Estrela D’Alva Stadium - Bagé

8 March 2008
18h30 (UTC-3)

Internacional	2 – 0	Brasil Pelotas
Magrão 15'; Gil 83'	pt

Beira-Rio Stadium - Porto Alegre
Attendance: 46.472

12 March 2008
21h45 (UTC-3)

Juventude	3 – 0	Internacional
Mendes 66'; Maycon 78'; Hélder 88'	pt

Alfredo Jaconi Stadium – Caxias do Sul

15 March 2008
18h30 (UTC-3)

Internacional	2 – 0	São José
Marcão 11' 56'	pt

Beira-Rio Stadium - Porto Alegre
Attendance: 21.513

23 March 2008
16h (UTC-3)

Veranópolis	1 – 3	Internacional
Sandro Sotilli 74'	pt	Gil 27'; Adriano (45;+1) 72'

Antonio David Farina Stadium - Veranópolis

27 March 2008
19h30 (UTC-3)

Internacional	2 – 0	Internacional (SM)
Ramon 17'; Adriano 35'	pt

Beira-Rio Stadium - Porto Alegre
Attendance: 10.781

==== Classification ====
Group 2

Pos	Club	Pld	W	D	L	F	A	GD	Pts
1	Internacional	14	10	2	2	34	9	+25	32
2	Internacional (SM)	14	7	5	2	25	20	+5	26
3	São José	14	6	4	4	19	20	-1	22

==== Quarter-finals ====
30 March 2008
16h (UTC-3)

Ulbra	1 – 4	Internacional
Edílson 74'	pt	Guiñazú 30'; Alex 46' 78'; Cadu o.g. 54'

Complexo Esportivo Ulbra Stadium - Canoas

5 April 2008
16h (UTC-3)

Internacional	3 – 2	Ulbra
Fernandão 6'; Iarley 27'; Magrão 89'	pt	Jaques 19' 72'

Beira-Rio Stadium - Porto Alegre
Attendance: 21.972

==== Semi-finals ====
13 April 2008
16h (UTC-3)

Caxias	0 – 1	Internacional
	pt	Alex (90;+2)

Centenário Stadium - Caxias do Sul

20 April 2008
16h (UTC-3)

Internacional	2 – 1	Caxias
Alex 21' 29'	pt	Flávio Guilherme 79'

Beira-Rio Stadium - Porto Alegre
Attendance: 35.529

==== Finals ====
27 April 2008
16h (UTC-3)

Juventude	1 – 0	Internacional
Maycon (90;+3)	pt

Alfredo Jaconi Stadium - Caxias do Sul

4 May 2008
16h (UTC-3)

Internacional	8 – 1	Juventude
Danny 25'; Fernandão 29' 31' 49'; Alex 37'; Nilmar 54'; Índio 77'; Clemer 90'	pt	Índio o.g. 56'

Beira-Rio Stadium - Porto Alegre
Attendance: 42.866

==== Results summary ====
Overall								Home						Away					
Pld	W	D	L	GF	GA	GD	Pts	W	D	L	GF	GA	GD	W	D	L	GF	GA	GD
20	15	2	3	52	15	+37	47	9	0	1	26	5	+21	6	2	2	26	10	+16

Last updated: 5 May 2008.
Source: Campeonato Gaúcho

Pld = Matches played; W = Matches won; D = Matches drawn; L = Matches lost;

=== Copa do Brasil ===
==== First round ====
27 February 2008
21h45 (UTC-3)

Nacional (PB)	0 – 4	Internacional
	pt	Alex 20' Guiñazú 30'; Magrão 59'; Fernandão 90'

José Cavalcanti Stadium - Patos

==== Second round ====
19 March 2008
21h45 (UTC-3)

Chapecoense	0 – 2	Internacional
	pt	Alex 74'; Adriano 90'

Regional Índio Condá Stadium - Chapecó

==== Round of 16 ====
16 April 2008
21h45 (UTC-3)

Paraná	2 – 0	Internacional
Ângelo 50'; Fábio Luiz 81'	pt

Vila Capanema Stadium - Curitiba

23 April 2008
21h45 (UTC-3)

Internacional	5 – 1	Paraná
Andrezinho 4' 41'; Índio 31'; Magrão 63'; Fernandão (90;+3)	pt	Fábio Luiz 3'

Beira-Rio Stadium - Porto Alegre
Attendance: 41.837

==== Quarter-finals ====
7 May 2008
21h45 (UTC-3)

Internacional	1 – 0	Sport
Alex 53'	pt

Beira-Rio Stadium - Porto Alegre
Attendance: 41.766

14 May 2008
21h45 (UTC-3)

Sport	3 – 1	Internacional
Leandro Machado 29'; Roger 61'; Durval 78'	pt	Sidnei 29'

Ilha do Retiro Stadium - Recife

=== Campeonato Brasileiro ===
==== Matches ====
11 May 2008
16h (UTC-3)

Internacional	1 – 0	Vasco da Gama
Sidnei 2'	pt

Beira Rio Stadium - Porto Alegre
Attendance: 25.744

18 May 2008
18h10 (UTC-3)

Palmeiras	2 – 1	Internacional
Denílson 29'; Alex Mineiro 60'	pt	Índio (45;+2)

Palestra Itália Stadium - São Paulo

24 May 2008
18h10 (UTC-3)

Flamengo	2 – 1	Internacional
Marcinho 50'; Souza 55'	pt	Nilmar 33'

Maracanã Stadium - Rio de Janeiro

31 May 2008
18h10 (UTC-3)

Internacional	1 – 1	Sport
Alex 5'	pt	Leandro Machado 13'

Beira Rio Stadium - Porto Alegre
Attendance: 16.677

8 June 2008
16h (UTC-3)

Portuguesa	3 – 1	Internacional
Washington 46'; Bruno Rodrigo 56'; Diogo 65'	pt	Nilmar 9'

Canindé Stadium - São Paulo

14 June 2008
16h (UTC-3)

Internacional	2 – 1	Botafogo
Edinho 6'; Adriano 17'	pt	Alessandro (90;+3)

Beira Rio Stadium - Porto Alegre
Attendance: 20.694

22 June 2008
16h (UTC-3)

Vitória	2 – 1	Internacional
Marquinhos 17'; Williams 31'	pt	Nilmar 67'

Barradão Stadium - Salvador

29 June 2008
18h10 (UTC-3)

Grêmio	1 – 1	Internacional
Roger 82'	pt	Índio 15'

Olímpico Stadium - Porto Alegre

6 July 2008
16h (UTC-3)

Internacional	3 – 0	Coritiba
Alex 29' 69' 74'	pt

Beira Rio Stadium - Porto Alegre
Attendance: 27.528

10 July 2008
19h30 (UTC-3)

Internacional	1 – 0	Goiás
Adriano 48'	pt

Beira Rio Stadium - Porto Alegre
Attendance: 26.535

13 July 2008
19h30 (UTC-3)

Atlético (PR)	1 – 1	Internacional
Alan Bahia 13'	pt	Índio 82'

Arena da Baixada Stadium - Curitiba

17 July 2008
20h30 (UTC-3)

Internacional	1 – 0	Atlético Mineiro
Nilmar 6'	pt

Beira Rio Stadium - Porto Alegre
Attendance: 27.496

20 July 2008
16h (UTC-3)

Nautico	1 – 1	Internacional
Radamés 60'	pt	Nilmar 86'

Aflitos Stadium - Recife

23 July 2008
21h45 (UTC-3)

Internacional	2 – 0	São Paulo
Nilmar 35' 62'	pt

Beira Rio Stadium - Porto Alegre
Attendance: 41.674

26 July 2008
18h10 (UTC-3)

Ipatinga	1 – 0	Internacional
Beto 77'

Ipatingão Stadium - Ipatinga

30 July 2008
21h45 (UTC-3)

Internacional	0 – 1	Santos
		Maicon Leite 65'

Beira Rio Stadium - Porto Alegre
Attendance: 22.228

2 August 2008
18h10 (UTC-3)

Fluminense	1 – 2	Internacional
Somália 72'		Nilmar 5' 27'

Maracanã Stadium - Rio de Janeiro

7 August 2008
20h30 (UTC-3)

Cruzeiro	2 – 0	Internacional
Gérson Magrão 3'; Sorondo o.g. 47'

Mineirão Stadium - Belo Horizonte

10 August 2008
18h10 (UTC-3)

Internacional	1 – 1	Figueirense
Nilmar 32'		Diogo 24'

Beira Rio Stadium - Porto Alegre

17 August 2008
16h (UTC-3)

Vasco da Gama	4 – 0	Internacional
Bolívar o.g. 19'; Edmundo 47'; Eduardo Luiz 51'; Jean 88'

São Januário Stadium - Rio de Janeiro

20 August 2008
20h30 (UTC-3)

Internacional	4 – 1	Palmeiras
Índio 18' 61'; Alex 19'; Taison 85'		Alex Mineiro 4'

Beira Rio Stadium - Porto Alegre
Attendance: 14.470

24 August 2008
16h (UTC-3)

Internacional	1 – 1	Flamengo
Nilmar 14'		Obina 60'

Beira Rio Stadium - Porto Alegre
Attendance: 33.927

31 August 2008
16h (UTC-3)

Sport	1 – 0	Internacional
Dutra 58'

Ilha do Retiro Stadium - Recife

6 September 2008
16h (UTC-3)

Internacional	1 – 0	Portuguesa
Magrão 28'

Beira Rio Stadium - Porto Alegre
Attendance: 9.349

14 September 2008
16h (UTC-3)

Botafogo	1 – 2	Internacional
André Luiz 58'		Alex 29'; D'Alessandro 50'

João Havelange Stadium - Rio de Janeiro

21 September 2008
16h (UTC-3)

Internacional	1 – 0	Vitória
Alex 31'

Beira Rio Stadium - Porto Alegre
Attendance: 22.547

28 September 2008
16h (UTC-3)

Internacional	4 – 1	Grêmio
D'Alessandro 4'; Alex 28'; Índio 34'; Nilmar 44'		Tcheco 18'

Beira Rio Stadium - Porto Alegre
Attendance: 42.590

4 October 2008
16h (UTC-3)

Coritiba	4 – 2	Internacional
Índio o.g. 15'; Keirrison 52' 78'; Sandro o.g. 74'		Maurício o.g. 9'; Nilmar 79'

Couto Pereira Stadium - Coritiba

11 October 2008
16h (UTC-3)

Goiás	1 – 1	Internacional
Fahel 36'		Andrezinho 7'

Serra Dourada Stadium - Goiânia

19 October 2008
16h (UTC-3)

Internacional	2 – 1	Atlético (PR)
Nilmar 37'; Alex 74'		Ferreira 78'

Beira Rio Stadium - Porto Alegre
Attendance: 15.813

25 October 2008
16h (UTC-3)

Atlético Mineiro	2 – 2	Internacional
Castillo 6'; Pedro Paulo 73'		Alex 50'; Sandro 68'

Mineirão Stadium - Belo Horizonte

29 October 2008
20h30 (UTC-3)

Internacional	1 – 1	Nautico
Ângelo 85'		Vágner 90+3'

Beira Rio Stadium - Porto Alegre
Attendance: 14.464

2 November 2008
16h (UTC-3)

São Paulo	3 – 0	Internacional
Borges 29'; Dagoberto 52'; Hugo 90+3'<81>

Morumbi Stadium - Sãp Paulo

9 November 2008
16h (UTC-3)

Internacional	4 – 0	Ipatinga
Andrezinho 20'; Taison 28'; Sandro 37'; Guto 60'

Beira Rio Stadium - Porto Alegre
Attendance: 8.136

16 November 2008
16h (UTC-3)

Santos	1 – 0	Internacional
Quinõnez 69'

Vila Belmiro Stadium - Santos

23 November 2008
16h (UTC-3)

Internacional	0 – 2	Fluminense
		Romeu 15'; Washington 67'

Beira Rio Stadium - Porto Alegre
Attendance: 7.481

30 November 2008
16h (UTC-3)

Internacional	1 – 0	Cruzeiro
Gustavo Nery 14'	pt

Beira Rio Stadium - Porto Alegre
Attendance: 13.269

7 December 2008
16h (UTC-3)

Figueirense	3 – 1	Internacional
Marquinho 52', Rafael Coelho 68', Cleiton Xavier 71'	pt	Tales Cunha 25'

Orlando Scarpelli Stadium - Florianópolis

==== Classification ====
Pos	Club	Pld	W	D	L	F	A	GD	Pts
7	Flamengo	37	18	10	9	64	43	+21	64
8	Internacional	37	15	9	13	47	44	+3	54
9	Goiás	37	14	11	12	57	46	+11	52

==== Results summary ====
Overall								Home						Away					
Pld	W	D	L	GF	GA	GD	Pts	W	D	L	GF	GA	GD	W	D	L	GF	GA	GD
37	15	9	13	47	44	+3	54	13	4	2	31	11	+20	2	5	11	16	33	−17

Last updated: 2 December 2008.
Source: Campeonato Brasileiro 2008

Pld = Matches played; W = Matches won; D = Matches drawn; L = Matches lost;

=== Copa Sudamericana ===
==== First round ====
13 August 2008
22h00 (UTC-3)

Internacional	1 – 1	Grêmio
Daniel Carvalho 59'		Léo 63'

Beira-Rio Stadium - Porto Alegre
Attendance: 28.921

28 August 2008
19h20 (UTC-3)

Grêmio	2 – 2	Internacional
Perea 83'; Soares 88'		Nilmar 47'; Índio 70'

Olímpico Stadium - Porto Alegre

==== Round of 16 ====
25 September 2008
22h15 (UTC-3)

Universidad	1 – 1	Internacional
Barrientos 43'		Adriano 85'

San Carlos Stadium - Santiago

1 October 2008
17h00 (UTC-3)

Internacional	0 – 0	Universidad

Beira-Rio Stadium - Porto Alegre
Attendance: 22.620

==== Quarter-finals ====
22 October 2008
22h05 (UTC-3)

Internacional	2 – 0	Boca Juniors
Alex 49' 88'

Beira-Rio Stadium - Porto Alegre
Attendance: 36.640

6 November 2008
21h00 (UTC-3)

Boca Juniors	1 – 2	Internacional
Riquelme 57'		Magrão 46'; Alex 72'

La Bombonera Stadium - Buenos Aires

==== Semi-finals ====
12 November 2008
22h00 (UTC-3)

Chivas	0 – 2	Internacional
		Nilmar 69'; Alex 78'

Jalisco Stadium - Guadalajara

19 November 2008
22h00 (UTC-3)

Internacional	4 – 0	Chivas
D'Alessandro 19' 36'; Nilmar 43' 70'

Beira-Rio Stadium - Porto Alegre
Attendance: 37.703

==== Finals ====
26 November 2008
22h00 (UTC-3)

Estudiantes	0 – 1	Internacional
	pt	Alex 34'

Ciudad de La Plata Stadium - La Plata

3 December 2008
22h00 (UTC-3)

Internacional	1 – 1(a.e.t.)	Estudiantes
Nilmar (90+23(a.e.t.))	pt	Alayes 66'

Beira-Rio Stadium - Porto Alegre
Attendance: 51.803
