= 2003 Campeonato Gaúcho =

Campeonato Gaúcho
- Season: 2003
- Champions: Internacional
- Relegated: Palmeirense; São Luiz
- Copa do Brasil: Internacional; Grêmio; 15 de Novembro; Juventude; São Gabriel
- Série C: Pelotas; São José-POA
- Matches: 200
- Goals: 568 (2.84 per match)
- Top goalscorer: Flávio Dias (Pelotas) – 18 goals
- Biggest home win: 15 de Novembro 8-0 Passo Fundo (May 18, 2003)
- Biggest away win: Passo Fundo 2–5 Santo Ângelo (March 9, 2003); São José-CS 1-4 Guarani-VA (March 16, 2003); Veranópolis 0-3 Esportivo (April 6, 2003)
- Highest scoring: Caxias 3-5 Juventude (March 8, 2003); 15 de Novembro 8-0 Passo Fundo (May 18, 2003)

The 83rd season of the Campeonato Gaúcho kicked off on February 1, 2003, and ended on July 3, 2003. Eighteen teams participated. Holders Internacional beat 15 de Novembro in the finals, winning their 35th title. São Luiz and Palmeirense were relegated.

== Participating teams ==
Club	Home location	Previous season
15 de Novembro	Campo Bom	2nd
Caxias	Caxias do Sul	9th
Esportivo	Bento Gonçalves	8th
Glória	Vacaria	2nd (Second level)
Grêmio	Porto Alegre	4th
Guarani	Venâncio Aires	6th
Internacional	Porto Alegre	1st
Juventude	Caxias do Sul	3rd
Palmeirense	Palmeira das Missões	16th
Passo Fundo	Passo Fundo	13th
Pelotas	Pelotas	5th
São Gabriel	São Gabriel	7th
São José	Cachoeira do Sul	1st (Second level)
São José	Porto Alegre	12th
São Luiz	Ijuí	11th
Santa Cruz	Santa Cruz do Sul	14th
Santo Ângelo	Santo Ângelo	10th
Veranópolis	Veranópolis	15th

== System ==
The championship would have four stages:

- Group A: The four teams in the Série A and Série B (Internacional, Grêmio, Caxias and Juventude) played each other in a double round-robin system; the two best teams qualified into the Semifinals.
- Group B: The fourteen teams that didn't participate in the Série A or Série B played against each other in a double round-robin system. After 26 rounds, the two best teams qualified to the Semifinals and the bottom two teams were relegated.
- Semifinals: The four remaining teams played in a two matches to define the teams that would qualify to the Finals. In case of ties, group leaders would advance.
- Finals: Semifinals winners played in two matches to define the Champions. The team with best overall record played the second leg at home.

== Championship ==
=== Group A ===
Pos	Team	Pld	W	D	L	GF	GA	GD	Pts	Qualification or relegation
1	Internacional	6	3	2	1	9	8	+1	11	Qualified
2	Juventude	6	2	4	0	14	11	+3	10	Qualified
3	Caxias	6	2	2	2	8	7	+1	8	
4	Grêmio	6	0	2	4	5	10	−5	2	

Updated to match(es) played on March 16, 2003. Source: RSSSF.com
Rules for classification: 1) points; 2) wins; 3) goal difference; 4) number of goals scored.

=== Group B ===
Pos	Team	Pld	W	D	L	GF	GA	GD	Pts	Qualification or relegation
1	15 de Novembro	26	12	9	5	42	23	+19	45	Qualified
2	São Gabriel	26	13	5	8	42	34	+8	44	Qualified
3	Santa Cruz	26	13	3	10	39	33	+6	42	
4	Glória	26	12	6	8	39	28	+11	42	
5	São José de Cachoeira do Sul	26	12	4	10	48	36	+12	40	
6	Guarani de Venâncio Aires	26	11	7	8	39	35	+4	40	
7	Santo Ângelo	26	11	7	8	37	30	+7	40	
8	Esportivo	26	10	8	8	37	31	+6	38	
9	São José de Porto Alegre	26	8	11	7	39	34	+5	35	
10	Pelotas	26	9	7	10	45	40	+5	34	
11	Passo Fundo	26	10	3	13	33	59	−26	33	
12	Veranópolis	26	9	5	12	29	42	−13	32	
13	Palmeirense	26	5	6	15	25	52	−27	21	Relegated
14	São Luiz	26	4	6	16	25	42	−17	18	Relegated

Updated to match(es) played on June 29, 2003. Source: RSSSF.com
Rules for classification: 1) points; 2) wins; 3) goal difference; 4) number of goals scored.

=== Semifinals ===
Team 1	Agg.	Team 2	1st leg	2nd leg
Juventude	2–2	15 de Novembro	2–2	0–0
São Gabriel	1–5	Internacional	0–1	1–4

=== Finals ===
Team 1	Agg.	Team 2	1st leg	2nd leg
15 de Novembro	0–3	Internacional	0–2	0–1

25 June 2003
Finals

15 de Novembro	0 – 2	Internacional
		Nilmar 36'; Daniel Carvalho 50'

Sady Schmidt, Campo Bom
Referee: Vinicius Costa
3 July 2003
Finals

Internacional	1 – 0	15 de Novembro
Flávio 36'

Beira-Rio, Porto Alegre
Referee: Carlos Eugênio Simon
