= 2002 Campeonato Gaúcho =

Campeonato Gaúcho
- Season: 2002
- Champions: Internacional
- Relegated: São Paulo
- Copa do Brasil: Internacional; Pelotas; Juventude; Guarani-VA
- Série C: São Gabriel
- Matches played: 174
- Goals scored: 507 (2.91 per match)
- Top goalscorer: Sandro Sotilli (15 de Novembro) – 20 goals
- Biggest home win: São Gabriel 6-0 Esportivo (May 5, 2002)
- Biggest away win: Veranópolis 0-3 Esportivo (March 17, 2002); Palmeirense 0-3 Passo Fundo (March 17, 2002)
- Highest scoring: 15 de Novembro 4-4 Santa Cruz (March 4, 2002); Passo Fundo 4-4 São Gabriel (May 1, 2002)

The 82nd season of the Campeonato Gaúcho kicked off on January 13, 2002 and ended on May 29, 2002. Seventeen teams participated. Holders Grêmio were eliminated in the Semifinals, while Internacional beat 15 de Novembro in the finals and won their 34th title. São Paulo was relegated.

== Participating teams ==
Club	Home location	Previous season
15 de Novembro	Campo Bom	10th
Caxias	Caxias do Sul	5th
Esportivo	Bento Gonçalves	8th
Grêmio	Porto Alegre	1st
Guarani	Venâncio Aires	9th
Internacional	Porto Alegre	3rd
Juventude	Caxias do Sul	2nd
Palmeirense	Palmeira das Missões	1st (Second level)
Passo Fundo	Passo Fundo	11th
Pelotas	Pelotas	4th
São Gabriel	São Gabriel	2nd (Second level)
São José	Porto Alegre	6th
São Luiz	Ijuí	12th
São Paulo	Rio Grande	14th
Santa Cruz	Santa Cruz do Sul	7th
Santo Ângelo	Santo Ângelo	15th
Veranópolis	Veranópolis	13th

== System ==
The championship would have three stages:

- First phase: The thirteen teams that didn't participate in the Copa Sul-Minas played against each other in a double round-robin system. After 26 rounds, the champion of each of the halves of the stage and the two teams with the best overall record qualified to the Semifinals and the bottom team was relegated. The teams that qualified to the Semifinals would also play a playoff tournament, the winner of which would qualify to the Copa do Brasil.
- Semifinals: The four remaining teams joined the teams that participated in the Copa Sul-Minas (Internacional, Grêmio, Pelotas and Juventude), and the eight teams were divided in two groups of four teams, the teams in each group playing against each other once, and the group winners qualifying to the Finals.
- Finals: Semifinals winners played in two matches to define the Champions.

== Championship ==
=== First phase ===
==== First round ====
Pos	Team	Pld	W	D	L	GF	GA	GD	Pts	Qualification or relegation
1	São Gabriel	12	8	0	4	23	14	+9	24	Qualified to Semifinals
2	15 de Novembro	12	7	3	2	17	17	0	24	
3	Esportivo	12	7	1	4	18	15	+3	22	
4	São Luiz	12	6	4	2	16	10	+6	22	
5	Santa Cruz	12	6	3	3	23	14	+9	21	
6	Caxias	12	5	2	5	17	16	+1	17	
7	Passo Fundo	12	5	2	5	13	18	−5	17	
8	Santo Ângelo	12	5	1	6	37	30	+7	16	
9	Veranópolis	12	4	3	5	15	16	−1	15	
10	São José de Porto Alegre	12	4	2	6	18	17	+1	14	
11	São Paulo	12	3	2	7	48	36	+12	11	
12	Palmeirense	12	3	1	8	12	24	−12	10	
13	Guarani de Venâncio Aires	12	0	6	6	9	22	−13	6	

Updated to match(es) played on March 11, 2002. Source: RSSSF.com
Rules for classification: 1) points; 2) wins; 3) goal difference;4) number of goals scored.

==== Second round ====
Pos	Team	Pld	W	D	L	GF	GA	GD	Pts	Qualification or relegation
1	Guarani de Venâncio Aires	12	8	3	1	22	11	+11	27	Qualified to Semifinals
2	São Gabriel	12	7	4	1	20	10	+10	25	
3	Caxias	12	7	2	3	20	13	+7	23	
4	Esportivo	12	7	0	5	24	20	+4	21	
5	Santo Ângelo	12	6	3	3	25	15	+10	21	
6	15 de Novembro	12	6	3	3	23	16	+7	21	
7	São José de Porto Alegre	12	6	1	5	15	18	−3	19	
8	Passo Fundo	12	4	2	6	22	22	0	14	
9	São Luiz	12	3	4	5	21	20	+1	13	
10	Palmeirense	12	3	1	8	8	21	−13	10	
11	Veranópolis	12	2	4	6	15	23	−8	10	
12	Santa Cruz	12	2	3	7	12	21	−9	9	
13	São Paulo	12	1	2	9	11	28	−17	5	

Updated to match(es) played on May 1, 2002. Source: RSSSF.com
Rules for classification: 1) points; 2) wins; 3) goal difference; 4) number of goals scored.

==== Final standings ====
Pos	Team	Pld	W	D	L	GF	GA	GD	Pts	Qualification or relegation
1	São Gabriel	24	15	4	5	43	24	+19	49	Qualified as round winners
2	15 de Novembro	24	13	6	5	49	32	+17	45	Qualified
3	Esportivo	24	14	1	9	42	35	+7	43	Qualified
4	Caxias	24	12	4	8	37	29	+8	40	
5	Santo Ângelo	23	11	3	9	42	31	+11	36	
6	São Luiz	24	9	8	7	37	30	+7	35	
7	São José de Porto Alegre	24	10	3	11	33	35	−2	33	
8	Guarani de Venâncio Aires	24	8	9	7	31	33	−2	33	Qualified as round winners
9	Passo Fundo	24	9	4	11	35	40	−5	31	
10	Santa Cruz	24	8	6	10	35	35	0	30	
11	Veranópolis	24	6	7	11	30	39	−9	25	
12	Palmeirense	24	6	2	16	20	45	−25	20	
13	São Paulo	24	4	4	16	23	48	−25	16	Relegated

Updated to match(es) played on May 1, 2002. Source: RSSSF.com
Rules for classification: 1) points; 2) wins; 3) goal difference; 4) number of goals scored.

==== Semifinals ====
Team 1	Score	Team 2
Guarani de Venâncio Aires	1–1 (a.e.t.)	15 de Novembro
São Gabriel	6–0	Esportivo

==== Finals ====
Team 1	Agg.	Team 2	1st leg	2nd leg
Guarani de Venâncio Aires	1–0	São Gabriel	0–0	1–0

=== Group I ===
Pos	Team	Pld	W	D	L	GF	GA	GD	Pts	Qualification or relegation
1	Internacional	3	2	1	0	4	1	+3	7	Qualified
2	Juventude	3	2	0	1	6	4	+2	6	
3	São Gabriel	3	1	0	2	4	6	−2	3	
4	Esportivo	3	0	1	2	3	6	−3	1	

Updated to match(es) played on May 26, 2002. Source: RSSSF.com
Rules for classification: 1) points; 2) wins; 3) goal difference; 4) number of goals scored.

=== Group II ===
Pos	Team	Pld	W	D	L	GF	GA	GD	Pts	Qualification or relegation
1	15 de Novembro	3	2	0	1	7	5	+2	6	Qualified
2	Grêmio	3	1	1	1	3	4	−1	4	
3	Pelotas	3	1	1	1	3	4	−1	4	
4	Guarani de Venâncio Aires	3	1	0	2	4	4	0	3	

Updated to match(es) played on May 26, 2002. Source: RSSSF.com
Rules for classification: 1) points; 2) wins; 3) goal difference; 4) number of goals scored.

=== Finals ===
Team 1	Agg.	Team 2	1st leg	2nd leg
15 de Novembro	2–5	Internacional	2–3	0–2

29 May 2002
Finals

15 de Novembro	2 – 3	Internacional
Cléber 42', 65'		Diogo Rincón 1'; Fernando Baiano 54', 75'

Sady Schmidt, Campo Bom
Referee: Alexandre Lourenço Barreto
2 June 2002
Finals

Internacional	2 – 0	15 de Novembro
Fábio Pinto 45+1'; Fernando Baiano 90+3'

Beira-Rio, Porto Alegre
Attendance: 34,951
Referee: Leonardo Gaciba
