= 2004 Campeonato Gaúcho =

Campeonato Gaúcho
- Season: 2004
- Champions: Internacional
- Relegated: Santo Ângelo; Pelotas
- Copa do Brasil: Internacional; Ulbra; Juventude; Esportivo (Copa FGF winners)
- Série C: Glória; Esportivo (Copa FGF winners); Ulbra
- Matches played: 222
- Goals scored: 624 (2.81 per match)
- Top goalscorer: Sandro Sotilli (Glória) – 27 goals
- Biggest home win: Grêmio 7-0 Caxias (February 21, 2004)
- Biggest away win: São Gabriel 0–3 Novo Hamburgo (March 28, 2004); Pelotas 0-3 Veranópolis (April 4, 2004); Guarani-VA 0-3 Passo Fundo (April 7, 2004); Guarani-VA 0-3 São Gabriel (April 14, 2004)
- Highest scoring: 15 de Novembro 6-4 Esportivo (March 31, 2004)

The 84th season of the Campeonato Gaúcho kicked off on February 1, 2004 and ended on June 6, 2004. Eighteen teams participated. Holders Internacional beat Ulbra in the finals, winning their 36th title. Santo Ângelo and Pelotas were relegated.

== Participating teams ==
Club	Home location	Previous season
15 de Novembro	Campo Bom	2nd
Caxias	Caxias do Sul	5th
Esportivo	Bento Gonçalves	12th
Glória	Vacaria	8th
Grêmio	Porto Alegre	6th
Guarani	Venâncio Aires	10th
Internacional	Porto Alegre	1st
Juventude	Caxias do Sul	4th
Novo Hamburgo	Novo Hamburgo	2nd (Second level)
Passo Fundo	Passo Fundo	15th
Pelotas	Pelotas	14th
São Gabriel	São Gabriel	3rd
São José	Cachoeira do Sul	9th
São José	Porto Alegre	13th
Santa Cruz	Santa Cruz do Sul	7th
Santo Ângelo	Santo Ângelo	11th
Ulbra	Canoas	1st (Second level)
Veranópolis	Veranópolis	16th

== System ==
The championship would have four stages:

- Group A: The four teams in the Série A and Série B (Internacional, Grêmio, Caxias and Juventude) and the four best teams in the previous year's championship were divided into two groups of four, with the teams in each group playing twice against the teams of the other group; the two best teams in each group qualified into the Group Semifinals, played in two matches, with the winners qualifying into the Championship Semifinals and to the Group Finals, played in one match.
- Group B: The fourteen teams that didn't participate in the Série A or Série B played against each other in a double round-robin system. After 26 rounds, the two best teams in each group qualified to the Semifinals. and the bottom two teams were relegated.
- Semifinals: The four remaining teams played in a single knockout match to define the teams that would qualify to the Finals.
- Finals: Semifinals group winners played in two matches to define the Champions. The team with best overall record played the second leg at home.

== Championship ==
=== Group A ===
==== Chave A ====
Pos	Team	Pld	W	D	L	GF	GA	GD	Pts	Qualification or relegation
1	Grêmio	8	5	1	2	21	9	+12	16	Qualified
2	Juventude	8	3	4	1	10	4	+6	13	Qualified
3	Santa Cruz	8	1	2	5	8	12	−4	5	
4	15 de Novembro	8	1	2	5	7	13	−6	5	

Updated to match(es) played on March 14, 2004. Source: RSSSF.com
Rules for classification: 1) points; 2) wins; 3) goal difference; 4) number of goals scored.

==== Chave B ====
Pos	Team	Pld	W	D	L	GF	GA	GD	Pts	Qualification or relegation
1	Internacional	8	4	3	1	12	9	+3	15	Qualified
2	Glória	8	4	3	1	9	6	+3	15	Qualified
3	Caxias	8	3	2	3	7	13	−6	11	
4	São Gabriel	8	2	1	5	10	18	−8	7	

Updated to match(es) played on March 14, 2004. Source: RSSSF.com
Rules for classification: 1) points; 2) wins; 3) goal difference; 4) number of goals scored.

==== Semifinals ====
Team 1	Agg.	Team 2	1st leg	2nd leg
Juventude	4–4 (a)	Internacional	2–3	2–1
Glória	1–3	Grêmio	0–1	1–2

==== Finals ====
Team 1	Score	Team 2
Grêmio	1–2	Internacional

=== Group B ===
Pos	Team	Pld	W	D	L	GF	GA	GD	Pts	Qualification or relegation
1	Ulbra	26	16	6	4	50	23	+27	54	Qualified
2	Glória	26	14	8	4	42	20	+22	50	Qualified
3	15 de Novembro	26	13	6	7	52	40	+12	45	
4	Santa Cruz	26	11	8	7	46	33	+13	41	
5	Esportivo	26	11	5	10	46	44	+2	38	
6	Passo Fundo	26	9	10	7	39	39	0	37	
7	Novo Hamburgo	26	9	10	7	31	33	−2	37	
8	São Gabriel	26	9	7	10	37	42	−5	34	
9	São José de Porto Alegre	26	9	6	11	33	38	−5	33	
10	Veranópolis	26	8	7	11	31	35	−4	31	
11	São José de Cachoeira do Sul	26	7	9	10	28	37	−9	30	
12	Guarani de Venâncio Aires	26	8	3	15	26	42	−16	27	
13	Santo Ângelo	26	5	9	12	32	47	−15	24	Relegated
14	Pelotas	26	0	12	14	21	41	−20	12	Relegated

Updated to match(es) played on May 30, 2004. Source: RSSSF.com
Rules for classification: 1) points; 2) wins; 3) goal difference; 4) number of goals scored.

=== Semifinals ===
Team 1	Score	Team 2
Ulbra	3–1	Grêmio
Internacional	2–2 (4-1 pen.)	Glória

=== Finals ===
6 June 2004
17:10 (UTC-3)
Finals

Ulbra	1 – 2	Internacional
Alex Martins 20'		Edinho 30'; Nilmar 61'

Complexo Esportivo da Ulbra, Canoas
Attendance: 7,119
Referee: Leandro Vuaden
