= 1999 Campeonato Gaúcho =

Campeonato Gaúcho
- Season: 1999
- Champions: Grêmio
- Relegated: 15 de Novembro; Brasil de Pelotas; Brasil de Farroupilha; Esportivo; Glória; Grêmio Bagé; Grêmio Santanense; Lajeadense; Novo Hamburgo; Palmeirense; Rio Grande; São José-CS; São Paulo; Taquariense; Torrense; Ypiranga de Erechim
- Copa do Brasil: Grêmio; Internacional; Juventude; Caxias
- Série C: Brasil de Pelotas
- Copa Sul-Minas: Internacional; Grêmio; Juventude
- Matches: 226
- Goals: 578 (2.56 per match)
- Top goalscorer: Ronaldinho Gaúcho (Grêmio) – 15 goals
- Biggest home win: Grêmio 8-0 Lajeadense (April 14, 1999)
- Biggest away win: Passo Fundo 0-3 Internacional (March 26, 1999); Novo Hamburgo 0-3 Grêmio Bagé (April 18, 1999); São Paulo 2-5 Rio Grande (April 21, 1999); Brasil de Pelotas 0-3 Passo Fundo (May 2, 1999)
- Highest scoring: Grêmio 8-0 Lajeadense (April 14, 1999)
- Longest unbeaten run: São José – 13 matches

The 79th season of the Campeonato Gaúcho kicked off on March 7, 1999 and ended on June 20, 1999. Thirty teams participated. Grêmio beat Internacional in the finals and won their 32nd title. Sixteen teams were relegated.

== Participating teams ==
Club	Home location	Previous season
15 de Novembro	Campo Bom	22nd
Avenida	Santa Cruz do Sul	2nd (Second level)
Brasil	Pelotas	8th
Brasil	Farroupilha	16th
Caxias	Caxias do Sul	18th
Esportivo	Bento Gonçalves	10th
Glória	Vacaria	8th
Grêmio	Bagé	4th (Second level)
Grêmio	Porto Alegre	5th
Grêmio	Santana do Livramento	15th
Guarani	Venâncio Aires	19th
Internacional	Porto Alegre	2nd
Internacional	Santa Maria	14th
Juventude	Caxias do Sul	1st
Lajeadense	Lajeado	13th
Novo Hamburgo	Novo Hamburgo	21st
Palmeirense	Palmeira das Missões	25th
Passo Fundo	Passo Fundo	23rd
Pelotas	Pelotas	17th
Rio Grande	Rio Grande	3rd (Second level)
São José	Cachoeira do Sul	24th
São José	Porto Alegre	9th
São Luiz	Ijuí	7th
São Paulo	Rio Grande	20th
Santa Cruz	Santa Cruz do Sul	6th
Santo Ângelo	Santo Ângelo	12th
Taquariense	Taquari	26th
Torrense	Torres	1st (Second level)
Veranópolis	Veranópolis	3rd
Ypiranga	Erechim	11th

== System ==
The championship would have seven stages:

- Division A: The eighteen teams that had qualified to Division A in the previous year were divided into three groups of six, in which each team played the teams of its own group in a double round-robin system. The four best teams in each group qualified to the Second phase, while the bottom two teams went to the Repechage. Caxias and Santo Ângelo, due to their performance in the 1998 Copa Ênio Andrade, were automatically qualified regardless of placing and earned an extra point in the Second phase.
- Division B: The eight teams that had qualified to Division B in the previous year joined the four teams that had been promoted from the Second level, and were divided into two groups of six, in which each team played the teams of its own group in a double round-robin system. the best team in each group qualified to the Repechage, while the others were relegated to the Second level of that same year.
- Second phase: The twelve remaining teams were divided into three groups of four, in which each team played the teams of its own group in a double round-robin system. The two best teams in each group qualified to the Quarterfinals.
- Repechage: The eight teams that had qualified to the repechage were divided into two groups of four, in which each team played the teams of its own group in a double round-robin system. The best team in each group qualified to the Quarterfinals. The six eliminated teams would also be relegated to the Second level.
- Quarterfinals: The eight remaining teams would play in two-legged knockout ties, with the winners going to the Semifinals.
- Semifinals: The semifinals would be played in an up-to-three matches series, with a team advancing after getting at least five points.
- Finals: Would be disputed in the same format as the Semifinals, with the winner being declared champions.

== Championship ==
=== Division A ===
==== Group 1 ====
Pos	Team	Pld	W	D	L	GF	GA	GD	Pts	Qualification or relegation
1	Veranópolis	10	6	2	2	22	15	+7	20	Qualified
2	Juventude	10	5	1	4	13	10	+3	16	Qualified
3	Santo Ângelo	10	4	2	4	11	12	−1	14	Qualified
4	Santa Cruz	10	4	1	5	13	13	0	13	Qualified
5	Ypiranga de Erechim	10	4	1	5	10	13	−3	13	Repechage
6	15 de Novembro	10	2	3	5	9	15	−6	9	Repechage

Updated to match(es) played on May 2, 1999. Source: RSSSF.com
Rules for classification: 1) points; 2) wins; 3) goal difference; 4) number of goals scored.

==== Group 2 ====
Pos	Team	Pld	W	D	L	GF	GA	GD	Pts	Qualification or relegation
1	Internacional	10	7	3	0	15	3	+12	24	Qualified
2	Caxias	10	6	2	2	12	5	+7	20	Qualified
3	São Luiz	10	5	1	4	9	6	+3	16	Qualified
4	Passo Fundo	10	4	1	5	11	11	0	13	Qualified
5	Brasil de Farroupilha	10	2	1	7	9	15	−6	7	Repechage
6	Brasil de Pelotas	10	2	0	8	3	19	−16	6	Repechage

Updated to match(es) played on May 2, 1999. Source: RSSSF.com
Rules for classification: 1) points; 2) wins; 3) goal difference; 4) number of goals scored.

==== Group 3 ====
Pos	Team	Pld	W	D	L	GF	GA	GD	Pts	Qualification or relegation
1	Grêmio	10	9	0	1	24	7	+17	27	Qualified
2	Internacional de Santa Maria	10	4	4	2	14	11	+3	16	Qualified
3	Pelotas	10	3	3	4	14	15	−1	12	Qualified
4	Guarani de Venâncio Aires	10	2	4	4	10	15	−5	10	Qualified
5	Esportivo	10	2	3	5	8	9	−1	9	Repechage
6	Lajeadense	10	2	2	6	9	23	−14	8	Repechage

Updated to match(es) played on May 2, 1999. Source: RSSSF.com
Rules for classification: 1) points; 2) wins; 3) goal difference; 4) number of goals scored.

=== Division B ===
==== Group 1 ====
Pos	Team	Pld	W	D	L	GF	GA	GD	Pts	Qualification or relegation
1	Avenida	10	6	3	1	12	5	+7	21	Repechage
2	Grêmio Bagé	10	5	5	0	20	7	+13	20	Relegated
3	Palmeirense	10	3	3	4	15	13	+2	12	Relegated
4	Taquariense	10	3	3	4	19	20	−1	12	Relegated
5	Glória	10	2	2	6	10	16	−6	8	Relegated
6	Novo Hamburgo	10	2	2	6	8	23	−15	8	Relegated

Updated to match(es) played on May 3, 1999. Source: RSSSF.com
Rules for classification: 1) points; 2) wins; 3) goal difference; 4) number of goals scored.

==== Group 2 ====
Pos	Team	Pld	W	D	L	GF	GA	GD	Pts	Qualification or relegation
1	São José de Porto Alegre	10	7	2	1	20	7	+13	23	Repechage
2	São José de Cachoeira do Sul	10	7	1	2	22	11	+11	22	Relegated
3	Rio Grande	10	3	3	4	13	15	−2	12	Relegated
4	São Paulo	10	3	2	5	12	15	−3	11	Relegated
5	Torrense	10	3	2	5	9	18	−9	11	Relegated
6	Grêmio Santanense	10	1	2	7	9	19	−10	5	Relegated

Updated to match(es) played on May 2, 1999. Source: RSSSF.com
Rules for classification: 1) points; 2) wins; 3) goal difference; 4) number of goals scored.

=== Second phase ===
==== Group 4 ====
Pos	Team	Pld	W	D	L	GF	GA	GD	Pts	Qualification or relegation
1	Juventude	6	3	1	2	13	7	+6	10	Qualified
2	Veranópolis	6	3	1	2	9	10	−1	10	Qualified
3	Guarani de Venâncio Aires	6	3	0	3	5	8	−3	9	
4	São Luiz	6	2	0	4	10	12	−2	6	

Updated to match(es) played on May 23, 1999. Source: RSSSF.com
Rules for classification: 1) points; 2) wins; 3) goal difference; 4) number of goals scored.

==== Group 5 ====
Pos	Team	Pld	W	D	L	GF	GA	GD	Pts	Qualification or relegation
1	Internacional	6	3	2	1	16	10	+6	11	Qualified
2	Santa Cruz	6	3	1	2	11	8	+3	10	Qualified
3	Santo Ângelo	6	2	2	2	10	8	+2	9	
4	Passo Fundo	6	1	1	4	9	20	−11	4	

Updated to match(es) played on May 23, 1999. Source: RSSSF.com
Rules for classification: 1) points; 2) wins; 3) goal difference; 4) number of goals scored.

==== Group 6 ====
Pos	Team	Pld	W	D	L	GF	GA	GD	Pts	Qualification or relegation
1	Grêmio	6	4	1	1	10	3	+7	13	Qualified
2	Caxias	6	2	2	2	4	5	−1	9	Qualified
3	Internacional de Santa Maria	6	2	2	2	7	7	0	8	
4	Pelotas	6	1	1	4	2	8	−6	4	

Updated to match(es) played on May 23, 1999. Source: RSSSF.com
Rules for classification: 1) points; 2) wins; 3) goal difference; 4) number of goals scored.

=== Repechage ===
==== Group 3 ====
Pos	Team	Pld	W	D	L	GF	GA	GD	Pts	Qualification or relegation
1	Avenida	6	3	2	1	12	4	+8	11	Qualified
2	Brasil de Pelotas	6	3	1	2	5	5	0	10	Relegated
3	15 de Novembro	6	2	1	3	6	8	−2	7	Relegated
4	Esportivo	6	1	2	3	3	9	−6	5	Relegated

Updated to match(es) played on May 23, 1999. Source: RSSSF.com
Rules for classification: 1) points; 2) wins; 3) goal difference; 4) number of goals scored.

==== Group 4 ====
Pos	Team	Pld	W	D	L	GF	GA	GD	Pts	Qualification or relegation
1	São José de Porto Alegre	6	4	2	0	10	3	+7	14	Qualified
2	Brasil de Farroupilha	6	1	4	1	6	6	0	7	Relegated
3	Lajeadense	6	0	5	1	4	6	−2	5	Relegated
4	Ypiranga	6	0	3	3	2	7	−5	3	Relegated

Updated to match(es) played on May 23, 1999. Source: RSSSF.com
Rules for classification: 1) points; 2) wins; 3) goal difference; 4) number of goals scored.

=== Quarterfinals ===
Team 1	Agg.	Team 2	1st leg	2nd leg
Veranópolis	4–3	Santa Cruz	1–0	3–3
Avenida	1–4 (a.e.t)	Grêmio	1–0	0–4
São José de Porto Alegre	0–3	Internacional	0–1	0–2
Caxias	1–2	Juventude	1–1	0–1

=== Semifinals ===
Team 1	Series	Team 2	Game 1	Game 2	Game 3
Veranópolis	1–7	Grêmio	0–2	3–3	1-2
Juventude	3–6	Internacional	1–3	2–3	–

=== Finals ===
Team 1	Series	Team 2	Game 1	Game 2	Game 3
Internacional	3–6	Grêmio	1–0	0–2	0-1

13 June 1999
Finals

Internacional	1 – 0	Grêmio
Gonçalves 57'

Beira-Rio, Porto Alegre
Attendance: 8,250
Referee: Leonardo Gaciba
16 June 1999
Finals

Grêmio	2 – 0	Internacional
Ronaldinho Gaúcho 60'; Agnaldo 69'	Report

Olímpico, Porto Alegre
Attendance: 23,415
Referee: Carlos Eugênio Simon
20 June 1999
Finals

Grêmio	1 – 0	Internacional
Ronaldinho Gaúcho 44'

Olímpico, Porto Alegre
Attendance: 34,655
Referee: Carlos Eugênio Simon
