= Badico =

Brazilian footballer (born 1968)

Personal information
- Full name: Rinaldo Lopes Costa
- Date of birth: 31 July 1968 (age 58)
- Place of birth: Bagé, Brazil
- Height: 1.72 m (5 ft 8 in)
- Position: Striker

Team information
- Current team: São Paulo-RS (manager)

Senior career*
Years	Team	Apps	(Gls)
1986	Grêmio Bagé		
1987	Riograndense		
1988	Grêmio Bagé		
1988–1989	Cruzeiro de Santiago		
1990	Internacional		
1991	Ypiranga-RS		
1992	São Paulo-RS		
1993	São José-SP		
1993	Brasil de Pelotas		
1994	São Luiz-RS		
1995	Pelotas		
1995	Millonarios		
1996	Brasil de Pelotas		
1996	Grêmio Bagé		
1997	Farroupilha		
1997	Villa Nova		
1998	Inter de Santa Maria		
1998	São José-RS		
1999	Villa Nova		
1999	Guarani		
1999	Joinville		
2000	Santo Ângelo		
2000	Juventude-MT		
2000	Palmeirense		
2000	ABC		
2001	Cachoeira		

Managerial career
- 2016–2017: Esportivo
- 2017–2018: São Gabriel
- 2018: Guarany de Bagé
- 2019: São Paulo-RS
- 2019: Grêmio Bagé
- 2020: Villa Nova
- 2021–2022: Guarany de Bagé
- 2022–: São Paulo-RS
- * Club domestic league appearances and goals

Rinaldo Lopes Costa (born 31 July 1968), commonly known as Badico, is a Brazilian football manager and former player who played as a striker. He is the current manager of São Paulo-RS.

He was a top scorer of Campeonato Gaúcho in 1998 when he played for Esporte Clube Internacional.
