= Leandrão (footballer) =

Brazilian footballer (born 1983)

Personal information
- Full name: Leandro Costa Miranda Moraes
- Date of birth: 18 July 1983 (age 43)
- Place of birth: Uberlândia, Brazil
- Height: 1.89 m (6 ft 2 in)
- Position: Striker

Team information
- Current team: America (manager)

Youth career
- 2000–2001: Internacional

Senior career*
Years	Team	Apps	(Gls)
2001–2002	Internacional		
2003	Botafogo		
2004	Vissel Kobe		
2005	Internacional		
2005	Daejeon Citizen		
2006	Ulsan Hyundai		
2007	Chunnam Dragons		
2008–2010	Internacional		
2009	→ Vitória (loan)		
2010	→ Sport (loan)		
2010–2011	ABC		
2012	Ponte Preta		
2012	São Caetano		
2013	Rio Branco		
2013	Hapoel Acre		
2014	Remo		
2015	Novo Hamburgo		
2015	Brasil de Pelotas		
2015–2017	Vasco da Gama		
2016	→ Boavista (loan)		
2017–2018	Boavista		
2018–2019	ABC		
2019	Boavista		

Managerial career
- 2021–2023: Boavista
- 2025–: America
- * Club domestic league appearances and goals

Leandro Costa Miranda Moraes or simply Leandrão (born 18 July 1983) is a Brazilian professional football manager and former player who is the current head coach of America.

== Club statistics ==
Club performance			League	
Season	Club	League	Apps	Goals
Brazil			League	
2001	Internacional	Série A	8	2
2002	Internacional	Série A	14	2
2003	Botafogo	Série B	30	12
Japan			League	
2004	Vissel Kobe	J1 League	11	2
Korea Republic			League	
2005	Daejeon Citizen	K-League	19	7
2006	Ulsan Hyundai Horang-i	K-League	33	6
2007	Chunnam Dragons	K-League	12	0
Brazil			League	
2008	Internacional	Série A	0	0
2009	Internacional	Série A	6	1
2009	Vitória	Série A	9	2
2010	Sport Recife	Série A	2	0
2010	ABC	Série C	6	3
2011	ABC	Série B	29	11
2012	São Caetano	Série B	31	6
Israel			League	
2013/14	Hapoel Acre	Israeli Premier League	1	0
Country	Brazil		105	27
Country	Japan		11	2
Country	Korea Republic		64	13
Country	Israel		1	0
Total			181	42

== Honours ==
Internacional

- Campeonato Gaúcho: 2002, 2005, 2008, 2009

Sport

- Campeonato Pernambucano: 2010

ABC

- Campeonato Brasileiro Série C: 2010
- Campeonato Potiguar: 2011

Remo

- Campeonato Paraense: 2014

Boavista

- Copa Rio: 2017
