= Leandro Machado =

Leandro Machado may refer to:

- Leandro Machado (footballer, born 1976), Brazilian footballer
- Leandro Machado (football manager) (born 1963), Brazilian football manager
- Leandro Ruiz Machado (born 1977), Brazilian water polo player
