= Leandro Machado (football manager) =

Brazilian football manager (born 1963)

Personal information
- Full name: Leandro Altair Machado
- Date of birth: July 15, 1963 (age 63)
- Place of birth: Sapiranga, Brazil

Managerial career
- Years: Team
- 2003: Tokyo Verdy
- 2005: Ulbra
- 2006: 15 de Novembro
- 2007: América Mineiro
- 2007: Caxias
- 2008: Criciúma
- 2008: Náutico
- 2008: Chapecoense
- 2009: Criciúma
- 2010: Esportivo
- 2010: Joinville
- 2011: Veranópolis
- 2011: Esportivo
- 2012: Santo Ângelo
- 2012: Brasil de Farroupilha
- 2013: São Luiz
- 2014: Campinense
- 2013: São Luiz
- 2016: Aimoré

Leandro Altair Machado known as Leandro Machado (born July 15, 1963) is a Brazilian football manager.

== Tokyo Verdy ==
In 2003, Leandro signed with J1 League club Tokyo Verdy and served as a coach under manager Lori Sandri. In May, Lori Sandri was sacked after the match Verdy lost 7–2 to Júbilo Iwata on May 5. So, Leandro managed the club as caretaker from next match on May 10. He managed three matches until Verdy signed with new manager Osvaldo Ardiles in June. He left Verdy in August.

== Managerial statistics ==
Team	From	To	Record				
Team	From	To	G	W	D	L	Win %
Tokyo Verdy	2003	2003	3	2	0	1	66.67
Total			3	2	0	1	66.67
