= Nilmar =

Brazilian footballer (born 1984)

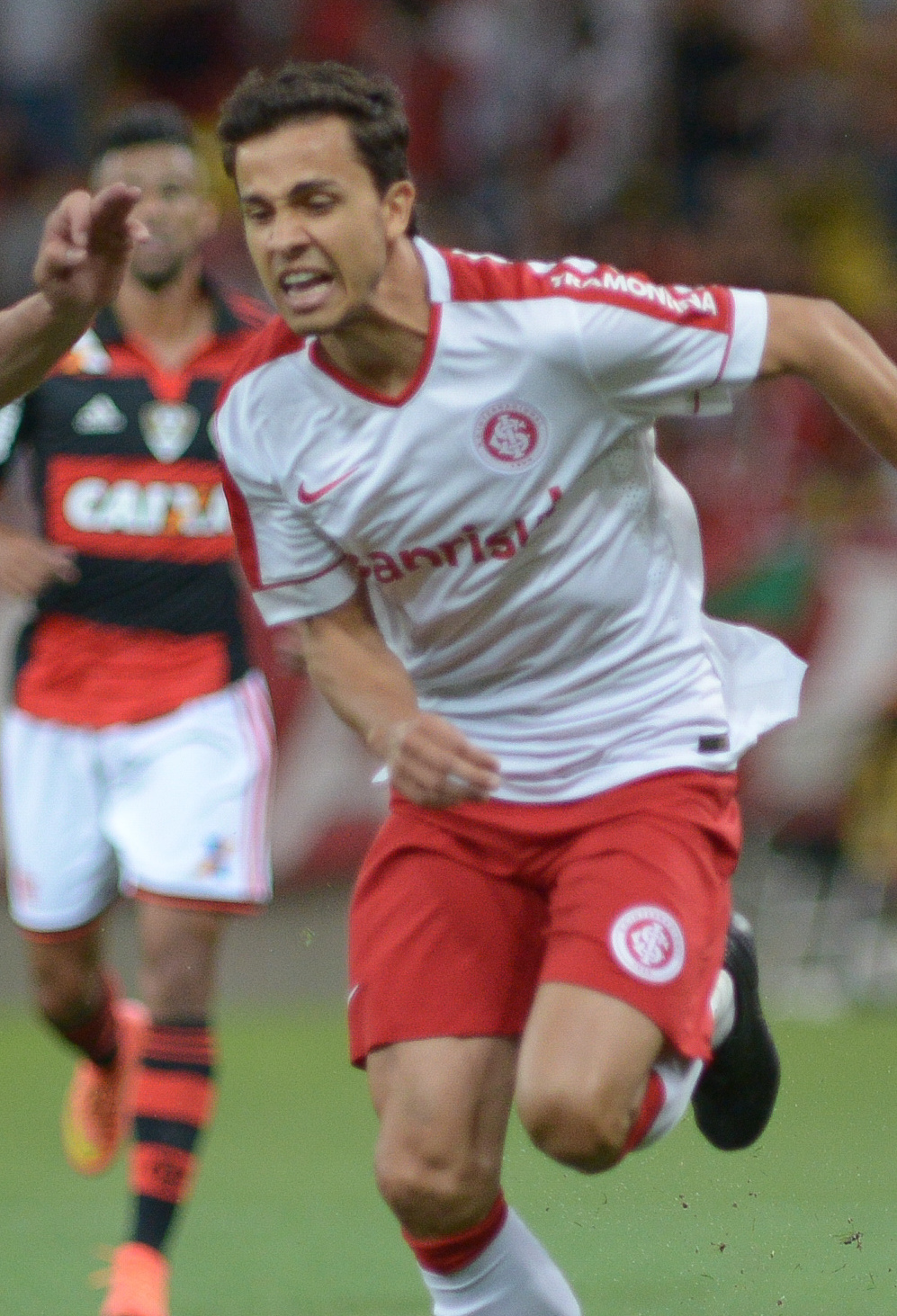
- Nilmar playing for Internacional in 2014

Personal information
- Full name: Nilmar Honorato da Silva
- Date of birth: 14 July 1984 (age 42)
- Place of birth: Bandeirantes, Paraná, Brazil
- Height: 1.80 m (5 ft 11 in)
- Position: Striker

Youth career
- 1999–2002: Internacional

Senior career*
| Years | Team | Apps | (Gls) |
| 2002–2004 | Internacional | 42 | (16) |
| 2004–2005 | Lyon | 32 | (2) |
| 2005–2006 | → Corinthians | 28 | (7) |
| 2006–2007 | Corinthians | 3 | (0) |
| 2007–2009 | Internacional | 36 | (19) |
| 2009–2012 | Villarreal | 85 | (26) |
| 2012–2014 | Al Rayyan | 35 | (16) |
| 2014 | El Jaish | 3 | (2) |
| 2014–2015 | Internacional | 15 | (5) |
| 2015–2017 | Al-Nasr | 26 | (11) |
| 2017 | Santos | 2 | (0) |
| Total | | 307 | (104) |

International career
| 2004 | Brazil U23 | 7 | (0) |
| 2003–2011 | Brazil | 24 | (9) |
- * Club domestic league appearances and goals

Nilmar Honorato da Silva (born 14 July 1984), commonly known as Nilmar, is a Brazilian former professional footballer who played as a striker. Recognized for his exceptional pace, agility, and technical dribbling skills, he was a forward whose career was frequently interrupted by recurring knee injuries.

Nilmar began his career at Internacional, where he became a regular goalscorer and won several honours, including the Copa Sudamericana. His club career spanned multiple countries; he won the Campeonato Brasileiro Série A with Corinthians, claimed the Ligue 1 title during a stint with French side Lyon, and enjoyed a successful spell in Spain's La Liga with Villarreal. In his later years, he had several short spells in the Middle East before officially retiring.

At international level, Nilmar earned 24 caps and scored 9 goals for the Brazil national football team following his debut in 2003. He was a member of the squad that won the 2009 FIFA Confederations Cup and represented his country at the 2010 FIFA World Cup.

== Club career ==
=== Internacional ===
After coming through the youth ranks of Internacional, Nilmar was promoted to the first team in 2002 and appeared regularly.

=== Lyon ===
Nilmar was signed by Lyon in the summer of 2004, initially as cover for fellow Brazilian forward Giovane Élber. He signed with a clause in his contract that stated that he could be loaned back to Internacional once Élber was fit.

Nilmar made an impressive start during his stint at Lyon, scoring two debut goals as a substitute against Rennes. He did not score any more goals in the Ligue 1 that season.

=== Corinthians ===
With the impending signing of Fred, Lyon chose to loan Nilmar out, this time to Corinthians in his native Brazil. They were somewhat forced to do this in order to stay within the limit of non-EU players.

As well as this law, Lyon already had four established forwards, namely Fred, Sylvain Wiltord, Milan Baroš, and Sidney Govou, and, despite his good performances with Corinthians, Nilmar was ultimately sold to the South American club, for €10 million. At Corinthians, the young striker hit the target on his debut against São Paulo FC, with almost his first touch of the ball and he continued to impress fans and critics alike throughout his first season. His skill, speed, and mazy dribbles helped win him a place in the Brazilian League all-star team for the 2005 season.

=== Return to Internacional ===
On 17 August 2007, the Justiça do Trabalho (literally "court of employment") cancelled Nilmar's contract because Corinthians and third-party owner MSI owed the player €2 million. Nilmar was consequently available to sign for any club for free, while Corinthians must still pay the transfer debt of €8million they owed to Lyon for Nilmar's original transfer in 2006. Eventually Corinthians agreed to pay Lyon €6.5 million for the overdue portion of the transfer debt in December 2007. after losing the case in the Court of Arbitration for Sport and FIFA Players' Status Committee.

In the following month, Nilmar returned to Internacional for undisclosed fee to Corinthians and third-party owners., despite the interest of several major clubs in Europe and Brazil. It was reported that Inter partnered with D.I.S. to sign 50% economic rights for €3 million. Internacional had sold 20% economic rights for R$5.46 million to unknown parties in 2007. He made his new debut for the Porto Alegre team on 4 November 2007, when Inter beat CR Vasco da Gama 2–1. He was chosen as the Man of the Match.

In January 2008, he scored an impressive goal against Internazionale of Italy in the Dubai Cup final, which helped his side win the game. In the summer of 2008, Palermo offered €15 million, with a bonus of up to €3 million. This was rejected, however, and activated the clause that Internacional bought 20% economic rights from Nilmar for reported €2.4 million, with other parties retained 50% economic rights.

In December 2008, he scored the winning goal in the Copa Sudamericana final match, giving Internacional the title. It was the first time that the Copa Sudamericana was won by a Brazilian club.

=== Villarreal ===
In July 2009, Nilmar returned to Europe, signing for Spain's Villarreal CF for an estimated €10 million fee. He built up a prolific strike partnership with Italy international Giuseppe Rossi, which he likened to his title-winning alliance with Carlos Tevez at Corinthians.

On 17 September 2009, Nilmar scored the winning goal in the Europa League group stage clash against Bulgarian side Levski Sofia.

On 10 March 2011, he netted twice (including a last-minute goal) to help his team to a 3–2 away win against German club Bayer Leverkusen in the first leg of a last 16-round match of the Europa League. He again netted twice against Twente which his side won 5–1 at home.

=== Al Rayyan ===
On 15 July 2012, Qatar Stars League side Al Rayyan announced that they signed Nilmar on a four-year deal, ahead of undergoing a medical.

He was loaned to Lekhwiya for one game on 31 December so that he could take part in the club's friendly match against PSG on 2 January 2013. He was selected as a cover for Sebastián Soria who was training with the Qatar national team for the upcoming Asian Cup.

On 6 August 2013, he declared to Arabic news network Al Jazeera that he was looking to terminate his loan at Lekhwiya and return to Al Rayyan following a training ground bust up with Lekhwiya first team coach Oliver Rumbold.

=== El Jaish, second return to Internacional ===
On 24 January 2014, Nilmar signed for El Jaish. On 16 September, already as a free agent, he returned to Internacional for a third spell, signing until December 2017.

=== Al-Nasr ===
On 30 July 2015, Nilmar moved to Al-Nasr for two seasons. After scoring 11 league goals in his first season, he was separated from the first team.

=== Santos ===
On 10 July 2017, Nilmar signed a contract with Santos until December 2018, after being released by Al-Nasr. In September, after just 39 minutes of action in two appearances, his contract was suspended with the player alleging "personal reasons"; it was later revealed that he was suffering with depression.

On 13 December 2017, Nilmar cut ties with Santos, after appearing in just two matches.

== International career ==
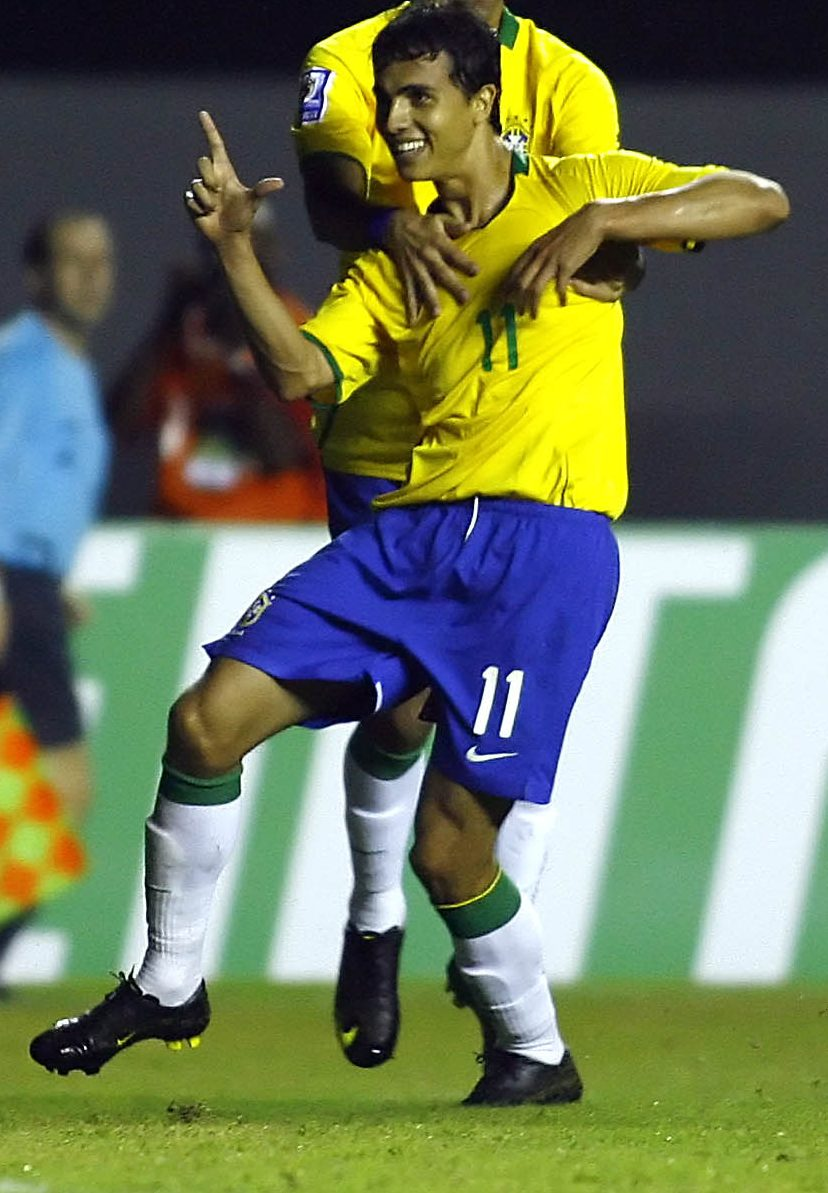
Nilmar playing for Brazil in 2009

Nilmar made his international debut for Brazil in 2003 CONCACAF Gold Cup match against Mexico on 13 July 2003. He appeared three times in the tournament as Brazil was defeated by Mexico in the final. Although Brazil chose to send Brazil under-23 team to the tournament, all the international appearances in the tournament are recognized by FIFA as full international caps. His first international goal came against Haiti on 18 August 2004, as Brazil won 6–0.

After four years out of the national team, on 29 August 2008, Nilmar was recalled by coach Dunga as a replacement for the injured Rafael Sóbis for World Cup qualifiers against Chile and Bolivia. On 21 May 2009, he was selected in Brazil squad for the 2009 FIFA Confederations Cup in South Africa. He made one substitute appearance in the tournament as Brazil went on to win the competition.

On 9 September 2009, he scored a hat-trick for Brazil in a 4–2 win against Chile. On 14 November 2009, Nilmar scored the only goal of the match with a header in a friendly against England. He then scored again in a second friendly match on 17 November 2009 against Oman. He was a member of the Brazil squad that took part at the 2010 FIFA World Cup, hosted by South Africa, appearing as a substitute. He scored Brazil's third goal in a friendly match on 7 October 2010 against Iran.

== Personal life ==
Nilmar is married to Laura Guimarães.

== Career statistics ==
=== Club ===
As of 28 August 2017

Appearances and goals by club, season and competition
| Club | Season | League | | | National cup | | Continental | | State League | | Other | | Total | |
| Club | Season | Division | Apps | Goals | Apps | Goals | Apps | Goals | Apps | Goals | Apps | Goals | Apps | Goals |
|---|---|---|---|---|---|---|---|---|---|---|---|---|---|---|
| Internacional | 2003 | Série A | 28 | 10 | 3 | 0 | 2 (Note: Appearance(s) in Copa Sudamericana) | 0 | 10 | 2 | — | | 43 | 12 |
| Internacional | 2004 | Série A | 14 | 6 | 3 | 1 | 1 | 0 | 12 | 5 | — | | 30 | 12 |
| Internacional | Total | | 42 | 16 | 6 | 1 | 3 | 0 | 22 | 7 | — | | 73 | 24 |
| Lyon | 2004–05 | Ligue 1 | 32 | 2 | 0 | 0 | 9 (Note: Appearance(s) in UEFA Champions League) | 4 | — | | 1 (Note: Appearance(s) in Coupe de la Ligue) | 0 | 42 | 6 |
| Lyon | 2005–06 | Ligue 1 | 0 | 0 | 0 | 0 | 0 | 0 | — | | 1 (Note: Appearance(s) in Trophée des Champions) | 0 | 1 | 0 |
| Lyon | Total | | 32 | 2 | 0 | 0 | 9 | 4 | — | | 2 | 0 | 43 | 6 |
| Corinthians | 2005 | Série A | 20 | 6 | — | | — | | — | | — | | 20 | 6 |
| Corinthians | 2006 | Série A | 11 | 1 | — | | 8 (Note: Appearance(s) in Copa Libertadores) | 5 | 1 | 0 | — | | 24 | 6 |
| Corinthians | 2007 | Série A | 0 | 0 | 2 | 0 | — | | 1 | 0 | — | | 3 | 0 |
| Corinthians | Total | | 31 | 7 | 2 | 0 | 8 | 5 | 2 | 0 | — | | 47 | 12 |
| Internacional | 2007 | Série A | 2 | 0 | — | | — | | — | | — | | 2 | 0 |
| Internacional | 2008 | Série A | 27 | 14 | 0 | 0 | 7 | 5 | 8 | 1 | — | | 42 | 20 |
| Internacional | 2009 | Série A | 7 | 5 | 6 | 1 | — | | 16 | 13 | 1 (Note: Appearance(s) in Recopa Sudamericana) | 0 | 30 | 19 |
| Internacional | Total | | 36 | 19 | 6 | 1 | 7 | 5 | 24 | 14 | 1 | 0 | 74 | 39 |
| Villarreal | 2009–10 | La Liga | 33 | 11 | 2 | 0 | 9 (Note: Appearance(s) in UEFA Europa League) | 1 | — | | — | | 44 | 12 |
| Villarreal | 2010–11 | La Liga | 31 | 11 | 1 | 0 | 12 | 7 | — | | — | | 44 | 18 |
| Villarreal | 2011–12 | La Liga | 21 | 4 | 2 | 0 | 5 | 0 | — | | — | | 28 | 4 |
| Villarreal | Total | | 85 | 26 | 5 | 0 | 26 | 8 | — | | — | | 116 | 34 |
| Al Rayyan | 2012–13 | Qatar Stars League | 20 | 14 | — | | 6 (Note: Appearance(s) in AFC Champions League) | 3 | — | | — | | 26 | 17 |
| Al Rayyan | 2013–14 | Qatar Stars League | 15 | 2 | 1 | 0 | — | | — | | — | | 16 | 2 |
| Al Rayyan | Total | | 35 | 16 | 1 | 0 | 6 | 3 | — | | — | | 42 | 19 |
| El Jaish | 2013–14 | Qatar Stars League | 3 | 2 | 1 | 0 | 8 | 6 | — | | — | | 12 | 8 |
| Internacional | 2014 | Série A | 8 | 2 | — | | — | | — | | — | | 8 | 2 |
| Internacional | 2015 | Série A | 7 | 3 | — | | 8 | 3 | 10 | 1 | — | | 25 | 7 |
| Internacional | Total | | 15 | 5 | — | | 8 | 3 | 10 | 1 | — | | 33 | 9 |
| Al-Nasr | 2015–16 | UAE Pro League | 26 | 11 | 0 | 0 | 6 | 3 | — | | 6 (Note: One appearance in UAE Super Cup, five appearances and two goals in UAE League Cup) | 2 | 38 | 16 |
| Al-Nasr | 2016–17 | UAE Pro League | 0 | 0 | 0 | 0 | — | | — | | — | | 0 | 0 |
| Al-Nasr | Total | | 26 | 11 | 0 | 0 | 6 | 3 | — | | 6 | 2 | 38 | 16 |
| Santos | 2017 | Série A | 2 | 0 | 0 | 0 | 0 | 0 | — | | — | | 2 | 0 |
| Career total | | | 307 | 104 | 21 | 2 | 81 | 37 | 58 | 22 | 9 | 2 | 476 | 167 |

=== International ===
Appearances and goals by national team and year
| National team | Year | Apps | Goals |
|---|---|---|---|
| Brazil | 2003 | 4 | 0 |
| Brazil | 2008 | 1 | 0 |
| Brazil | 2009 | 8 | 7 |
| Brazil | 2010 | 9 | 1 |
| Brazil | 2011 | 1 | 0 |
| Total | | 23 | 8 |

Scores and results list Brazil's goal tally first, score column indicates score after each Nilmar goal.

List of international goals scored by Nilmar
| No. | Date | Venue | Opponent | Score | Result | Competition |
|---|---|---|---|---|---|---|
| 1 | 10 June 2009 | Estádio do Arruda, Recife, Brazil | Paraguay | 2–1 | 2–1 | 2010 FIFA World Cup qualification |
| 2 | 9 September 2009 | Estádio de Pituaçu, Salvador, Brazil | Chile | 1–0 | 4–2 | 2010 FIFA World Cup qualification |
| 3 | 9 September 2009 | Estádio de Pituaçu, Salvador, Brazil | Chile | 3–2 | 4–2 | 2010 FIFA World Cup qualification |
| 4 | 9 September 2009 | Estádio de Pituaçu, Salvador, Brazil | Chile | 4–2 | 4–2 | 2010 FIFA World Cup qualification |
| 5 | 11 October 2009 | Estadio Hernando Siles, La Paz, Bolivia | Bolivia | 1–2 | 1–2 | 2010 FIFA World Cup qualification |
| 6 | 14 November 2009 | Sheikh Khalifa International Stadium, Al Ain, United Arab Emirates | England | 1–0 | 1–0 | Friendly |
| 7 | 17 November 2009 | Sultan Qaboos Sports Complex, Muscat, Oman | Oman | 1–0 | 2–0 | Friendly |
| 8 | 7 October 2010 | Zayed Sports City Stadium, Abu Dhabi, United Arab Emirates | Iran | 3–0 | 3–0 | Friendly |

== Honours ==
Internacional

- Campeonato Gaúcho: 2003, 2004, 2008, 2009, 2015
- Copa Sudamericana: 2008

Lyon

- Ligue 1: 2004–05
- Trophée des Champions: 2005

Corinthians

- Campeonato Brasileiro Série A: 2005

Al-Rayyan

- Qatar Emir Cup: 2013
- Qatari Super Cup: 2012

Brazil U20

- FIFA World Youth Championship: 2003

Brazil

- FIFA Confederations Cup: 2009

Individual

- Copa Libertadores top scorer: 2006
- Campeonato Paulista top scorer: 2006
- Copa Sudamericana top scorer: 2008
- South American Team of the Year: 2008
- Bola de Prata: 2008
