= Thiago (footballer, born February 1983) =

Brazilian footballer

Personal information
- Full name: Thiago dos Santos Costa
- Date of birth: February 28, 1983 (age 43)
- Place of birth: Brazil
- Height: 1.82 m (5 ft 11 1/2 in)
- Position: Defender

Team information
- Current team: São Luiz

Senior career*
Years	Team	Apps	(Gls)
2009	Ehime FC		
- * Club domestic league appearances and goals

Thiago dos Santos Costa (born February 28, 1983) is a Brazilian footballer who plays for São Luiz.

== Club statistics ==
Club performance			League		Cup		Total	
Season	Club	League	Apps	Goals	Apps	Goals	Apps	Goals
Japan			League		Emperor's Cup		Total	
2009	Ehime FC	J2 League	13	0	0	0	13	0
Country	Japan		13	0	0	0	13	0
Total			13	0	0	0	13	0
