= Ramon Costa =

Brazilian footballer (1987–2018)

- Costa with Figueirense FC

Personal information
- Full name: Ramon Neto da Costa
- Date of birth: 16 February 1987
- Place of birth: Araranguá, Brazil
- Date of death: 6 October 2018 (aged 31)
- Place of death: Araranguá, Brazil
- Height: 1.77 m (5 ft 10 in)
- Position: Striker

Youth career
- 2006–2007: Figueirense

Senior career*
Years	Team	Apps	(Gls)
2007–2009	Figueirense	8	(2)
2009	Politehnica Iași	0	(0)
2009–2011	Juventus Jaraguá	4	(2)
2011–2014	Brasil de Farroupilha	0	(0)
2014–2015	Penarol	9	(8)
2015–2018	Araranguá		
- * Club domestic league appearances and goals

Ramon Neto da Costa (16 February 1987 – 6 October 2018), better known as simply Ramon Costa, was a Brazilian professional footballer who played as a striker.

== Career ==
Ramon Costa began his career with Figueirense, left the club after two years and joined Romanian club Politehnica Iași which plays in the Liga I. He left the club because the coach did not think he was "prepared enough".

== Death ==
Ramon Costa died on 6 October 2018 due to a sudden cardiac arrest. He was playing with some friends when he suddenly collapsed and was pronounced dead at the hospital.

== See also ==
- List of association footballers who died while playing
