= Ruy Netto =

Brazilian footballer

Personal information
- Full name: Ruy de Valladares Porto Netto
- Date of birth: 2 February 1980 (age 46)
- Place of birth: Rio de Janeiro, Brazil
- Height: 1.69 m (5 ft 6 1/2 in)
- Position: Midfielder

Youth career
- Flamengo

Senior career*
Years	Team	Apps	(Gls)
2002	Flamengo	0	(0)
2002	Albinegros de Orizaba		
2003	Delfines de Coatzacoalcos		
2004	Bangu	0	(0)
2004–2006	Friburguense	0	(0)
2004–2005	→ Paniliakos (loan)		
2005–2006	→ Proodeftiki (loan)		
2007	Cabofriense	0	(0)
2007	Paulista	17	(1)
2008	Madureira	0	(0)
2008	Macaé	2	(0)
2008–2010	Santa Clara	44	(2)
2011	America (RJ)	4	(0)
2011	Hải Phòng F.C.	10	(1)
2013	Esporte Clube São Luiz	6	(0)
2013	Quissamã Futebol Clube	0	(0)
2014	Al-Ahli	1	(0)
- * Club domestic league appearances and goals

Ruy de Valladares Porto Netto (born 2 February 1980) is a Brazilian footballer who plays .

== Biography ==
A youth product of Flamengo, Ruy Netto moved Mexico in 2002. In 2004, he returned to Rio de Janeiro for Bangu AC. He then loaned to Greek side Paniliakos from Friburguense.

In July 2005 his contract with Friburguense was extended to August 2008 and he left for Proodeftiki afterwards. His contract with Friburguense was terminated in 2006 by judicial order. In December 2006 he signed a contract until the end of 2007 Campeonato Carioca. He left for Série B side Paulista in July 2007.

In January 2008 he left for Madureira until the end of 2008 Campeonato Carioca. On 27 June he left for Macaé of Série C, but in July left the club and in August signed by Liga de Honra side Santa Clara. He wore no.10 shirt with the Portuguese side.

On 24 February 2011, Ruy Netto returned to Brazil for a third time, signed a contract with America (RJ) until the end of 2011 Campeonato Carioca.

In May 2011, he moved to Vietnam to play for Hải Phòng F.C.

In April 2014, he joined Al-Ahli for two months at the end of season. He played his first match against Al-Ittihad in semi final of King Cup of Champions. He helped Al-Ahli to win the match. The match was ended 2–1 in the favour of Al-Ahli.
