= Sidnei (footballer, born 1989) =

Brazilian footballer

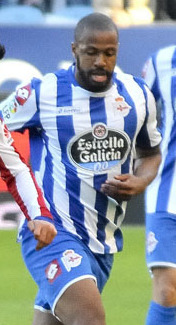
- Sidnei with Deportivo in 2015

Personal information
- Full name: Sidnei Rechel da Silva Júnior
- Date of birth: 23 August 1989 (age 37)
- Place of birth: Alegrete, Brazil
- Height: 1.85 m (6 ft 1 in)
- Position: Centre-back

Youth career
- 2003–2006: Internacional

Senior career*
Years	Team	Apps	(Gls)
2007–2008	Internacional	35	(1)
2008–2016	Benfica	45	(6)
2011–2012	→ Beşiktaş (loan)	10	(2)
2012–2013	Benfica B	21	(0)
2013–2014	→ Espanyol (loan)	12	(0)
2014–2016	→ Deportivo La Coruña (loan)	65	(0)
2016–2018	Deportivo La Coruña	50	(2)
2018–2021	Betis	49	(2)
2022	Cruzeiro	2	(0)
2022	Goiás	4	(0)
2022–2023	Las Palmas	19	(1)
2023	Ceará	2	(0)

International career
2005	Brazil U17	5	(0)
- * Club domestic league appearances and goals as of 18:07, 22 December 2023 (UTC)

Sidnei Rechel da Silva Júnior (born 23 August 1989), known simply as Sidnei, is a Brazilian professional footballer who plays as a centre-back.

== Club career ==
=== Internacional ===
Born in Alegrete, Rio Grande do Sul, Sidnei started playing professionally with SC Internacional, being part of the side that conquered the 2007 edition of the Recopa Sudamericana. On 24 July 2008 he signed a five-year contract with S.L. Benfica, who paid €5 million for 50% of his sporting rights.

=== Benfica ===
Sidnei was used intermittently during his first season in Portugal, but still managed to appear in 24 Primeira Liga games and score three goals in as many wins, including the 2–0 derby home win against Sporting CP on 27 September 2008. In November, Benfica bought another 50% of his rights for €2 million, and GestiFute acquired the rights to receive 30% from any future transfer. He played only five league matches the following campaign – ten competitive appearances – as the club won the national championship after a five-year wait.

After spending the first half of 2010–11 on the bench, Sidnei was propelled to the starting XI after David Luiz moved to Chelsea in the winter transfer window. On 21 February 2011, he was sent off in a league game at Sporting but his team still managed to win it 2–0 and, later the following month, he renewed his contract for a further three seasons until 2016; however, due to poor performances, he lost his starting place to Jardel.

In early June 2011, Beşiktaş J.K. agreed with Benfica on a one-year loan, with the option to make the move permanent. On 19 September he scored a brace for the first in his career, helping to a 3–1 Süper Lig home victory over MKE Ankaragücü.

As the Turkish club opted against exercising its option, Sidnei returned to Portugal and found himself demoted to the B team. On 29 July 2013, he and Pizzi were loaned to La Liga's RCD Espanyol on a one-year deal.

=== Deportivo ===
On 1 September 2014, Sidnei moved to fellow league side Deportivo de La Coruña also on loan. After making 32 appearances to help his team avoid relegation, his loan was extended for a further year.

Sidnei had a contract running until 2018, with the Galicians sharing his rights with Benfica and GestiFute. He scored his first goal in the Spanish top division on 5 December 2016, helping the hosts rout Real Sociedad 5–1.

On 19 July 2018, Deportivo announced they had reached an agreement with FC Krasnodar over the transfer of Sidnei. The deal was called off two days later, however, with the player having been unable to agree terms.

=== Betis ===
In August 2018, Sidnei joined Real Betis also from the Spanish top flight on a four-year contract. On 31 August 2021, after 64 official matches, the 32-year-old terminated his contract with the club.

=== Cruzeiro and Goiás ===
On 13 December 2021, Sidnei returned to his home country after nearly 14 years, signing for Cruzeiro Esporte Clube. The following 25 March he terminated his contract and joined Goiás Esporte Clube, but also left the latter on 5 July having totalled just seven appearances for both sides.

=== Las Palmas ===
Sidnei returned to Spain in July 2022, agreeing to a one-year deal at second-tier UD Las Palmas.

== Career statistics ==
As of 6 July 2022

Appearances and goals by club, season and competition
Club	Season	League			State League		National Cup		League Cup		Continental		Others		Total	
Club	Season	Division	Apps	Goals	Apps	Goals	Apps	Goals	Apps	Goals	Apps	Goals	Apps	Goals	Apps	Goals
Internacional	2007	Série A	21	0	0	0	0	0	—		—		2 (Note: Appearances in Recopa Sudamericana)	0	23	0
Internacional	2008	Série A	4	1	10 (Note: Appearances in Campeonato Gaúcho)	0	2	1	—		—		—		16	2
Internacional	Total		25	1	10	0	2	1	—		—		2	0	39	2
Benfica	2008–09	Primeira Liga	24	3	—		3	0	2	1	6 (Note: Appearances in UEFA Europa League)	0	—		35	4
Benfica	2009–10	Primeira Liga	5	0	—		2	0	0	0	3	0	—		10	0
Benfica	2010–11	Primeira Liga	16	3	—		2	0	4	1	4	0	1 (Note: Appearance in Supertaça Cândido de Oliveira)	0	27	3
Benfica	2012–13	Primeira Liga	0	0	—		0	0	1	0	0	0	—		1	0
Benfica	Total		45	6	—		7	0	7	2	13	0	1	0	73	7
Beşiktaş	2011–12	Süper Lig	10	2	—		1	0	—		1	0	—		12	2
Benfica B	2012–13	Segunda Liga	21	0	—		—		—		—		—		21	0
Espanyol	2013–14	La Liga	12	0	—		6	1	—		—		—		18	1
Deportivo	2014–15	La Liga	32	0	—		0	0	—		—		—		32	0
Deportivo	2015–16	La Liga	33	0	—		0	0	—		—		—		33	0
Deportivo	2016–17	La Liga	29	1	—		3	0	—		—		—		32	1
Deportivo	2017–18	La Liga	21	1	—		1	0	—		—		—		22	1
Deportivo	Total		115	2	—		4	0	—		—		—		119	2
Betis	2018–19	La Liga	24	1	—		3	0	—		7	1	—		34	2
Betis	2019–20	La Liga	14	1	—		1	0	—		—		—		15	1
Betis	2020–21	La Liga	11	0	—		4	0	—		—		—		15	0
Betis	2021–22	La Liga	0	0	—		0	0	—		0	0	—		0	0
Betis	Total		49	2	—		8	0	—		7	1	—		64	3
Cruzeiro	2022	Série B	0	0	2 (Note: Appearances in Campeonato Mineiro)	0	0	0	—		—		—		2	0
Goiás	2022	Série A	4	0	—		1	0	—		—		—		5	0
Career total			281	13	12	0	29	2	7	2	21	1	3	0	353	18

== Honours ==
Internacional

- Recopa Sudamericana: 2007
- Campeonato Gaúcho: 2008

Benfica

- Primeira Liga: 2009–10
- Taça da Liga: 2008–09, 2010–11
