= Flávio Dias =

Brazilian footballer (born 1978)

Personal information
- Full name: Flávio Ribeiro Dias
- Date of birth: 12 April 1978 (age 48)
- Place of birth: Santos, Brazil
- Height: 1.81 m (5 ft 11 in)
- Position: Forward

Youth career
- Portuguesa Santista

Senior career*
Years	Team	Apps	(Gls)
1996–1997	Portuguesa Santista		
1998	Santos		
1999	Jabaquara		
2000–2001	Sãocarlense		
2002	Portuguesa Santista		
2003	Pelotas		
2003	Grêmio		
2004	Académica		
2004	Avaí		
2005	15 de Novembro		
2005–2006	Zorya Luhansk		
2007	Pelotas		
2007–2008	Iraklis		
2009	Ypiranga-RS		
2009	Ituano		
2010	Rio Claro		
2010	Ypiranga-RS		
2011	Aluminium Hormozgan		
2011–2012	Marcílio Dias		
2012	Portuguesa Santista		
- * Club domestic league appearances and goals

Flávio Ribeiro Dias (born 12 April 1978), better known as Flávio Dias, is a Brazilian former professional footballer who played as a forward.

== Career ==
Born in Santos, Dias began his career at Portuguesa Santista, in addition to having played for Santos and Jabaquara. In 2003, at EC Pelotas, he was top scorer in the Campeonato Gaúcho with 18 goals, and was later signed by Grêmio. He also played for Académica, Zorya Luhansk, Iraklis among other teams.

== Honours ==
Zorya Luhansk

- Ukrainian First League: 2005–06

Individual

- 2003 Campeonato Gaúcho top scorer: 18 goals
