= 2005 Campeonato Gaúcho =

Campeonato Gaúcho
- Season: 2005
- Champions: Internacional
- Relegated: Guarani-VA; São Gabriel
- Copa do Brasil: Grêmio; 15 de Novembro; Novo Hamburgo (Copa Emílio Perondi champions); Ulbra (Copa FGF runners-up)
- Série C: Glória; Novo Hamburgo (Copa Emílio Perondi champions); Gaúcho (2004 Copa FGF runners-up)
- Matches played: 206
- Goals scored: 556 (2.7 per match)
- Top goalscorer: Felipe (Passo Fundo) – 10 goals
- Biggest home win: Passo Fundo 5-0 Ulbra (February 13, 2005); Novo Hamburgo 5-0 Glória (June 4, 2005)
- Biggest away win: 15 de Novembro 0–4 Novo Hamburgo (May 6, 2005); São Gabriel 0-4 Brasil de Pelotas (May 18, 2005)
- Highest scoring: Veranópolis 4-4 Farroupilha (February 23, 2005)

The 2005 Campeonato Gaúcho kicked off on January 30, 2005 and ended June 12, 2005. The 85th season of the league saw eighteen teams participating, with holders Internacional beating 15 de Novembro in the finals for their 37th title. Guarani de Venâncio Aires and São Gabriel were relegated.

== Participating teams ==
Club	Home location	Previous season
15 de Novembro	Campo Bom	7th
Brasil	Pelotas	1st (Second level)
Caxias	Caxias do Sul	6th
Esportivo	Bento Gonçalves	9th
Farroupilha	Pelotas	2nd (Second level)
Glória	Vacaria	3rd
Grêmio	Porto Alegre	4th
Guarani	Venâncio Aires	16th
Internacional	Porto Alegre	1st
Juventude	Caxias do Sul	5th
Novo Hamburgo	Novo Hamburgo	11th
Passo Fundo	Passo Fundo	10th
São Gabriel	São Gabriel	12th
São José	Cachoeira do Sul	15th
São José	Porto Alegre	13th
Santa Cruz	Santa Cruz do Sul	8th
Ulbra	Canoas	2nd
Veranópolis	Veranópolis	14th

== System ==
The championship would have four stages:

- First stage: The 18 teams were divided into three groups of six teams each. They played against each other inside their groups in a double round-robin system. After 10 rounds, the top two teams of each group, plus the two best third-placed teams qualified to the Semifinals.
- Copa Emílio Perondi: The fourteen teams that didn't participate in the Série A or Série B were divided into 2 groups of seven teams each. They played against each other inside their groups in a double round-robin system. After 14 rounds, the two best teams in each group qualified to the Semifinals, the winners of which would qualify into the Finals, with the winner qualifying to the Série C of that year, and the bottom team in each group being relegated.
- Semifinals: The eight remaining teams were divided in 2 groups of 4 teams each and they played in a double round-robin system. The winner of each group qualified to the Finals.
- Finals: Semifinals group winners played in two matches to define the Champions. The team with best overall record played the second leg at home.

== Championship ==
=== First stage ===
==== Group A ====
Pos	Team	Pld	W	D	L	GF	GA	GD	Pts	Qualification or relegation
1	Glória	10	6	2	2	19	9	+10	20	Qualified to Semifinals
2	Internacional	10	4	3	3	9	6	+3	15	Qualified to Semifinals
3	Veranópolis	10	4	2	4	15	13	+2	14	Qualified to Semifinals
4	Farroupilha	10	3	4	3	16	17	−1	13	
5	Santa Cruz	10	3	3	4	10	15	−5	12	
6	Novo Hamburgo	10	2	2	6	10	19	−9	8	

Updated to match(es) played on March 13, 2005. Source: RSSSF.com
Rules for classification: 1) points; 2) wins; 3) goal difference; 4) number of goals scored.

==== Group B ====
Pos	Team	Pld	W	D	L	GF	GA	GD	Pts	Qualification or relegation
1	Caxias	10	5	3	2	17	9	+8	18	Qualified to Semifinals
2	Brasil de Pelotas	10	5	2	3	16	14	+2	17	Qualified to Semifinals
3	Grêmio	10	4	2	4	16	14	+2	14	Qualified to Semifinals
4	São Gabriel	10	3	3	4	15	19	−4	12	
5	São José de Cachoeira do Sul	10	3	2	5	13	18	−5	11	
6	Guarani de Venâncio Aires	10	2	4	4	9	12	−3	10	

Updated to match(es) played on March 13, 2005. Source: RSSSF.com
Rules for classification: 1) points; 2) wins; 3) goal difference; 4) number of goals scored.

==== Group C ====
Pos	Team	Pld	W	D	L	GF	GA	GD	Pts	Qualification or relegation
1	15 de Novembro	10	9	0	1	26	12	+14	27	Qualified to Semifinals
2	Juventude	10	4	2	4	15	12	+3	14	Qualified to Semifinals
3	Passo Fundo	10	3	3	4	17	17	0	12	
4	Ulbra	10	3	3	4	14	18	−4	12	
5	Esportivo	10	2	4	4	13	15	−2	10	
6	São José de Porto Alegre	10	2	2	6	9	20	−11	8	

Updated to match(es) played on March 13, 2005. Source: RSSSF.com
Rules for classification: 1) points; 2) wins; 3) goal difference; 4) number of goals scored.

=== Copa Emílio Perondi ===
==== Group 1 ====
Pos	Team	Pld	W	D	L	GF	GA	GD	Pts	Qualification or relegation
1	Novo Hamburgo	12	7	2	3	20	9	+11	23	Qualified
2	Brasil de Pelotas	12	6	4	2	20	11	+9	22	Qualified
3	Esportivo	12	5	4	3	17	13	+4	19	
4	Ulbra	12	4	5	3	19	14	+5	17	
5	15 de Novembro	12	3	6	3	13	15	−2	15	
6	Passo Fundo	12	3	1	8	10	20	−10	10	
7	São Gabriel	12	2	2	8	10	27	−17	8	Relegated

Updated to match(es) played on May 29, 2005. Source: RSSSF.com
Rules for classification: 1) points; 2) wins; 3) goal difference; 4) number of goals scored.

==== Group 2 ====
Pos	Team	Pld	W	D	L	GF	GA	GD	Pts	Qualification or relegation
1	São José de Porto Alegre	12	6	4	2	18	11	+7	22	Qualified
2	Glória	12	6	2	4	21	17	+4	20	Qualified
3	Veranópolis	12	5	1	6	17	16	+1	16	
4	Farroupilha	12	4	4	4	15	16	−1	16	
5	Santa Cruz	12	4	3	5	17	19	−2	15	
6	São José de Cachoeira do Sul	12	4	2	6	14	22	−8	14	
7	Guarani de Venâncio Aires	12	3	4	5	15	16	−1	13	Relegated

Updated to match(es) played on May 29, 2005. Source: RSSSF.com
Rules for classification: 1) points; 2) wins; 3) goal difference; 4) number of goals scored.

==== Semifinals ====
Team 1	Agg.	Team 2	1st leg	2nd leg
Glória	0–6	Novo Hamburgo	0–1	0–5
Brasil de Pelotas	4–0	São José de Porto Alegre	2–0	2–0

==== Finals ====
Team 1	Agg.	Team 2	1st leg	2nd leg
Brasil de Pelotas	1–4	Novo Hamburgo	1–1	0–3

=== Semifinals ===
==== Group D ====
Pos	Team	Pld	W	D	L	GF	GA	GD	Pts	Qualification or relegation
1	15 de Novembro	6	2	4	0	5	3	+2	10	Qualified to Finals
2	Grêmio	6	2	3	1	8	6	+2	9	
3	Caxias	6	2	1	3	6	8	−2	7	
4	Brasil de Pelotas	6	1	2	3	4	6	−2	5	

Updated to match(es) played on April 3, 2005. Source: RSSSF.com
Rules for classification: 1) points; 2) wins; 3) goal difference; 4) number of goals scored.

==== Group E ====
Pos	Team	Pld	W	D	L	GF	GA	GD	Pts	Qualification or relegation
1	Internacional	6	5	0	1	13	6	+7	15	Qualified to Finals
2	Glória	6	3	1	2	9	6	+3	10	
3	Juventude	6	2	1	3	5	4	+1	7	
4	Veranópolis	6	1	0	5	2	13	−11	3	

Updated to match(es) played on April 3, 2005. Source: RSSSF.com
Rules for classification: 1) points; 2) wins; 3) goal difference; 4) number of goals scored.

=== Finals ===
Team 1	Agg.	Team 2	1st leg	2nd leg
Internacional	4–3	15 de Novembro	2–0	2–3

10 April 2005
16:10 (UTC-3)
Finals

Internacional	2 – 0	15 de Novembro
Rafael Sóbis 18'; Tinga 21'

Beira-Rio, Porto Alegre
Attendance: 42,436
Referee: Leandro Vuaden
14 April 2005
21:10 (UTC-3)
Finals

15 de Novembro	3 – 2 (a.e.t.)	Internacional
Julio Rodriguez 67'; Jaques 80'; Luizinho Vieira 109'		Souza 107', 111'

Sady Schmidt, Campo Bom
Attendance: 2,528
Referee: Carlos Eugênio Simon
