= 2013–14 RCD Espanyol season =

RCD Espanyol
2013–14 season
- President: Joan Collet
- Head coach: Javier Aguirre
- Stadium: Cornellà-El Prat
- Primera División: 14th
- Copa del Rey: Quarter-finals
- Top goalscorer: League: Sergio García (13); All: Sergio García (13)
Home colours	Away colours	Third colours

The 2013–14 RCD Espanyol season was the club's 113th season in its history and its 79th in the top-tier.

== Squad ==
As June, 2014..

=== Squad and statistics ===
No.	Pos	Nat	Player	Total		Liga		Copa	
No.	Pos	Nat	Player	Apps	Goals	Apps	Goals	Apps	Goals
1	GK	(Spain) ESP	Germán Parreño	3	0	1	0	2	0
2	DF	(Brazil) BRA	Felipe Mattioni	3	0	2	0	1	0
3	DF	(Spain) ESP	Raúl Rodríguez	24	0	19	0	5	0
4	MF	(Spain) ESP	Víctor Sánchez	37	4	33	4	4	0
5	MF	(Spain) ESP	Sergio Tejera	0	0	0	0	0	0
6	DF	(Brazil) BRA	Sidnei	18	1	12	0	6	1
8	FW	(Uruguay) URU	Cristhian Stuani	38	7	34	6	4	1
9	FW	(Spain) ESP	Sergio García	41	13	37	12	4	1
10	FW	(Portugal) POR	Pizzi	34	4	28	3	6	1
11	DF	(Spain) ESP	Joan Capdevila	10	0	5	0	5	0
12	MF	(Spain) ESP	Manuel Lanzarote	21	1	17	1	4	0
13	GK	(Spain) ESP	Kiko Casilla	41	0	37	0	4	0
14	MF	(Spain) ESP	David López	37	3	33	2	4	1
15	DF	(Mexico) MEX	Héctor Moreno	37	1	32	1	5	0
16	DF	(Spain) ESP	Javi López	35	0	33	0	2	0
17	DF	(Spain) ESP	Víctor Álvarez	9	1	7	0	2	1
18	DF	(Spain) ESP	Juan Fuentes	36	0	35	0	1	0
19	DF	(Argentina) ARG	Diego Colotto	32	4	31	4	1	0
20	MF	(Portugal) POR	Simão	36	2	34	0	2	2
22	MF	(Spain) ESP	Álex Fernández	30	0	24	0	6	0
23	MF	(Spain) ESP	Abraham	26	0	21	0	5	0
24	FW	(Colombia) COL	Jhon Córdoba	33	4	28	4	5	0
25	MF	(Romania) ROU	Gabriel Torje	15	0	12	0	3	0
28	DF	(Spain) ESP	Carlos Clerc	1	0	1	0	0	0

== Competitions ==
=== Overall ===
Competition	Started round	Final position / round	First match	Last match
La Liga	—	14th	19 August 2013	17 May 2014
Copa del Rey	Round of 32	Quarter-finals	8 December 2013	28 January 2014

Updated to match played June 2014
Source: Competitions

=== La Liga ===
==== League table ====
Pos	Team	Pld	W	D	L	GF	GA	GD	Pts
12	Rayo Vallecano	38	13	4	21	46	80	−34	43
13	Getafe	38	11	9	18	35	54	−19	42
14	Espanyol	38	11	9	18	41	51	−10	42
15	Granada	38	12	5	21	32	56	−24	41
16	Elche	38	9	13	16	30	50	−20	40 (Note: Elche finished ahead of Almería on head-to-head points: Elche 1–0 Almería, Almería 2–2 Elche.)

Source: La Liga, ESPN
Rules for classification: 1st points; 2nd head-to-head points;

=== Copa del Rey ===
8 December 2013 Round of 32 first leg	Real Jaén	2–2	Espanyol	Jaén
19:00	Sidnei 64' (o.g.); Jozabed 70'		D. López 44'; Stuani 87'	Stadium: Nuevo Estadio de La Victoria

19 December 2013 Round of 32 second leg	Espanyol	2–0 (4–2 agg.)	Real Jaén	Barcelona
19:30	Simão 16'; Sidnei 85'			Stadium: Cornellà-El Prat; Referee: Carlos Clos Gómez

8 January 2014 Round of 16 first leg	Alcorcón	1–0	Espanyol	Alcorcón
20:00	Pacheco 72'	Report		Stadium: Estadio Municipal de Santo Domingo; Referee: César Muñiz Fernández

15 January 2014 Round of 16 second leg	Espanyol	4–2 (4–3 agg.)	Alcorcón	Barcelona
19:30	Simão 10'; García 23' (pen.); Álvarez 84'; Pizzi 87'	Report	Plano 4'; Javito 80'	Stadium: Cornellà-El Prat; Referee: Miguel Ayza Gámez

21 January 2014 Quarter-finals first leg	Espanyol	0–1	Real Madrid	Barcelona
21:00		Report	Benzema 25'	Stadium: Cornellà-El Prat; Attendance: 30,837; Referee: Carlos Clos Gómez

28 January 2014 Quarter-finals second leg	Real Madrid	1–0 (2–0 agg.)	Espanyol	Madrid
21:00	Jesé 7'	Report		Stadium: Santiago Bernabéu Stadium; Attendance: 54,500; Referee: Fernando Teixeira Vitienes
