= Magrão (footballer, born 1978) =

Brazilian footballer

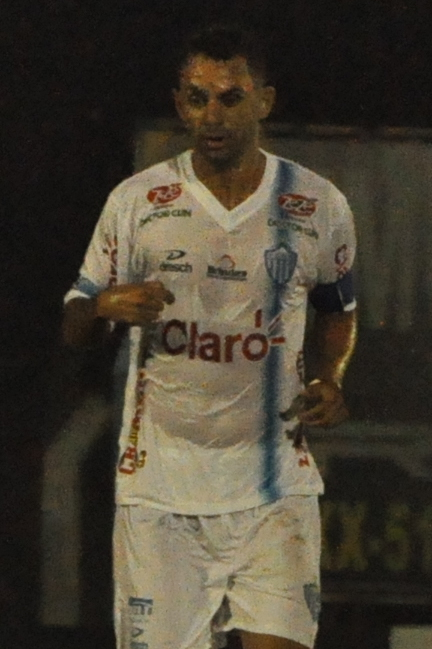
- MagraoNH 2015

Personal information
- Full name: Márcio Rodrigues
- Date of birth: December 20, 1978 (age 47)
- Place of birth: São Paulo, Brazil
- Height: 1.86 m (6 ft 1 in)
- Position: Defensive midfielder

Team information
- Current team: Náutico

Youth career
- 1992–1994: Portuguesa

Senior career*
Years	Team	Apps	(Gls)
1995–1996	São Caetano		
1997–1998	Santo André		
1999–2000	São Caetano		
2000–2005	Palmeiras	108	(9)
2002	→ São Caetano (loan)	23	(5)
2005–2006	Yokohama F. Marinos	30	(7)
2006–2007	→ Corinthians (loan)	15	(2)
2007–2009	Internacional	103	(15)
2009–2012	Al Wahda	27	(2)
2012–2013	Dubai Club	21	(2)
2013	Náutico	2	(0)
2013–	América-MG	0	(0)

International career^{‡}
2004–2005	Brazil	3	(0)
- * Club domestic league appearances and goals as of 23:06, January 3, 2009 (UTC) ‡ National team caps and goals as of 23:06, January 3, 2009 (UTC)

Márcio Rodrigues (born December 20, 1978), better known as Magrão, is a Brazilian former professional footballer.

Magrão is better known as a Palmeiras' player, scoring 29 goals in 232 matches for the club.

== Nickname ==
His nickname Magrão means skinny, and is due to the fact that when he was a kid there was not much food available in his home.

== Early life ==
Born in São João Clímaco neighborhood, São Paulo, his family was very poor, living in Heliópolis favela, in São Paulo. His father earned a minimum wage per month, and his mother worked as a cleaning woman. He suffered of bronchopneumonia and hepatitis.

== Early career ==
He tried to join the youth squad of Palmeiras, but was not approved. In 1992 and in 1993 he was a player of the Portuguesa youth squad. However, he was abandoned by the club, after an injury, before becoming a professional player. He then joined the youth squad of São Caetano, where he became a professional player.

== Club statistics ==
Club performance			League		Cup		League Cup		Total	
Season	Club	League	Apps	Goals	Apps	Goals	Apps	Goals	Apps	Goals
Brazil			League		Copa do Brasil		League Cup		Total	
2000	Palmeiras	Série A	21	2					21	2
2001	Palmeiras	Série A	22	0					22	0
2002	São Caetano	Série A	21	4					21	4
2003	Palmeiras	Série B	25	4					25	4
2004	Palmeiras	Série A	38	3					38	3
2005	Palmeiras	Série A	2	0					2	0
Japan			League		Emperor's Cup		J.League Cup		Total	
2005	Yokohama F. Marinos	J1 League	13	1	2	0	2	0	17	1
2006	Yokohama F. Marinos	J1 League	17	6	0	0	7	1	24	6
Brazil			League		Copa do Brasil		League Cup		Total	
2006	Corinthians Paulista	Série A	12	2					12	2
2007	Corinthians Paulista	Série A	0	0					0	0
2007	Internacional	Série A	19	3					19	3
2008	Internacional	Série A	21	1					21	1
2009	Internacional	Série A	13	2					13	2
United Arab Emirates			League		President's Cup		Etisalat Cup		Total	
2009/10	Al-Wahda	UAE League								
Country	Brazil		194	21					194	21
Country	Japan		30	7	2	0	9	1	41	8
Country	United Arab Emirates		0	0	0	0	0	0	0	0
Total			224	28	2	0	9	1	235	29

== National team statistics ==
Brazil national team
Year	Apps	Goals
2004	2	0
2005	1	0
Total	3	0

== Honors ==
Santo André

- São Paulo State League (3rd division): 1998

São Caetano

- São Paulo State League (2nd division): 1999

Palmeiras

- Brazilian League (2nd division): 2003

Internacional

- Dubai Cup: 2008
- Campeonato Gaúcho: 2008, 2009
- Copa Sudamericana: 2008

Al Wahda

- UAE Pro-League: 2009–10
- UAE Super Cup: 2011

=== Personal honors ===
- Brazilian Bola de Prata (Placar): 2004
