= Lauro (footballer, born 1973) =

Brazilian footballer

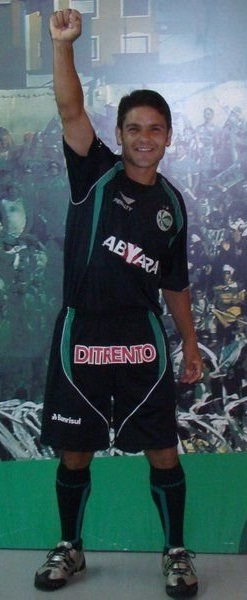
Lauro Antonio Ferreira da Silva

Lauro Antonio Ferreira da Silva (born June 20, 1973 in Alegrete, Rio Grande do Sul), known as just Lauro, is a Brazilian footballer who plays as a Midfielder for Esportivo de Bento Gonçalves.

== Team and clubs ==
- Juventude: 1993 - 1997
- Palmeiras: 1998
- Juventude: 1998 - 2001
- Etti Jundiaí: 2001
- Grêmio: 2002 - 2003
- Palmeiras: 2004
- Ulbra: 2004
- Juventude: 2004 - 2010
- Esportivo: 2010 - current

== Honours ==
- Campeonato Brasileiro Série B: 1994 - Juventude
- Campeonato Gaúcho: 1998 - Juventude
- Copa do Brasil: 1999 - Juventude
