= Índio (footballer, born 1975) =

Brazilian footballer

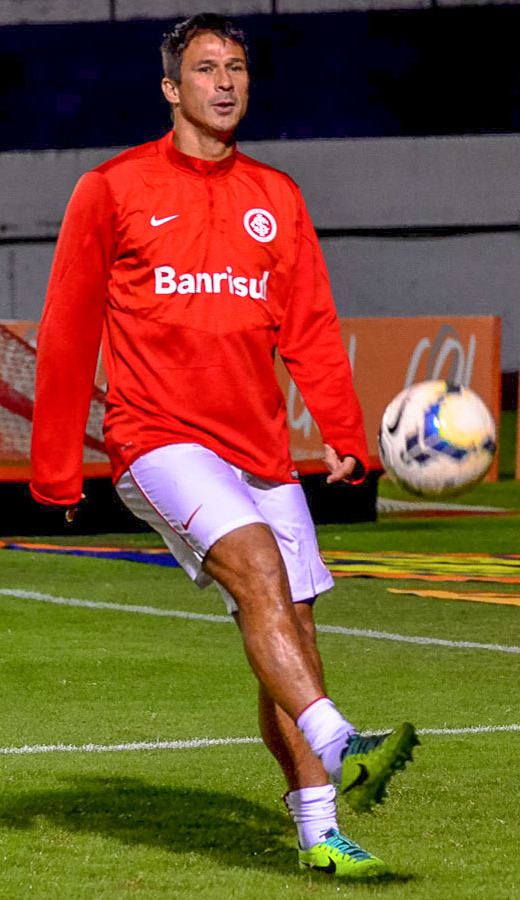

Personal information
- Full name: Marcos Antônio de Lima
- Date of birth: 14 February 1975 (age 51)
- Place of birth: Maracaí, São Paulo, Brazil
- Height: 1.80 m (5 ft 11 in)
- Position: Centre-back

Youth career
- 1993–1994: Novorizontino

Senior career*
Years	Team	Apps	(Gls)
1995–1996	Novorizontino	14	(0)
1997–1998	Bragantino	18	(0)
1999	Santo André	15	(1)
2000	Figueirense	8	(2)
2000	Botafogo-SP	8	(0)
2001	América-MG	14	(4)
2002–2004	Juventude	55	(8)
2005–2014	Internacional	350	(32)
- * Club domestic league appearances and goals

Marcos Antônio de Lima (born 14 February 1975), commonly known as Índio, is a former Brazilian footballer who played as a centre-back. He spent most of his career for Internacional.

== Honours ==
=== Internacional ===
- Campeonato Gaúcho: 2005, 2008, 2009, 2011, 2012, 2013, 2014
- Copa Libertadores: 2006, 2010
- FIFA Club World Championship: 2006
- Recopa Sudamericana: 2007, 2011
- Copa Sudamericana: 2008
- Suruga Bank Championship: 2009

=== Individual ===
- Bola de Prata: 2006
