= Sandro Sotilli =

Brazilian footballer

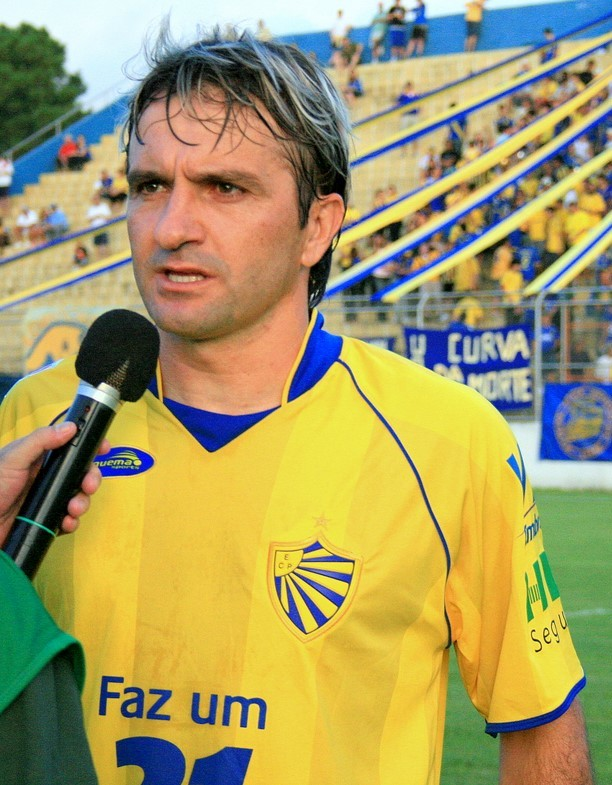
- Image of Sandro Sotilli

Personal information
- Full name: Sandro Carlos Sotilli
- Date of birth: 18 August 1973 (age 53)
- Place of birth: Rondinha, Brazil
- Position: Forward

Senior career*
Years	Team	Apps	(Gls)
–1997	→ Ypiranga (loan)		
1995	Tabajara-Guaíba		
1996	→ Veranópolis (loan)		
1997–1998	Internacional	10	(2)
1998	Juventude	21	(2)
1999	Rio Branco		
1999	Ceará		
1999	Caxias		
2000	Beijing Guoan		
2001	Paulista		
2002	15 de Novembro		
2002	Harbin Guoli		
2003	15 de Novembro		
2004	Glória		
2004–2005	Necaxa	33	(6)
2006	Chiapas	6	(1)
2006	Dorados	15	(8)
2007	León	14	(4)
2007	Caxias		
2008	Veranópolis		
2008	Pelotas		
2009	São José	10	(11)
2009	Pelotas		
2010	Brasil de Farroupilha		
2010	Pelotas	19	(8)
2010	Chapecoense	3	(0)
2010–2011	Pelotas	20	(7)
2011	São Paulo		
2011	Passo Fundo		
2012	São Luiz	9	(0)
2012	Passo Fundo		
2012	Pelotas		
2013	Glória		
2013	Gaúcho		
2014	Marau		
2014	Pelotas	6	(1)
- * Club domestic league appearances and goals

Sandro Carlos Sotilli (born 18 August 1973) is a Brazilian retired footballer.

He retired as the top scorer in Campeonato Gaúcho history with 111 goals.
