= Ângelo (footballer, born 1984) =

Brazilian footballer

Personal information
- Full name: Ângelo Ricardo Versari
- Date of birth: April 27, 1984 (age 42)
- Place of birth: Campo Mourão, Brazil
- Height: 1.75 m (5 ft 9 in)
- Position: Right wing back

Team information
- Current team: Joinville

Youth career
- 1998–2002: Atlético Paranaense

Senior career*
Years	Team	Apps	(Gls)
2003	Atlético Paranaense	-	(-)
2004	Operário Ferroviário	-	(-)
2004–2012	ADAP Galo Maringá	-	(-)
2006	→ Al Sadd (loan)	-	(-)
2007	→ Paraná (loan)	-	(-)
2007–2008	→ Cruzeiro (loan)	4	(1)
2008	→ Paraná (loan)	-	(-)
2008	→ Internacional (loan)	10	(1)
2009	→ Náutico (loan)	-	(-)
2009–2010	→ Coritiba (loan)	33	(1)
2011	→ Grêmio Prudente (loan)	-	(-)
2012–	Joinville		
- * Club domestic league appearances and goals

Ângelo Ricardo Versari (born April 27, 1984, in Campo Mourão), or simply Ângelo, is a Brazilian right wingback who plays for Joinville Esporte Clube.
