= Eduardo Gottardi =

Brazilian footballer (born 1985)

Personal information
- Full name: Eduardo Gottardi
- Date of birth: 18 October 1985 (age 41)
- Place of birth: Encantado, Brazil
- Height: 1.93 m (6 ft 4 in)
- Position: Goalkeeper

Team information
- Current team: Nacional
- Number: 12

Youth career
- 2000: Internacional
- 2005–2006: Esportivo

Senior career*
Years	Team	Apps	(Gls)
2006	Internacional	0	(0)
2006–2007	Santa Cruz	39	(0)
2008	Portuguesa	10	(0)
2009	Oeste	0	(0)
2010	Toledo	0	(0)
2010	Juventude	0	(0)
2010–2012	União Leiria	38	(0)
2012–2016	Nacional	50	(0)
2016–2017	Marítimo	0	(0)
- * Club domestic league appearances and goals

Eduardo Gottardi (born October 18, 1985), is a Brazilian footballer who plays as a goalkeeper. He currently plays for Portuguese Primeira Liga side Marítimo.

Gottardi previously played for Portuguesa in the Campeonato Brasileiro.
