= Sociedade Esportiva Recreativa e Cultural Brasil =

Brasil de Farroupilha
- Full name: Sociedade Esportiva Recreativa e Cultural Brasil
- Nickname(s): Brasilzinho; Rubro-Verde
- Founded: January 15, 1939 (86 years ago)
- Ground: Castanheiras
- Capacity: 5,000
- President: Flávio Daniel Cortiana
- Head coach: Leandro Machado
- Website: http://www.brasildefarroupilha.esp.br/
Home colours	Away colours

Sociedade Esportiva Recreativa e Cultural Brasil, commonly referred to as Brasil de Farroupilha, is a Brazilian football club based in Farroupilha, Rio Grande do Sul. It currently plays in Campeonato Gaúcho Série A2, the second level of the Rio Grande do Sul state football league.

== History ==
Sociedade Esportiva Recreativa e Cultural Brasil was founded on January 19, 1939. They won the Campeonato Gaúcho Second Level in 1992, after beating 14 de Julho in the final. Brasil de Farroupilha's Renato Teixeira, with 23 goals, was the league's top goalscorer.

== Stadium ==
Brasil de Farroupilha play their home games at Estádio das Castanheiras. The stadium has a maximum capacity of 5,000 people.

== Current squad (selected) ==
Note: Flags indicate national team as defined under FIFA eligibility rules; some limited exceptions apply. Players may hold more than one non-FIFA nationality.

No.	Pos.	Nation	Player
—	GK	BRA	Luiz Müller
—	GK	BRA	Alessandro
—	GK	BRA	Gil
—	GK	BRA	Giovani
—	DF	BRA	Diego Konig
—	DF	BRA	Renan Lavechia
—	DF	BRA	Sena
—	DF	BRA	Heverton
—	DF	BRA	Santos
—	DF	BRA	Ademir
—	MF	BRA	Agnaldo

No.	Pos.	Nation	Player
—	MF	BRA	Marquinhos
—	MF	BRA	Michael Figueiredo
—	MF	BRA	Tiago Rodrigues
—	FW	BRA	Eduardo da Silva
—	FW	BRA	Jean Michel
—	FW	BRA	Gavião
—	FW	BRA	Berg
—	FW	BRA	Guto
—	FW	BRA	Ramon Costa
—	FW	BRA	Adão
—	FW	BRA	Kito
—	FW	BRA	Geraldo Batista

== Honours ==
- Campeonato Gaúcho Série A2
  - Winners (1): 1992
- Campeonato Gaúcho Série B
  - Runners-up (1): 2019
