= São Gabriel Futebol Clube =

São Gabriel
- Full name: São Gabriel Futebol Clube
- Founded: 2000
- Dissolved: 2013
- Ground: Estádio Sílvio de Faria Correia, São Gabriel, Rio Grande do Sul state, Brazil
- Capacity: 8,500
- President: André Petrarca
- Head Coach: Marcelo Estigarribia
Home colours	Away colours

São Gabriel Futebol Clube, commonly known as São Gabriel, was a Brazilian football club based in São Gabriel, Rio Grande do Sul state. They competed in the Copa do Brasil once.

== History ==
The club was founded in 2000 after two local clubs, named Sociedade Esportiva e Recreativa São Gabriel and Grêmio Esportivo Gabrielense, merged. São Gabriel won the Torneio Cidade de São Gabriel in 2004 and in 2006. The club competed in the Copa do Brasil in 2004, when they were eliminated in the Second Round by Palmeiras, after eliminating Figueirense in the First Round.

== Honours ==
=== State ===
- Campeonato Gaúcho Série A2
  - Runners-up (2): 1980, 2001

=== City ===
- Torneio Cidade de São Gabriel
  - Winners (2): 2004, 2006

== Stadium ==
São Gabriel Futebol Clube play their home games at Estádio Sílvio de Faria Correia. The stadium has a maximum capacity of 8,500 people.
