= Palmeira das Missões =

Municipality in Rio Grande do Sul, Brazil

Coordinates: 27°55′S 53°17′W

- Municipality
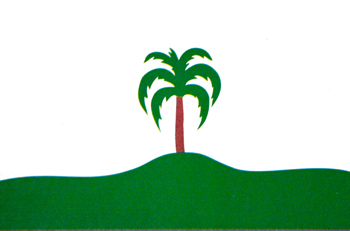
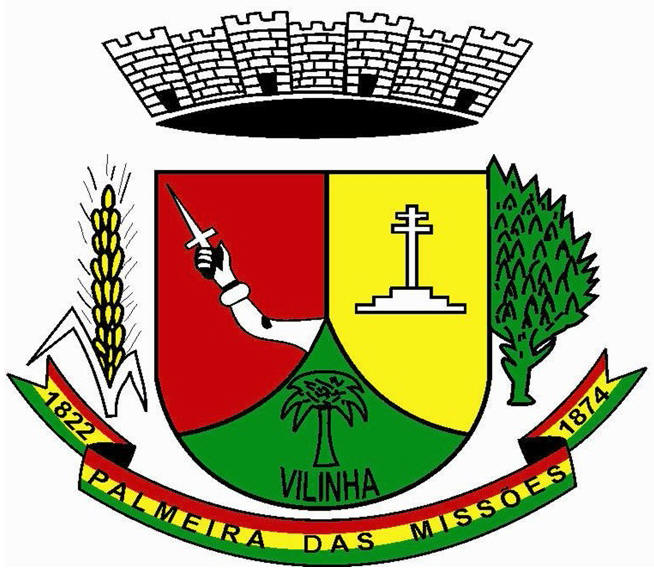
- Flag Coat of arms
- Interactive map of Palmeira das Missões
- Country: Brazil
- Time zone: UTC−3 (BRT)

Palmeira das Missões is a municipality in the state of Rio Grande do Sul, Brazil. As of 2020, the estimated population was 33,131.

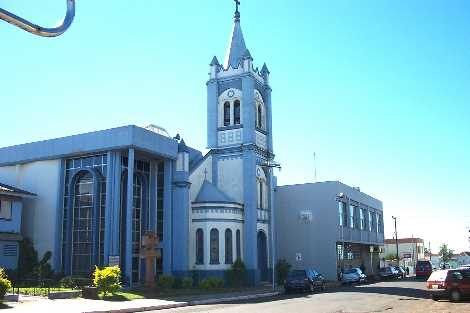
Mother Church in Palmeira das Missões

== See also ==
- List of municipalities in Rio Grande do Sul
