= Sociedade Esportiva e Recreativa Santo Ângelo =

Santo Ângelo
- Full name: Sociedade Esportiva e Recreativa Santo Ângelo
- Nickname(s): SER
- Founded: September 26, 1989
- Ground: Estádio da Zona Sul, Santo Ângelo, Rio Grande do Sul state, Brazil
- Capacity: 8,000
| Home colors | Away colors |

Associação Esportiva e Recreativa Santo Ângelo, commonly known as Santo Ângelo, is a Brazilian football club based in Santo Ângelo, Rio Grande do Sul state. The club was formerly known as Sociedade Esportiva e Recreativa Santo Ângelo.

== History ==
The club was founded on September 26, 1989, after the merger of three local clubs: Grêmio Esportivo Santoangelense, Tamoyo Futebol Clube and Elite Clube Desportivo. The club won the Campeonato Gaúcho Second Level in 1995, after beating Palmeira das Missões-based club Palmeirense in the final. The club was renamed to Associação Esportiva e Recreativa Santo Ângelo in June 2011.

== Honours ==
- Campeonato Gaúcho Série A2
  - Winners (1): 1995

== Stadium ==
Associação Esportiva e Recreativa Santo Ângelo play their home games at Estádio da Zona Sul. The stadium has a maximum capacity of 8,000 people.
