= Esporte Clube São Luiz =

Brazilian football club

São Luiz
- Full name: Esporte Clube São Luiz
- Nickname: Rubro (Red)
- Founded: February 20, 1938; 88 years ago
- Ground: Estádio 19 de Outubro
- Capacity: 8,000
- President: Pedro Pittol
- Head coach: Leandro Herthert
- League: Campeonato Brasileiro Série D Campeonato Gaúcho
- 2025 2025: Série D, 52nd of 64; Gaúcho, 6th of 12
- Website: http://www.saoluizdeijui.com.br/
Home colors	Away colors	Third colors

Esporte Clube São Luiz, commonly known as São Luiz, is a Brazilian professional association football club based in Ijuí, Rio Grande do Sul. The team plays in Série D, the fourth tier of the Brazilian football league system, as well as in the Gauchão Série A, the top tier of the Rio Grande do Sul state football league.

== Current squad ==
Note: Flags indicate national team as defined under FIFA eligibility rules; some limited exceptions apply. Players may hold more than one non-FIFA nationality.

No.	Pos.	Nation	Player
—	GK	BRA	Altieri
—	GK	BRA	Célio
—	GK	BRA	Vanderlei
—	DF	BRA	Da Silva
—	DF	BRA	Danilo Baia
—	DF	BRA	João Paulo
—	DF	BRA	Marcelo Mineiro
—	FW	BRA	Sandro Sotilli
—	DF	BRA	Tatto
—	DF	BRA	Thiago Costa
—	DF	BRA	Xaro
—	MF	BRA	Baiano
—	MF	BRA	Cássio

No.	Pos.	Nation	Player
—	MF	BRA	Márcio Oldra
—	MF	BRA	Quim
—	MF	BRA	Ruy Netto
—	MF	BRA	Thiago Corrêa
—	MF	BRA	Willian Santos
—	MF	URU	Alejandro Correa
—	FW	BRA	William de Amorim
—	FW	BRA	Adriano Paulista
—	FW	BRA	Douglas
—	FW	BRA	Éderson
—	FW	BRA	Sandro Sotilli
—	FW	BRA	Sharlei
—	FW	BRA	Tiago França

== Honours ==
- Campeonato Gaúcho Série A2
  - Winners (3): 1990, 2005, 2017
- Copa Mais Fácil
  - Winners (1): 1999
- Copa FGF
  - Winners (2): 2022, 2023
- Recopa Gaúcha
  - Winners (1): 2024
- Taça Farroupilha
  - Winners (1): 2026
