= Nick Leslau =

English commercial property investor (born 1959)

- Born: 18 August 1959 (age 67); Cricklewood, London, England
- Education: Mill Hill School
- Occupation: Investor
- Employer: Prestbury Investment Holdings
- Known for: Commercial property investment
- Spouse: Maxine Leslau
- Children: 3

Nick Leslau (born 18 August 1959) is an English commercial property investor and the chairman and chief executive of Prestbury Investment Holdings Limited, and chairman of Prestbury Investments LLP. He is a 30 percent shareholder in Prestbury's AIM listed Secure Income REIT. He has an estimated net worth of £400 million. Secure Income REIT owns 20 private hospitals and 55 Travelodge hotels in the UK.

== Early life ==
The son of a jeweller and part-time art historian, his parents divorced when he was nine. His mother subsequently worked full-time so that Leslau could be educated at a preparatory school in Hampstead, and at Mill Hill School. Leslau left the University of Warwick where he was studying German, to study quantity surveying.

== Career ==
After meeting Sam Rosen, Leslau joined the ground rent company of commodities traders Burford Group. He had completed a degree in estate management at South Bank University, and became a Royal Institution of Chartered Surveyors (RICS) qualified and registered chartered surveyor with Burford. At age 23, he became CEO of Burford Estate & Property.

Wanting to move further into property, Leslau contacted Nigel Wray to engineer a reverse takeover of Wray's listed company Chartsearch in 1986 for £8 million. They expanded the company into a £1 billion enterprise, buying large parts of Oxford Street and the London Trocadero. However, a poor deal with Sega in the creation of SegaWorld as an anchor tenant meant the company went through some difficult times.

=== Prestbury ===
In 1997, Leslau and Wray set up their own small property company Maybeat Limited, which they merged into one of Michael Edelson's Alternative Investment Market listed shell companies called Prestbury Group plc.

The board consisted of Leslau, Wray, Viscount Astor, John Hodson (the then chief executive of private bank Singer & Friedlander), and Edelson. Over the next two years, it produced a return of 150% on net asset value, and Leslau grew its total value to several hundreds of millions of pounds before taking it private in 2004.

In February 2001, Leslau set up private company, Prestbury Investments, which he used as the vehicle to take Prestbury Group plc private in 2004. Leslau is now chairman and chief executive of PIHL, with the company owning a property portfolio estimated to be worth in excess of £4 billion.

In 2011, Leslau bought the London marina St Katharine Docks for £156 million through subsidiary Max Property Group. In 2014, he sold it to the Blackstone Group for nearly £450 million.

=== Knutsford plc ===
In 1999, Leslau set up an investment vehicle, Edenhawk, together with Wray, Archie Norman, and Julian Richer. Once again, they merged the company into an Edelson shell company, Knutsford Plc. The intention was to acquire a retail business to take advantage of the retailing skills of Norman, a former chairman of Asda, and Richer, who had built up the retail group Richer Sounds. Within weeks, the value of Knutsford had soared to £1 billion, attracting attention from financial media around the world as potential acquisition targets were touted by the media such as Marks & Spencer and Sainsbury's. The overly speculative valuation was far in excess of anything the 'Knutsford 4' and Edelson had anticipated, and was in fact becoming problematic, particularly because it proved a major stumbling block to concluding any deal. Although Knutsford eventually concluded a deal with WI Link (which continues to trade successfully), it could never hope to achieve the dizzy expectations generated by the media in the weeks after flotation. Knutsford is cited as a case history in a number of business schools, and is considered to have been the end of the dot com boom in the UK.

== Political activity ==
Leslau has donated to the Conservative Party, and was a signatory to a letter to The Daily Telegraph during the 2015 United Kingdom general election campaign; which praised the party's economic policies, and claimed that a Labour government under Ed Miliband would "threaten jobs and deter investment".

Leslau pledged to end donations to the Conservatives due to the government's ban on evictions during the COVID-19 pandemic, stating that: "I think the flippancy with which the property industry has been treated has been narrow-minded".

== Personal life ==
Leslau and his wife Maxine have been married for over 30 years, the couple have three sons. They previously lived in a £40 million property in Mayfair, London but now reside in Monte-Carlo, own the 40-metre Mediterranean-based yacht Mimi La Sardine, and also own a private aircraft Hawker 850XP. Leslau owns one of W. G. Grace's cricket bats as part of his extensive sports memorabilia collection, and was a part owner of Saracens F.C. rugby union club. In 2019, he stepped down from the board of Saracens after 21 years as board director.

In early 2008, Leslau took part in the Channel 4 programme Secret Millionaire, giving away £225,000 in a ten-day visit to Possilpark, Glasgow.

Leslau is Jewish.
