= Michael Edelson =

British football director

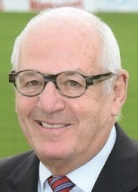
- Edelson in 2016
- Born: John Michael Edelson; 7 July 1944 (age 82); Oldham Lancashire, United Kingdom
- Other name: The Shellmeister
- Education: Bury Grammar School
- Occupation: Entrepreneur
- Known for: Director of Manchester United
- Spouse: Jacky

Michael Edelson is a non-executive director of Manchester United. He is an angel investor, venture capitalist and philanthropist. He has been instrumental in creating numerous cash shell companies on both AIM and PLUS. As a result of his assistance in creating these companies, he was nicknamed "The Shell Meister" by Richard Rivlin in an article in The Sunday Telegraph in 1996.

Edelson was educated at Bury Grammar School. He joined his family’s business upon leaving Sixth Form.

== Biography ==
Educated at Bury Grammar School, he was an amateur footballer playing for Oldham Athletic and Stoke City Reserves between 1960 and 1964, before joining the family business full-time in 1964. In the mid-1990s, he took a stake in Conrad Continental Limited, an ailing Manchester textile company that was listed on the London Stock Exchange. After the conversion of Conrad into a cash shell, Conrad acquired Sheffield United via a reverse takeover, and as a result a new route for companies to obtain a listing on a stock exchange had been created and Edelson's stock market career was launched.

In the late 1990s, he was involved in a flurry of similar deals bringing to market larger companies, such as Prestbury Group with Nigel Wray and Nick Leslau, The Pharmacy Restaurant in Notting Hill with Matthew Freud and Damien Hirst and most famously Knutsford, where his co-investors were Julian Richer, Sir Archie Norman and again Wray and Leslau.

As a result of all of the transactions, he was dubbed "The Shell Meister" by City journalist Richard Rivlin in the Sunday Telegraph. He has floated over 20 companies since Prestbury and brought in budding entrepreneurs, such as Abby Hardoon of Magic Moments and later Host Europe and Nick Robertson of ASOS. ASOS now has over 2,000 employees and is the United Kingdom's largest independent online and fashion beauty retailer.

He was also the chair of the AIM-listed company SysGroup, which he originally founded, until it was taken over in 2023 and remains on the board of a number of smaller private companies and charitable trusts.

Starting in 1981, for three years in a row, Edelson became a judge for Miss World alongside its founder Eric Morley, as well as Dodi Fayed and Bruce Forsyth.

=== Manchester United ===
Edelson is a non-executive Director of Manchester United and has been in that role since 1982. He was appointed to the board by Martin Edwards to replace Matt Busby, who had become club president earlier the same year. Edelson joined James Gulliver – who had built up the Edwards family meat business into the £4 billion Argyll Group – and Alan Gibson – the son of James Gibson, who was Manchester United's chairman from 1932 to 1951, and whose loans saved the club from extinction.

Edelson was one of the founder members of the Manchester United Foundation and remains a trustee on the Foundation's Board, as well as being involved in a number of other charities.

Edelson went into retirement for a few years until he assisted with joining the 30 Seconds Group.

== Publications ==
1. Manchester United and M.E. (December 2020) "Manchester United and M.E". the-hub-london. 7 January 2021.
