= FIFA Club World Cup =

Men's football tournament

- Organiser(s): FIFA
- Founded: 2000; 26 years ago
- Region: International
- Teams: 32 (from 6 confederations)
- Related competitions: FIFA Intercontinental Cup
- Current champions: (England) Chelsea (2nd title)
- Most championships: (Spain) Real Madrid (5 titles)
- Website: fifa.com/club-world-cup
- 2029 FIFA Club World Cup

The FIFA Club World Cup (FIFA CWC) is a men's association football club competition organised by the Fédération Internationale de Football Association (FIFA), the sport's global governing body. The competition was first contested in 2000 as the FIFA Club World Championship. It was not held from 2001 to 2004 due to a combination of factors, chiefly the collapse of FIFA's marketing partner International Sport and Leisure (ISL). It returned in 2005 as an annual competition until 2023. Following the 2023 edition, the tournament was restructured into a quadrennial event beginning in 2025, adopting a format similar to that of the FIFA World Cup. The current world champions are Chelsea, who defeated Paris Saint-Germain 3–0 in the 2025 final.

The first FIFA Club World Championship took place in Brazil in 2000, during which year it ran in parallel with the Intercontinental Cup, a competition played by the winners of the UEFA Champions League and the Copa Libertadores, with the champions of each tournament both retroactively recognised by FIFA as club world champions in 2017. In 2005, the Intercontinental Cup was merged with the FIFA Club World Championship, and in 2006, the tournament was renamed as the FIFA Club World Cup. The winner of the Club World Cup receives the FIFA Club World Cup trophy and a FIFA Champions Badge.

The current format, which came into effect with the 2025 edition, features 32 teams competing for the title at venues within the host nation; 12 teams from Europe, 6 from South America, 4 from Africa, 4 from Asia, 4 from North, Central America and Caribbean, 1 from Oceania, and 1 team from the host nation. All non-host teams qualify through results in their confederation's top club competition. The teams are drawn into eight groups of four, with each team playing three group stage matches in a round-robin format. The top two teams from each group advance to the knockout stage, starting with the round of 16 and culminating with the final.

Real Madrid hold the record for most titles, having won the competition five times. Corinthians' inaugural victory remains the best result from a host nation's national league champions. Teams from Spain have won the tournament eight times, the most for any nation. England has the largest number of winning teams, with four clubs having won the tournament.

== History ==
=== Origin ===
The first club tournament to be billed as the Football World Championship was held in 1887, in which FA Cup winners Aston Villa beat Scottish Cup winners Hibernian, the winners of the only national competitions at the time. The first time when the champions of two European leagues met was in what was nicknamed the 1895 World Championship, when English champions Sunderland beat Scottish champions Heart of Midlothian 5–3. Ironically, the Sunderland lineup in the 1895 World Championship consisted entirely of Scottish players – Scottish players who moved to England to play professionally in those days were known as the Scotch Professors.

The first attempt at creating a global club football tournament, according to FIFA, was in 1909, 21 years before the first FIFA World Cup. The Sir Thomas Lipton Trophy was held in Italy in 1909 and 1911, and contested by English, Italian, German and Swiss clubs. English amateur team West Auckland won on both occasions.

The idea that FIFA should organise international club competitions dates from the beginning of the 1950s. In 1951, the Brazilian FA created Copa Rio, also called "World Champions Cup" in Brazil, with a view to being a Club World Cup (a "club version" of the FIFA World Cup). FIFA president Jules Rimet was asked about FIFA's involvement in Copa Rio, and stated that it was not under FIFA's jurisdiction since it was organised and sponsored by the Brazilian FA. FIFA board officials Stanley Rous and Ottorino Barassi participated personally, albeit not as FIFA assignees, in the organisation of Copa Rio in 1951. Rous' role was the negotiations with European clubs, whereas Barassi did the same and also helped form the framework of the competition. The Italian press regarded the competition as an "impressive project" that "was greeted so enthusiastically by FIFA officials Stanley Rous and Jules Rimet to the extent of almost giving it an official FIFA stamp." Because of the difficulty the Brazilian FA found in bringing European clubs to the competition, the O Estado de S. Paulo newspaper suggested that there should be FIFA involvement in the programming of international club competitions saying that, "ideally, international tournaments, here or abroad, should be played with a schedule set by FIFA". Palmeiras beat Juventus at Maracanã with over 200,000 spectators in attendance at the final of the 1951 Copa Rio, and were hailed as the first ever Club World Champions by the whole Brazilian press. However, as a number of European clubs declined participation in Copa Rio and their berths were given to less renowned ones, the quality of the eventually participating clubs was criticised in the Brazilian press, therefore the Brazilian FA announced that the following editions of Copa Rio were not to be hailed as a World Champions Cup but only as Copa Rio, and thus the second edition of the cup, won by Fluminense in 1952, was hailed as a World Champions Cup by a minority of the Brazilian press, having Copa Rio been extinguished by the Brazilian FA soon later, and replaced with another cup, won in 1953 by Vasco da Gama.

Still in the 1950s, the Pequeña Copa del Mundo (Spanish for Small World Cup) was a tournament held in Venezuela between 1952 and 1957, with some other club tournaments held in Caracas from 1958 onwards also often referred to by the name of the original 1952–1957 tournament. It was usually played by four participants, with two from Europe and two from South America.

In 1960, FIFA authorised the International Soccer League, created along the lines of the 1950s Copa Rio, with a view to creating a Club World Cup, with ratification from Stanley Rous, who then had become FIFA president. In the same year, the Intercontinental Cup rose to existence.

=== The Intercontinental Cup and early proposals for a FIFA Club World Cup ===
We want to win the title, not so much for ourselves but to prevent Racing from being champions.

— Jock Stein, Celtic Football Club's manager, 1965–1978, commenting before the play-off match of the 1967 Intercontinental Cup known as The Battle of Montevideo; Evening Times, 3 November 1967.

The Dutch team AFC Ajax claimed a victory without any problems and this match was no more difficult than a banal encounter at the European Cup.

— A Dutch newspaper journalist from Amsterdam, commenting on the quality of the competition and Ajax's opponent after the 1972 Intercontinental Cup; De Telegraaf, 30 September 1972.

The indifference of the fans is the only explanation for our financial failure [at the Intercontinental Cup]. It would be much better if we had gotten a friendly similar to the one we would do in Tel Aviv, on 11 January, for US$255,000.

— Dettmar Cramer, Bayern Munich's manager, 1975–1977, commenting on the low relevance, prestige and rewards of the Intercontinental Cup after his team's victory in 1976; Jornal do Brasil, 22 December 1976.

The Tournoi de Paris was a competition initially meant to bring together the top teams from Europe and South America; it was first played in 1957 when Vasco da Gama, the Rio de Janeiro champions, beat European champions Real Madrid 4–3 in the final at the Parc des Princes. The match was the first ever hailed as the "best of Europe X best of South American" club match, as it was Real Madrid's first intercontinental competition as European champions (the Madrid team played the 1956 Pequeña Copa del Mundo, but confirmed their participation in the Venezuelan tournament before becoming European champions). In 1958, Real Madrid declined to participate in the Paris competition claiming that the final of the 1957–58 European Cup was just five days after the Paris Tournoi. On 8 October 1958, the Brazilian FA President João Havelange announced, at a UEFA meeting he attended as an invitee, the decision to create the "best of Europe X best of South American" club contest with endorsement from UEFA and CONMEBOL (also known as CSF): the Copa Libertadores, the CONMEBOL-endorsed South American equivalent of the UEFA-endorsed European Cup, and the Intercontinental Cup, the latter being a UEFA/CONMEBOL-endorsed "best club of the world" contest between the champion clubs of both confederations.

Real Madrid won the first Intercontinental Cup in 1960, titled themselves world champions until FIFA stepped in and objected; citing that the competition did not grant the right to attempt participation to any other champions from outside Europe and South America, FIFA stated that they can only claim to be intercontinental champions of a competition played between two continental organisations (in contrast to the Intercontinental Cup, the right to attempt participation at the FIFA World Cup, through FIFA invitation in 1930 and qualification process since 1934, was open to every FIFA member-country, regardless of the continent where it was located). FIFA stated that they would prohibit the 1961 edition to be played out unless the organisers regarded the competition as a friendly or a private match between two organisations.

The Intercontinental Cup attracted the interest of other continents. The North and Central America confederation, CONCACAF, was created in 1961 in order to, among other reasons, try to include its clubs in the Copa Libertadores and, by extension, the Intercontinental Cup. However, their entry into both competitions was rejected. Subsequently, the CONCACAF Champions' Cup began in 1962.

Due to the brutality of the Argentine and Uruguayan clubs at the Intercontinental Cup, FIFA was asked several times during the late 1960s to assess penalties and regulate the tournament. However, FIFA refused each request. The first of these requests was made in 1967, after a play-off match labelled The Battle of Montevideo. The Scottish Football Association, via President Willie Allan, wanted FIFA to recognise the competition in order to enforce football regulation; FIFA responded that it could not regulate a competition it did not organise. Allan's crusade also suffered after CONMEBOL, with the backing of its President Teofilo Salinas and the Argentine Football Association (Asociación del Fútbol Argentino; AFA), refused to allow FIFA to have any hand in the competition stating:

The CSF is the entity in charge of controlling, in South America, the organisation of the tournament between the champions of Europe and [South] America, a competition FIFA considers a friendly. We do not think it's appropriate that FIFA has to meddle in the matter.

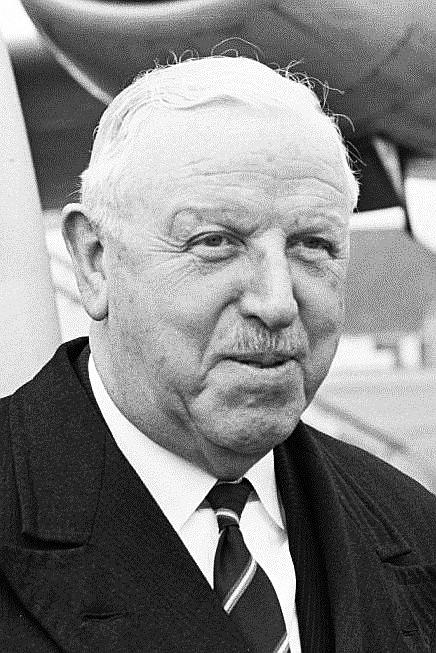
Stanley Rous can be considered a "founding father" of the road for a club world cup. As a referee, he participated in the 1930 Coupe des Nations. As a football official, he endorsed and supported Copa Rio and the International Soccer League. As FIFA president, he was the first FIFA official to propose the expansion of the Intercontinental Cup into an all-confederations Club World Cup under FIFA auspices, a proposal he put forward in 1967 and that would turn into the FIFA Club World Cup in 2000

René Courte, FIFA's General Sub-Secretary, wrote in 1967 an article shortly afterwards stating that FIFA viewed the Intercontinental Cup as a "European-South American friendly match". This was confirmed by FIFA president Stanley Rous. With the Asian and North American club competitions in place in 1967, FIFA opened the idea of supervising the Intercontinental Cup if it included those confederations, with Stanley Rous saying that CONCACAF and the Asian Football Confederation had requested in 1967 participation of their champions in the Intercontinental Cup; the proposal was met with a negative response from UEFA and CONMEBOL. The 1968 and 1969 Intercontinental Cups finished in similarly violent fashion, with Manchester United manager Matt Busby insisting that "the Argentineans should be banned from all competitive football. FIFA should really step in." In 1970, the FIFA Executive Committee proposed the creation of a multicontinental Club World Cup, not limited to Europe and South America but including also the other confederations; the idea did not go forward due to UEFA resistance.

In 1973, French newspaper L'Equipe, who helped bring about the birth of the European Cup, volunteered to sponsor a Club World Cup contested by the champions of Europe, South America, North America and Africa, the only continental club tournaments in existence at the time; the competition was to potentially take place in Paris between September and October 1974, with an eventual final to be held at the Parc des Princes. The extreme negativity of the Europeans prevented this from happening. The same newspaper tried once again in 1975 to create a Club World Cup, in which participants would have been the four semi-finalists of the European Cup, both finalists of the Copa Libertadores, as well as the African and Asian champions; once more, the proposal was to no avail. UEFA, via its president, Artemio Franchi, declined once again and the proposal failed. The idea for a multicontinental, FIFA-endorsed Club World Cup was also endorsed by João Havelange in his campaigning for FIFA presidency in 1974. The Mexican clubs América and Pumas UNAM, and the Mexican Football Association, demanded participation in the Intercontinental Cup (either as the American-continent representatives in the Intercontinental Cup or as part of a UEFA-CONMEBOL-CONCACAF new Intercontinental Cup) after winning the 1977–78 and 1980–81 editions of the Interamerican Cup against the South American champions; the request was unsuccessful.

The 1970s saw no fewer than seven occasions in which the European champions relinquished participating at the Intercontinental Cup, resulting in either the participation of the European Cup runners-up or the cancellation of the event; thus, with the Intercontinental Cup in danger of being dissolved, West Nally, a British marketing company, was hired by UEFA and CONMEBOL to find a viable solution in 1980; Toyota Motor Corporation, via West Nally, took the competition under its wing and rebranded it as the Toyota Cup, a one-off match played in Japan. Toyota invested over US$700,000 in the 1980 edition to take place in Tokyo's National Olympic Stadium, with over US$200,000 awarded to each participant. The Toyota Cup, with its new format, was received with scepticism, as the sport was unfamiliar in the Far East. However, the financial incentive was welcomed, as European and South American clubs were suffering financial difficulties. To protect themselves against the possibility of European withdrawals, Toyota, UEFA and every European Cup participant signed annual contracts requiring the eventual winners of the European Cup to participate at the Intercontinental Cup, as a condition UEFA stipulated to the clubs' participation in the European Cup, or risk facing an international lawsuit from UEFA and Toyota. For instance, Barcelona, the winners of the 1991–92 European Cup, considered not participating in the Intercontinental Cup in 1992, and the aforementioned contractual obligation weighed in for their decision to play. In 1983, the English Football Association tried organising a Club World Cup to be played in 1985 and sponsored by West Nally, only to be denied by UEFA.

=== Inauguration (2000–2001) ===
Manchester United see this as an opportunity to compete for the ultimate honour of being the very first world club champions.

— Martin Edwards, Manchester United's chairman, 1980–2002, commenting on the FIFA Club World Championship; British Broadcasting Corporation News, 30 June 1999.

The framework of the 2000 FIFA Club World Championship was laid years in advance. According to Sepp Blatter, the idea of the tournament was presented to the executive committee in December 1993 in Las Vegas, United States by Silvio Berlusconi, AC Milan's president. Since every confederation had, by then, a stable, continental championship, FIFA felt it was prudent and relevant to have a Club World Championship tournament. Initially, there were nine candidates to host the competition: China, Brazil, Mexico, Paraguay, Saudi Arabia, Tahiti, Turkey, the United States and Uruguay; of the nine, only Saudi Arabia, Mexico, Brazil and Uruguay confirmed their interest to FIFA. On 7 June 1999, FIFA selected Brazil to host the competition, which was initially scheduled to take place in 1999. Manchester United legend Bobby Charlton, a pillar of England's victorious campaign in the 1966 FIFA World Cup, stated that the Club World Championship provided "a fantastic chance of becoming the first genuine world champions". The competition gave away US$28 million in prize money and its TV rights, worth US$40 million, were sold to 15 broadcasters across five continents. The final draw of the first Club World Championship was done on 14 October 1999 at the Copacabana Palace Hotel in Rio de Janeiro.

There they were claiming that the English weren't interested in the world championship, yet the BBC sent 60 people to cover the tournament. This shows that it was the most important competition that they have taken part in in their history. They came here thinking they were going to win easily but they didn't count on the strength of Vasco. No Manchester player would get a place in the Vasco team at the moment. The Brazilians are the best players in the world, the Europeans do not even come close.

— Eurico Miranda, Vasco da Gama's vice-president, 1986–2000, commenting on the importance given to the tournament by the British news media, the level of European club football as well as Brazil's after his side's 3–1 win over Manchester United; Independent Online, 11 January 2000.

The inaugural competition was planned to be contested in 1999 by the continental club winners of 1998, the Intercontinental Cup winners and the host nation's national club champions, but it was postponed by one year. When it was rescheduled, the competition had eight new participants from the continental champions of 1999: Brazilian clubs Corinthians and Vasco da Gama, English side Manchester United, Mexican club Necaxa, Moroccan club Raja CA, Spanish side Real Madrid, Saudi club Al-Nassr, and Australian club South Melbourne. The first goal of the competition was scored by Real Madrid's Nicolas Anelka against Al-Nassr; Real Madrid went on to win the match 3–1. The final was an all-Brazilian affair, as well as the only one which saw one side have home advantage. Vasco da Gama could not take advantage of its local support, being beaten by Corinthians 4–3 on penalties after a 0–0 draw in 90 minutes and extra time.

The second edition of the competition was planned for Spain in 2001, and would have featured 12 clubs. The draw was performed at A Coruña on 6 March 2001. However, it was cancelled on 18 May, due to a combination of factors, most importantly the collapse of FIFA's marketing partner International Sport and Leisure. The participants of the cancelled edition received US$750,000 each in compensation; the Real Federación Española de Fútbol (RFEF) also received US$1 million from FIFA. Another attempt to stage the competition in 2003, in which 17 countries were looking to be the host nation, also failed to happen. FIFA agreed with UEFA, CONMEBOL and Toyota to merge the Intercontinental Cup and Club World Championship into one event. The final Intercontinental Cup, played by representatives clubs of most developed continents in the football world, was in 2004, with a relaunched Club World Championship held in Japan in December 2005. All the winning teams of the Intercontinental Cup were regarded by worldwide mass media and football's community as de facto "world champions" until 2017 when FIFA officially (de jure) recognised all of them as official club world champions in equal status to the FIFA Club World Cup winners.

=== Knock-out tournaments (2005–2023) ===
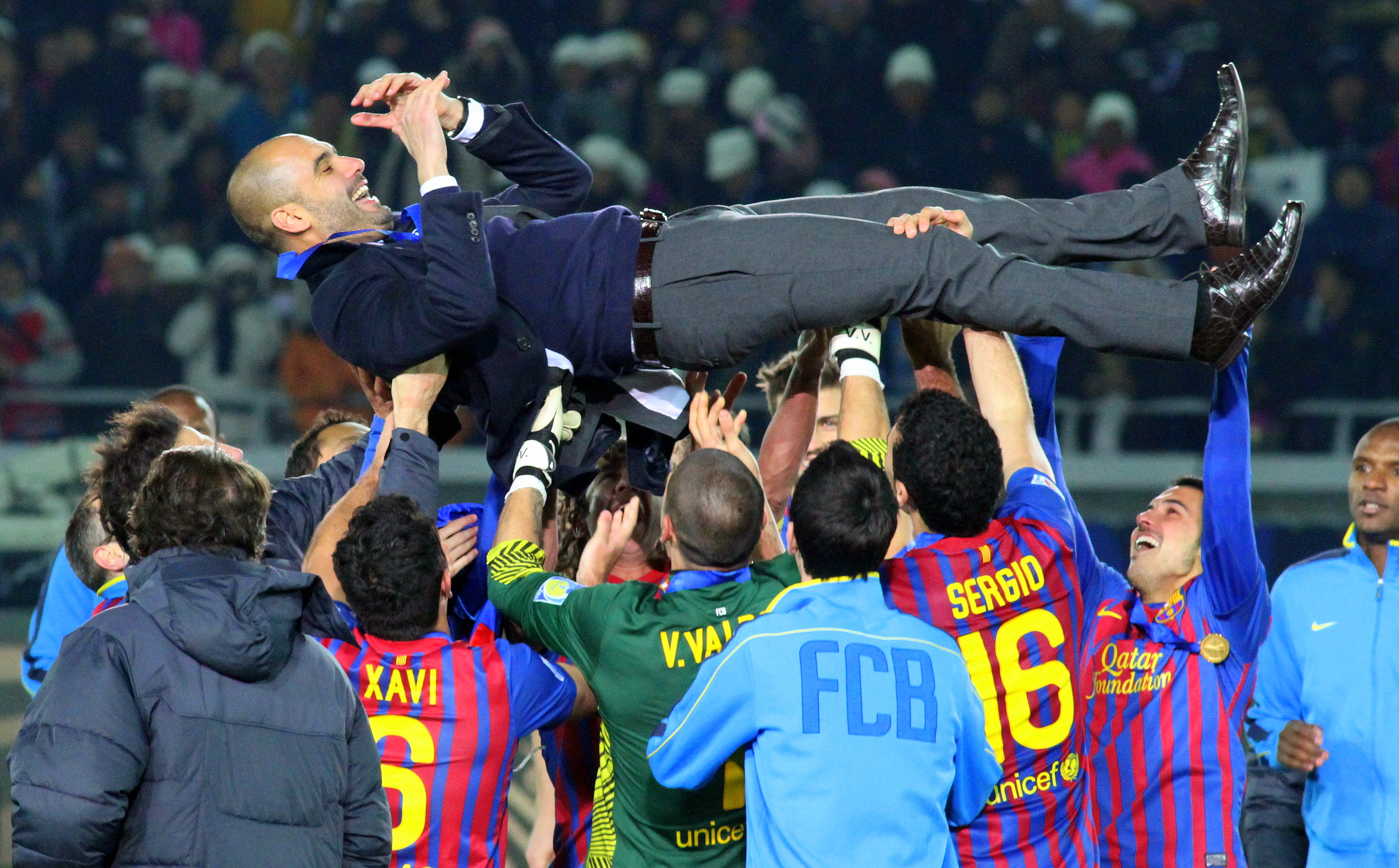
Pep Guardiola is hoisted in the air after Barcelona won the 2011 FIFA Club World Cup, beating Santos 4–0 in the final.

The 2005 version was shorter than the previous World Championship, reducing the problem of scheduling the tournament around the different club seasons across each continent. It contained just the six reigning continental champions, with the CONMEBOL and UEFA representatives receiving byes to the semi-finals. A new trophy was introduced replacing the Intercontinental trophy, the Toyota trophy and the trophy of 2000. The draw for the 2005 edition of the competition took place in Tokyo on 30 July 2005 at The Westin Tokyo. The 2005 edition saw São Paulo pushed to the limit by Saudi side Al-Ittihad to reach the final. In the final, one goal from Mineiro was enough to dispatch English club Liverpool; Mineiro became the first player to score in a Club World Cup final.

Internacional defeated defending World and South American champions São Paulo in the 2006 Copa Libertadores finals in order to qualify for the 2006 tournament. At the semi-finals, Internacional beat Egyptian side Al Ahly in order to meet Barcelona in the final. A late goal from Adriano Gabiru kept the trophy in Brazil. It was in 2007 when Brazilian hegemony was finally broken: AC Milan won a close match against Japan's Urawa Red Diamonds, who were pushed by over 67,000 fans at Yokohama's International Stadium, and won 1–0 to reach the final. In the final, Milan crushed Boca Juniors 4–2, in a match that saw the first player sent off in a Club World Cup final: Milan's Kakha Kaladze from Georgia in the 77th minute. Eleven minutes later, Boca Junior's Pablo Ledesma would join Kaladze as he too was sent off. The following year, Manchester United would emulate Milan by beating their semi-final opponents, Japan's Gamba Osaka, 5–3. They saw off Ecuadorian club LDU Quito 1–0 to become world champions in 2008.

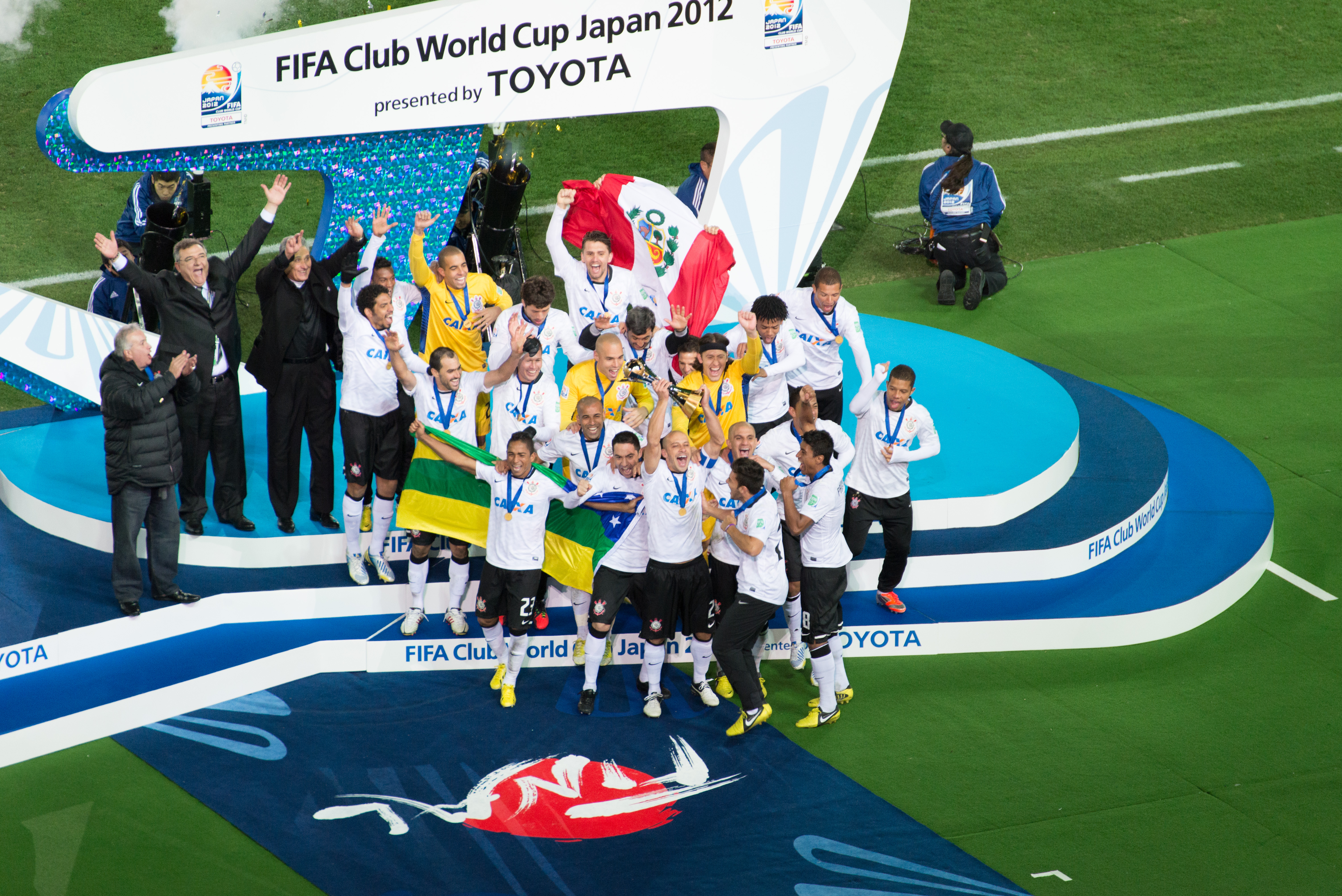
Corinthians won their second world title after defeating Chelsea 1–0 in the final, capping off a year which saw them undefeated in international matches with just four goals conceded.

United Arab Emirates successfully applied for the right to host the FIFA Club World Cup in 2009 and 2010. Barcelona dethroned World and European champions Manchester United in the 2009 UEFA Champions League final to qualify for the 2009 Club World Cup. Barcelona beat Mexican club Atlante in the semi-finals 3–1 and met Estudiantes in the final. After a very close encounter which saw the need for extra-time, Lionel Messi scored from a header to snatch victory for Barcelona and complete an unprecedented sextuple. The 2010 edition saw the first non-European and non-South American side to reach the final: TP Mazembe from the Democratic Republic of Congo defeated Brazil's Internacional 2–0 in the semi-final to face Internazionale, who beat South Korean club Seongnam Ilhwa Chunma 3–0 to reach the final. Internazionale went on to beat Mazembe with the same scoreline to complete their quintuple.

The FIFA Club World Cup returned to Japan for the 2011 and 2012 editions. In 2011, Barcelona comfortably won their semi-final match 4–0 against Qatari club Al Sadd. In the final, Barcelona won against Santos by the same scoreline for their second title. Messi also became the first player to score in two Club World Cup finals. The 2012 edition saw Europe's dominance come to an end as Corinthians, boasting over 30,000 travelling fans which was dubbed the "Invasão da Fiel", travelled to Japan to join Barcelona in being two-time winners of the competition. In the semi-finals, Al-Ahly managed to keep the scoreline close as Corinthians' Paolo Guerrero scored to send the Timão into their second final. Guerrero would once again come through for Corinthians as the Timão saw off English side Chelsea 1–0 in order to bring the trophy back to Brazil.

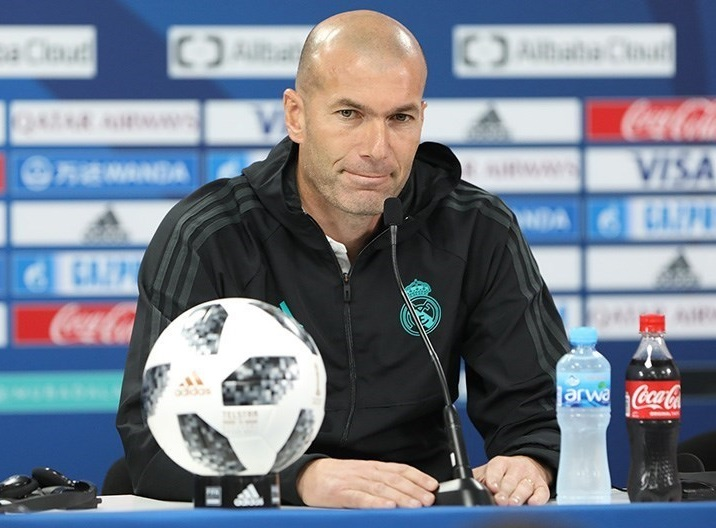
Zinedine Zidane during a press conference at the 2017 FIFA Club World Cup. Real Madrid became the first team to retain the trophy having also won the 2016 FIFA Club World Cup.

2013 and 2014 had the Club World Cup moving to Morocco. The first edition saw a Cinderella run of host team Raja CA, who had to start in the play-off round and became the second African team to reach the final, after defeating Brazil's Atlético Mineiro in the semi-final. Like Mazembe, Raja also lost to the European champion, this time a 2–0 defeat to Bayern Munich. 2014 again had a decision between South America and Europe, and Real Madrid beat San Lorenzo 2–0.

The 2015 and 2016 editions once again saw Japan as hosts for the 7th and 8th time respectively in the 12th and 13th editions of the FIFA Club World Cup. The 2015 edition saw a final between River Plate and FC Barcelona. FC Barcelona lifted their third FIFA Club World Cup, with Suarez scoring two goals and Lionel Messi scoring one goal in the final. One notable thing that occurred in the 2015 tournament was that Sanfrecce Hiroshima finished in third place, the best result achieved by a Japanese club at the time. This record would not last though, as the 2016 edition saw J1 League winners Kashima Antlers making it to the final against Real Madrid. A Gaku Shibasaki inspired Kashima attempted to win their first FIFA Club World Cup (a feat never done by any club outside of Europe and South America), but were denied by Real Madrid, who won 4–2 in extra time, thanks to a hat-trick by Cristiano Ronaldo.

The UAE returned to host the event in 2017 and 2018. 2017 involved the likes of Real Madrid becoming the first team in Club World Cup history to return to the tournament to defend their title. Real Madrid became the first team to successfully defend their title after defeating Grêmio in the Final, all while eliminating Al Jazira in the semi-finals. Al-Ain was the first Emirati team to reach the Club World Cup final, as well as the second Asian team to reach the final in the 2018 edition. Real Madrid defeated Al-Ain 4–1 in the final, to win their fourth title in the competition and to become the first team ever to win it three years in a row and four times in total in the tournament's history. Thus, Real Madrid extended their international titles to seven after winning the 2018 edition (counting their three Intercontinental Cup titles and four Club World Cup titles). (Note: The council of FIFA officially recognises the winners of the Intercontinental Cup and the FIFA Club World Cup as club world champions.)

On 3 June 2019, FIFA selected Qatar as the host of both the 2019 and 2020 events. Gonzalo Belloso, the Deputy Secretary General and development director of CONMEBOL, previously said that the 2019 and 2020 editions will be held in Japan. The 2019 edition saw Liverpool defeat Flamengo to win the competition for the first time. In the 2020 edition, Bayern Munich beat UANL 1–0, completing their sextuple.

In 2021, the way the tournament was hosted was changed, and the host was no longer chosen for two consecutive years. The 2021 edition, held in 2022 in the United Arab Emirates due to the impact of the COVID-19 pandemic on association football, saw Chelsea defeat Brazil's Palmeiras 2–1 after extra time in the final to claim their first title. The 2022 edition could not be held in December as usual due to the 2022 FIFA World Cup taking place in the winter, and there were rumours of the tournament being cancelled that year. However, in December 2022, FIFA announced that the tournament would start in February in Morocco. Saudi Arabia's Al-Hilal, by defeating Flamengo in the semi-finals, became the third Asian team to reach the final. However, they lost in the final, falling 5–3 to Real Madrid, which remains the highest-scoring final in the tournament's history. Manchester City was the last champion under this format, defeating Fluminense in the 2023 edition.

=== Expansion, increased prize money and format changes (2025–present) ===
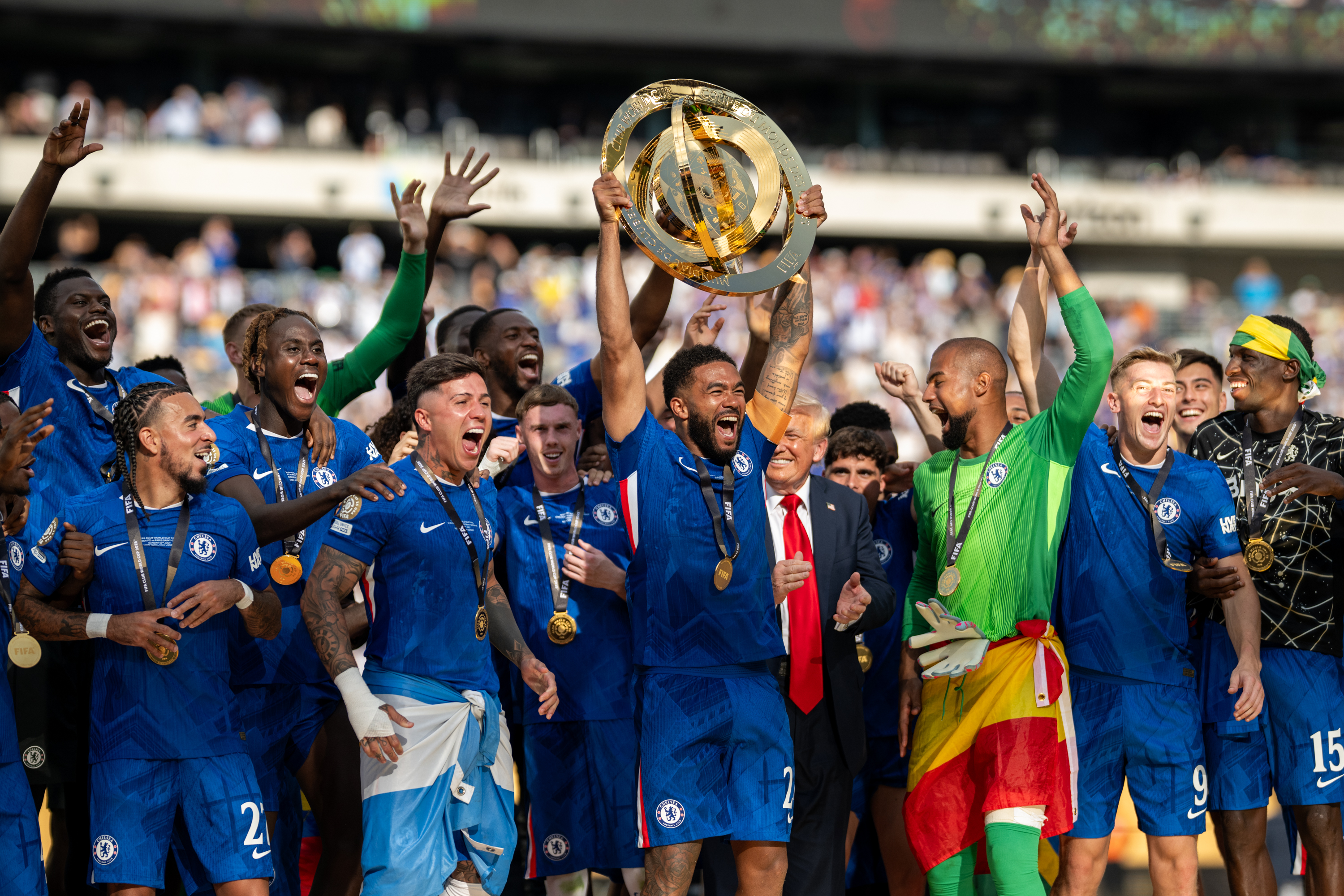
Chelsea captain Reece James lifting the Club World Cup trophy after winning the 2025 edition.

In late 2016, FIFA president Gianni Infantino proposed a significant expansion of the FIFA Club World Cup, suggesting an increase to 32 teams beginning in 2019 and moving the competition to June to align with the international calendar and attract broadcasters and sponsors. By late 2017, the organisation shifted to a revised format, proposing a 24-team tournament held every four years starting in 2021 to replace the FIFA Confederations Cup. The planned lineup included recent winners and runners-up of the UEFA Champions League, UEFA Europa League, and Copa Libertadores, along with qualifiers from other confederations. The proposal projected revenues of $25 billion between 2021 and 2033, including income from a modified UEFA Nations League. However, the COVID-19 pandemic disrupted international football schedules and led to the cancellation of the planned 2021 edition in China.

On 16 December 2022, FIFA confirmed that the Club World Cup would be expanded to 32 teams starting in June 2025. The United States was later announced as the host. The new format consists of eight groups of four teams, with the top two in each group progressing to a knockout stage. The Club World Cup has long featured the continental champions from each confederation and is the only club competition held at the global level. While the previous format did not receive the same media attention as the UEFA Champions League, its competitive standard has been regarded as high.

The 2025 edition received support from some club executives and federation representatives. Bayern Munich CEO Jan-Christian Dreesen described it as the first fully representative Club World Cup and highlighted its international scope. Don Garber, Commissioner of Major League Soccer, stated that the tournament offered greater visibility to North American football. Arsène Wenger, serving as FIFA's Chief of Global Football Development, said that clubs were eager to participate and public interest had been high. The balance of competition has shifted over time, as many of South America's leading players have moved to European clubs, which frequently represent their confederations at the tournament.

The expansion was accompanied by the introduction of an annual FIFA Intercontinental Cup beginning in 2024. For the 2025 Club World Cup, FIFA announced a total prize pool of $1 billion. Some clubs and associations raised concerns regarding the congested calendar, travel requirements, and player workload. Debate also continued around the basis for hosting selections and the commercial direction of the competition. Chelsea won the 2025 edition, defeating Paris Saint-Germain 3–0 in the final to claim the title in the first tournament held under the expanded format.

== Results ==
=== Finals ===
Ed.	Year	Host	Final			Third place game			Num. teams	Ref.
Ed.	Year	Host	Winners	Score	Runners-up	Third place	Score	Fourth place	Num. teams	Ref.
1	2000	Brazil	(Brazil) Corinthians	0–0 (a.e.t.) (4–3 p)	(Brazil) Vasco da Gama	(Mexico) Necaxa	1–1 (a.e.t.) (4–3 p)	(Spain) Real Madrid	8	
—	2001	Spain	Tournament cancelled due to financial difficulties						12	
2	2005	Japan	(Brazil) São Paulo	1–0	(England) Liverpool	(Costa Rica) Saprissa	3–2	(Saudi Arabia) Al-Ittihad	6	
3	2006	Japan	(Brazil) Internacional	1–0	(Spain) Barcelona	(Egypt) Al Ahly	2–1	(Mexico) América	6	
4	2007	Japan	(Italy) AC Milan	4–2	(Argentina) Boca Juniors	(Japan) Urawa Red Diamonds	2–2 (Note: No extra time was played.) (4–2 p)	(Tunisia) Étoile du Sahel	7	
5	2008	Japan	(England) Manchester United	1–0	(Ecuador) LDU Quito	(Japan) Gamba Osaka	1–0	(Mexico) Pachuca	7	
6	2009	United Arab Emirates	(Spain) Barcelona	2–1 (a.e.t.) (Note: Score was 1–1 after 90 minutes.)	(Argentina) Estudiantes	(South Korea) Pohang Steelers	1–1 (4–3 p)	(Mexico) Atlante	7	
7	2010	United Arab Emirates	(Italy) Inter Milan	3–0	(Democratic Republic of the Congo) TP Mazembe	(Brazil) Internacional	4–2	(South Korea) Seongnam Ilhwa Chunma	7	
8	2011	Japan	(Spain) Barcelona	4–0	(Brazil) Santos	(Qatar) Al Sadd	0–0 (5–3 p)	(Japan) Kashiwa Reysol	7	
9	2012	Japan	(Brazil) Corinthians	1–0	(England) Chelsea	(Mexico) Monterrey	2–0	(Egypt) Al Ahly	7	
10	2013	Morocco	(Germany) Bayern Munich	2–0	(Morocco) Raja CA	(Brazil) Atlético Mineiro	3–2	(China) Guangzhou Evergrande	7	
11	2014	Morocco	(Spain) Real Madrid	2–0	(Argentina) San Lorenzo	(New Zealand) Auckland City	1–1 (4–2 p)	(Mexico) Cruz Azul	7	
12	2015	Japan	(Spain) Barcelona	3–0	(Argentina) River Plate	(Japan) Sanfrecce Hiroshima	2–1	(China) Guangzhou Evergrande	7	
13	2016	Japan	(Spain) Real Madrid	4–2 (a.e.t.) (Note: Score was 2–2 after 90 minutes.)	(Japan) Kashima Antlers	(Colombia) Atlético Nacional	2–2 (4–3 p)	(Mexico) América	7	
14	2017	United Arab Emirates	(Spain) Real Madrid	1–0	(Brazil) Grêmio	(Mexico) Pachuca	4–1	(United Arab Emirates) Al-Jazira	7	
15	2018	United Arab Emirates	(Spain) Real Madrid	4–1	(United Arab Emirates) Al-Ain	(Argentina) River Plate	4–0	(Japan) Kashima Antlers	7	
16	2019	Qatar	(England) Liverpool	1–0 (a.e.t.) (Note: Score was 0–0 after 90 minutes.)	(Brazil) Flamengo	(Mexico) Monterrey	2–2 (4–3 p)	(Saudi Arabia) Al-Hilal	7	
17	2020	Qatar	(Germany) Bayern Munich	1–0	(Mexico) UANL	(Egypt) Al Ahly	0–0 (3–2 p)	(Brazil) Palmeiras	6 (Note: A seventh club (Auckland City) had qualified but voluntarily withdrew before the start of the tournament due to impacts from the COVID-19 pandemic.)	
18	2021	United Arab Emirates	(England) Chelsea	2–1 (a.e.t.)	(Brazil) Palmeiras	(Egypt) Al Ahly	4–0	(Saudi Arabia) Al-Hilal	7	
19	2022	Morocco	(Spain) Real Madrid	5–3	(Saudi Arabia) Al-Hilal	(Brazil) Flamengo	4–2	(Egypt) Al Ahly	7	
20	2023	Saudi Arabia	(England) Manchester City	4–0	(Brazil) Fluminense	(Egypt) Al Ahly	4–2	(Japan) Urawa Red Diamonds	7	
21	2025	United States	(England) Chelsea	3–0	(France) Paris Saint-Germain	Losing semi-finalists (Note: No third place play-off match)			32	
21	2025	United States	(England) Chelsea	3–0	(France) Paris Saint-Germain	(Brazil) Fluminense and (Spain) Real Madrid			32	
22	2029	TBD							48	

=== Performances by club ===
Performances in the FIFA Club World Cup by club
Club	Titles	Runners-up	Years won	Years runners-up
(Spain) Real Madrid	5	0	2014, 2016, 2017, 2018, 2022	—
(Spain) Barcelona	3	1	2009, 2011, 2015	2006
(England) Chelsea	2	1	2021, 2025	2012
(Brazil) Corinthians	2	0	2000, 2012	—
(Germany) Bayern Munich	2	0	2013, 2020	—
(England) Liverpool	1	1	2019	2005
(Brazil) São Paulo	1	0	2005	—
(Brazil) Internacional	1	0	2006	—
(Italy) Milan	1	0	2007	—
(England) Manchester United	1	0	2008	—
(Italy) Inter Milan	1	0	2010	—
(England) Manchester City	1	0	2023	—
(Brazil) Vasco da Gama	0	1	—	2000
(Argentina) Boca Juniors	0	1	—	2007
(Ecuador) LDU Quito	0	1	—	2008
(Argentina) Estudiantes	0	1	—	2009
(Democratic Republic of the Congo) TP Mazembe	0	1	—	2010
(Brazil) Santos	0	1	—	2011
(Morocco) Raja CA	0	1	—	2013
(Argentina) San Lorenzo	0	1	—	2014
(Argentina) River Plate	0	1	—	2015
(Japan) Kashima Antlers	0	1	—	2016
(Brazil) Grêmio	0	1	—	2017
(United Arab Emirates) Al-Ain	0	1	—	2018
(Brazil) Flamengo	0	1	—	2019
(Mexico) UANL	0	1	—	2020
(Brazil) Palmeiras	0	1	—	2021
(Saudi Arabia) Al-Hilal	0	1	—	2022
(Brazil) Fluminense	0	1	—	2023
(France) Paris Saint-Germain	0	1	—	2025

=== Performances by country ===
Country	Titles	Runners-up	Years won	Years runners-up
Spain	8	1	2009, 2011, 2014, 2015, 2016, 2017, 2018, 2022	2006
England	5	2	2008, 2019, 2021, 2023, 2025	2005, 2012
Brazil	4	6	2000, 2005, 2006, 2012	2000, 2011, 2017, 2019, 2021, 2023
Italy	2	0	2007, 2010	—
Germany	2	0	2013, 2020	—
Argentina	0	4	—	2007, 2009, 2014, 2015
Ecuador	0	1	—	2008
DR Congo	0	1	—	2010
Morocco	0	1	—	2013
Japan	0	1	—	2016
United Arab Emirates	0	1	—	2018
Mexico	0	1	—	2020
Saudi Arabia	0	1	—	2022
France	0	1	—	2025

=== Performances by confederation ===
Africa's best representatives were TP Mazembe from the Democratic Republic of the Congo and Moroccan club Raja CA, which finished second in 2010 and 2013, respectively. Asia's best representatives were Kashima Antlers from Japan, Al-Ain from the United Arab Emirates and Al-Hilal from Saudi Arabia, finishing second in 2016, 2018 and 2022, respectively. North America's best result was Mexican team UANL, which earned a second-place finish in 2020. These six clubs are the only sides from outside Europe and South America to reach the final.

Auckland City from New Zealand earned third place in 2014, the only time to date that an Oceanian team reached the semi-finals of the tournament.

Confederation	Winners	Runners-up	Third place
UEFA	17	4	—
CONMEBOL	4	11	5
AFC	—	3	5
CAF	—	2	4
CONCACAF	—	1	5
OFC	—	—	1
Total	21	21	20

== Format and rules ==
Before the 2025 edition, most teams qualified to the FIFA Club World Cup by winning their continental competitions, be it the AFC Champions League, CAF Champions League, CONCACAF Champions League, Copa Libertadores, OFC Champions League or UEFA Champions League. Aside from these, the host nation's national league champions qualified as well.

As of 2025, there are eight groups of four teams in the group stage. Standard rules apply, with each team in a group playing the other three, and earning three points for each win, one point for a draw and no points for a loss. The top two teams in each group qualify for the play-offs. In the case of a tie on points, the number of points scored in matches between the tied teams is used, then the goal difference between the tied teams and finally the number of goals scored between the tied teams. If this does not break the tie, additional rules are applied.

The maiden edition of the competition was separated into two rounds. The eight participants were split into two groups of four teams. The winner of each group met in the final while the runners-up played for third place. The competition changed its format during the 2005 relaunch into a single-elimination tournament in which teams played each other in one-off matches, with extra time and penalty shoot-out used to decide the winner if necessary. It featured seven clubs competing over a two-week period. There were four stages: the first round, the second round, the semi-final round and the final. In the first round, the host nation's club played against the Oceanian Champions League representative. The winner advanced to the second round, where it was joined by the African Champions League winners, the Asian Champions League winners and the North American Champions League winners. Afterwards, the winners of those games advanced to the semi-finals and played the European Champions League winners and South America's Copa Libertadores winners. The winners of each semi-final advanced to the final. With the introduction of this format, a fifth-place match was added, but was abolished after the 2021 edition. A third-place match was abolished after the 2023 edition.

== Trophy ==
FIFA Club World Cup trophies

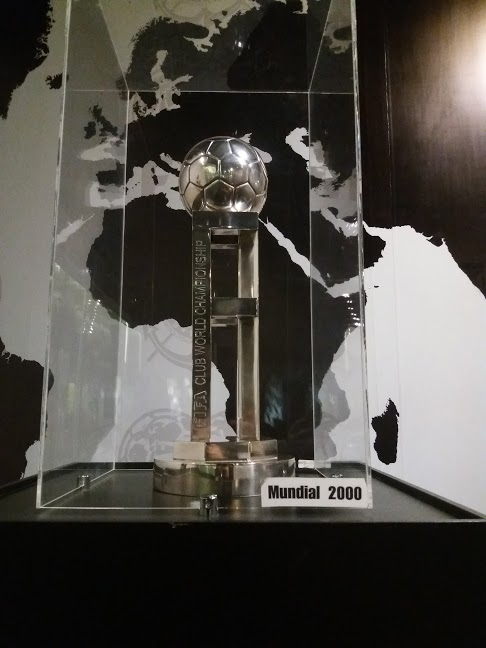
FIFA Club World Championship Cup (2000)

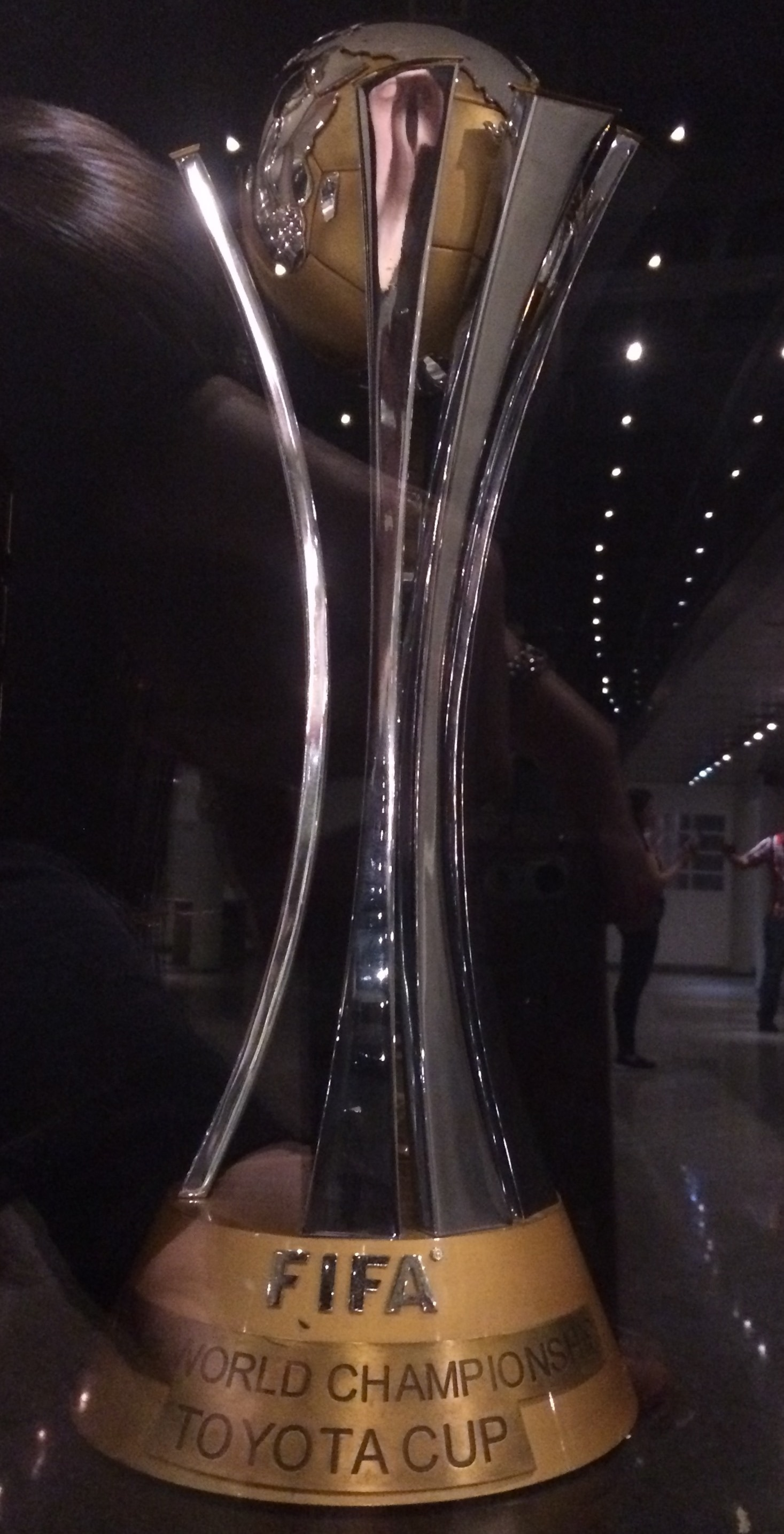
FIFA Club World Cup (2005–2023)

The trophy used during the inaugural competition was called the FIFA Club World Championship Cup. The original laurel was created by Sawaya & Moroni, an Italian designer company that produces contemporary designs with cultural backgrounds and design concepts. The designing firm is based in Milan. The fully silver-coloured trophy had a weight of 4 kg (8.8 lb) and a height of 37.5 cm (14.8 in). Its base and widest points are 10 cm (3.9 in) long. The trophy had a base of two pedestals which had four rectangular pillars. Two of the four pillars had inscriptions on them; one contained the phrase, "FIFA Club World Championship" imprinted across. The other had the letters "FIFA" inscribed on it. On top, a football based on the 1998 FIFA World Cup ball, the Adidas Tricolore, can be seen. The production costs of the laurel was US$25,000. It was presented for the first time at Sheraton Hotels and Resorts in Rio de Janeiro on 4 January 2000.

Just as the [FIFA] women's [World Cup] trophy had a distinct feminine note to it, so this new trophy is more masculine. It is also inspired by a classic sense of geometry and architecture, enduring concepts just like the status of a World Champion.

— William Sawaya, designer of the FIFA Club World Championship trophy, commenting on the laurel; Fédération Internationale de Football Association, 3 January 2000.

The tournament, in its second format, shared its name with the second trophy, also called the FIFA Club World Cup or simply la Copa, which was awarded to the FIFA Club World Cup winner. It was unveiled at Tokyo on 30 July 2005 during the draw of that year's edition of the competition. The laurel was designed in 2005 in Birmingham, United Kingdom, at Thomas Fattorini Ltd, by English designer Jane Powell, alongside her assistant Dawn Forbes, at the behest of FIFA. The gold-and-silver-coloured trophy, weighing 5.2 kg (11 lb), had a height of 50 cm (20 in). Its base and widest points were also measured at exactly 20 cm (7.9 in). It was made out of a combination of brass, copper, sterling silver, gilding metal, aluminium, chrome and rhodium. The trophy itself was gold plated.

The design, according to FIFA, showed six staggered pillars, representing the six participating teams from the respective six confederations, and one separate metal structure referencing the winner of the competition. They held up a globe in the shape of a football – a consistent feature in almost all of FIFA's trophies. The golden pedestal had the phrase, "FIFA Club World Cup", imprinted at the bottom.

As part of the expansion of the tournament to 32 teams, a new trophy was created in collaboration with global luxury jeweller Tiffany & Co. and unveiled on 14 November 2024. Worth around US$230,000, the new trophy features a 24-karat gold-plated finish, intricate laser-engraved inscriptions on both sides including a world map and the names of all 211 FIFA member associations and the six confederations, icons that capture football's traditions, including symbols of stadiums and equipment, and engravings in 13 languages and braille. Space is available to laser-engrave the emblems of the winning clubs for 24 editions of the tournament. The trophy can transform from a shield into a multifaceted and orbital structure. The design was inspired by the Voyager Golden Records. After FIFA handed the trophy over to US President Donald Trump for custody, he elected to keep it installed in the Oval Office, and FIFA presented the competition winners with a replica.

== Awards ==
At the end of each Club World Cup, awards are presented to the players and teams for accomplishments other than their final team positions in the tournament. There are currently three awards:

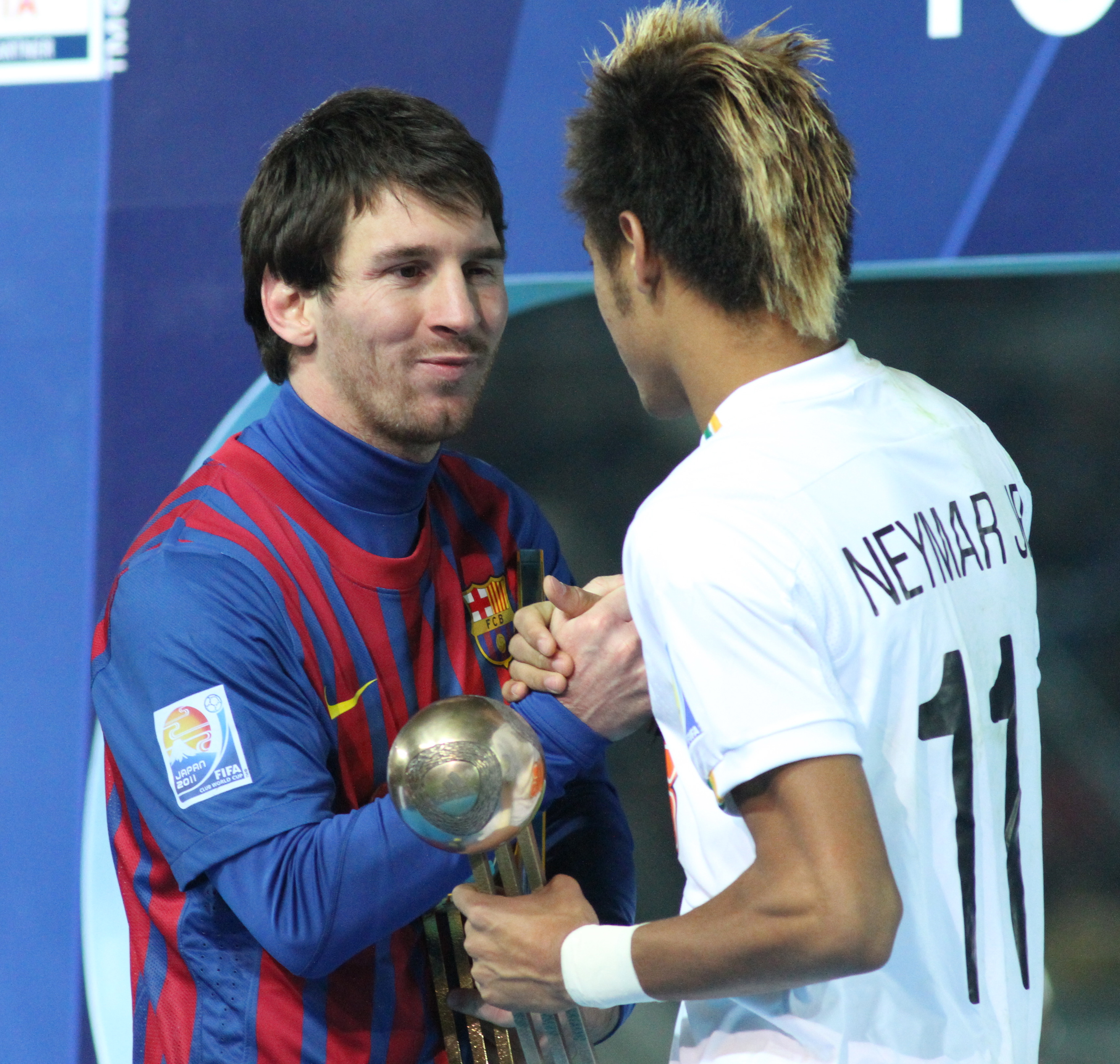
Lionel Messi with the Golden Ball greets Bronze Ball recipient Neymar after the 2011 final.

- The Golden Ball for the best player, determined by a vote of media members, who is also awarded the Alibaba Cloud Award (the presenting sponsor of the FIFA Club World Cup); the Silver Ball and the Bronze Ball are awarded to the players finishing second and third in the voting respectively.
- The Player of the Match (formerly known as the "Man of the Match") for the best performing player in each tournament match. It was first awarded in 2013.
- The FIFA Fair Play Trophy for the team with the best fair play record, according to the points system and criteria established by the FIFA Fair Play Committee.

The winners of the competition are also entitled to receive the FIFA Champions Badge; it features an image of the trophy, which the reigning champion is entitled to display on its first-team kit only, up until and including, the final of the next championship. The first edition of the badge was presented to Milan, the winners of the 2007 final. All four previous champions were allowed to wear the badge until the 2008 final, where Manchester United gained the sole right to wear the badge by winning the trophy.

Each tournament's top three teams receives a set of gold, silver or bronze medals to distribute to their players.

== Prize money ==
Sporting performance pillar in 2025 (USD)
Winners	$40 million
Runners-up	$30 million
Semi-final	$21 million
Quarter-final	$13.125 million
Round of 16	$7.5 million
Group stage	$2 million per win $1 million per draw

The 2000 FIFA Club World Championship marked the inaugural edition of the tournament and offered a total prize pool of US$28 million. Prize money was distributed based on participation and final placement. Clubs finishing between fifth and eighth place received US$2.5 million each. The fourth-placed team was awarded US$3 million, the third-placed team received US$4 million, the runners-up earned US$5 million, and the champions took home US$6 million.

When the tournament was relaunched in the 2005 edition, both the total prize money and distribution structure were revised. The overall prize pool was reduced to US$16 million. The winners received US$5 million, runners-up earned US$4 million, third place received US$2.5 million, and fourth place took US$2 million. Fifth and sixth places were awarded US$1.5 million and US$1 million respectively.

For the 2007 FIFA Club World Cup, a play-off match was introduced between the OFC champions and the host nation's league champions for a place in the quarter-finals, aiming to boost local interest. The match for fifth place was reinstated in the 2008 edition, prompting a US$500,000 increase in total prize money, raising the pool to US$16.5 million.

The revamped 2025 edition featured a major increase in financial rewards, with a record prize pool of US$1 billion. The champions are expected to receive up to US$125 million.

== Sponsorship ==
Like the FIFA World Cup, the FIFA Club World Cup is sponsored by a consortium of multinational corporations. Toyota Motor Corporation, a Japanese automaker headquartered in Toyota, Aichi, served as the Presenting Partner of the competition until the end of December 2014, when its sponsorship agreement expired and was not renewed. In 2015, Alibaba Group signed an eight-year agreement to take over as Presenting Partner of the tournament. The inaugural edition of the competition, held in 2000, featured six official sponsors: Fujifilm, Hyundai, JVC, McDonald's, Budweiser and MasterCard.

In June 2025, the Public Investment Fund (PIF) of Saudi Arabia became an official partner of the Club World Cup, joining a growing list of multinational sponsors that included Adidas, Anheuser-Busch InBev, Bank of America, Coca-Cola, Hisense, Lenovo and Qatar Airways. While FIFA enforces sponsorship guidelines during the competition, individual clubs are permitted to wear jerseys featuring their own commercial partners, even when these conflict with official tournament sponsors. However, only one main sponsor may appear on each jersey in addition to the logo of the kit manufacturer.

== Records and statistics ==
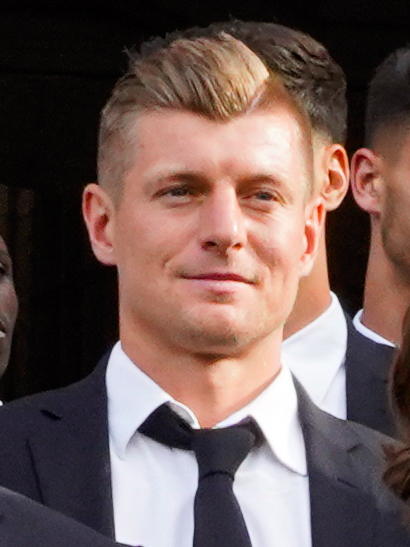
Toni Kroos is the only player who has won the tournament six times.

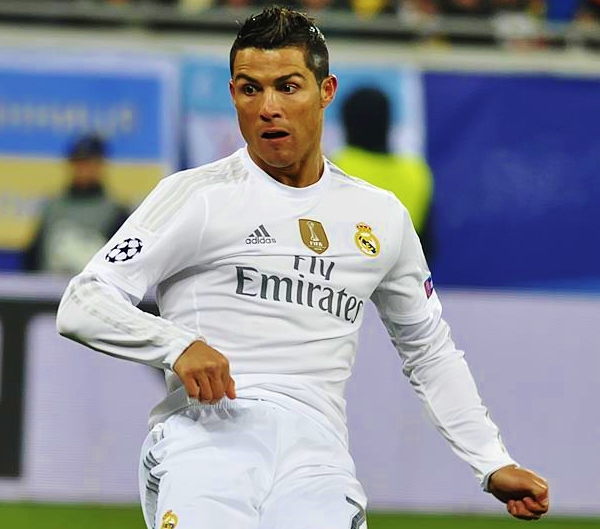
Cristiano Ronaldo (pictured in 2015 wearing a Real Madrid kit with the gold FIFA Champions Badge) is the all-time leading goalscorer in the tournament.

Toni Kroos has won the FIFA Club World Cup six times, the most titles for any player. Cristiano Ronaldo is the overall top scorer in FIFA Club World Cup history, with seven goals. Hussein El Shahat has made the most appearances in the competition, with eighteen.

Real Madrid have won the FIFA Club World Cup a record five times. They also have the most wins (16) and most total goals scored in the competition (51). Auckland City have participated in the most editions of the tournament (12), while Al Ahly have played the most overall matches (28).

== Official songs ==
The FIFA Club World Cup has featured official songs for each tournament since 2005.

List of FIFA Club World Cup official songs and anthems
Year	Hosts	Official songs/anthems	Language(s)	Performer(s)
2005	Japan	"Legendary Meadow"	Japanese	Chemistry
2006	Japan	"Top of the World"	Japanese	Chemistry
2007	Japan	"Shining Night"	Japanese	Chemistry (supported by Monkey Majik)
2008	Japan	"Septenova"	English and Japanese	Gospellers vs. Shintaro Tokita (from Sukima Switch)
2009	UAE	"The River Sings"	Loxian	Enya
2010	UAE			
2011	Japan	"Never Give Up"	Japanese	Kylee
2012	Japan	"World Quest"	Japanese	NEWS
2013	Morocco	"Seven Colors"	English and Japanese	NEWS
2014	Morocco	"Seven Colors"	English and Japanese	NEWS
2014	Morocco	"Come Alive"	English	RedOne feat. Chawki
2015	Japan	"Anthem"	English	NEWS
2016	Japan	"Anthem"	English	NEWS
2017	UAE	"Kingdom"	English and Japanese	NEWS
2018	UAE	"Spirit"	Japanese	NEWS
2019	Qatar	"Superstar"	Japanese	NEWS
2022	Morocco	"Welcome To Morocco"	English and Arabic	RedOne, Douzi, Hatim Ammor, Asma Lamnawar, Rym, Aminux, Nouaman Belaiachi, Zouhair Bahaoui, Dizzy DROS
2023	Saudi Arabia	"It's On"	English	Bebe Rexha, RedOne
2025	United States	"We Will Rock You"	English	Pitbull feat. RedOne

== See also ==
- List of association football competitions
- List of football clubs by competitive honours won
- FIFA Women's Club World Cup
