= Ten Millennia =

British band 2016–present

- Origin: York, England
- Genres: Soul
- Years active: 2015–present
- Members: Rosie; Russell Henderson; Rich Jevons; Wayne Pollock; Colin Sutton; Julian Richer

Ten Millennia are an English soul band established in 2016 in Yorkshire, England. The band consists of vocalist Rosie, keyboard player Wayne Pollock, guitarist Rich Jevons and Colin Sutton, saxophone player Russell Henderson and drummer Julian Richer. Richer is also the founder of the retail chain Richer Sounds.

== Discography ==
Their debut album, Ten Millennia, was released on 7 July 2017. It was produced by Andy Wright. The album reached number 12 in the Official Independent Album Chart, number 4 on the Official Independent Breakers Chart and number 23 on the Official Record Store Chart.

The band's second album, Love Won't Wait, again produced by Andy Wright, was released on 17 August 2018 and made number 36 on the UK Albums Chart.

== Live performances ==
Ten Millennia have performed with The Corrs at Kew Gardens in July 2016, and Jools Holland's Rhythm and Blues Orchestra on over 13 occasions, including Scarborough, Harrogate, York, in 2016, Brussels in March 2017, Carlisle and Edinburgh Jazz and Blues festival in July 2017, as well November 30 at The Albert Hall. They have also performed with Shakin' Stevens in Worthing and Scunthorpe in April/May 2017. and Texas (band).

In July 2018, the band performed the main stage at The Cornbury Music Festival.
