= FIFA Champions Badge =

Emblem for FIFA national and club world champions

The golden version of the badge awarded to the national team that wins the FIFA World Cup (since 2008)

The badge awarded to the club that won the FIFA Club World Cup (2010–2025)

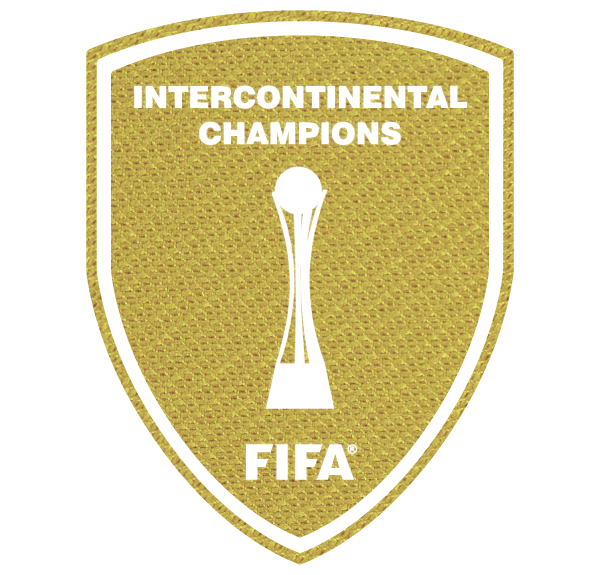
The badge awarded to the club that wins the FIFA Intercontinental Cup (since 2024)

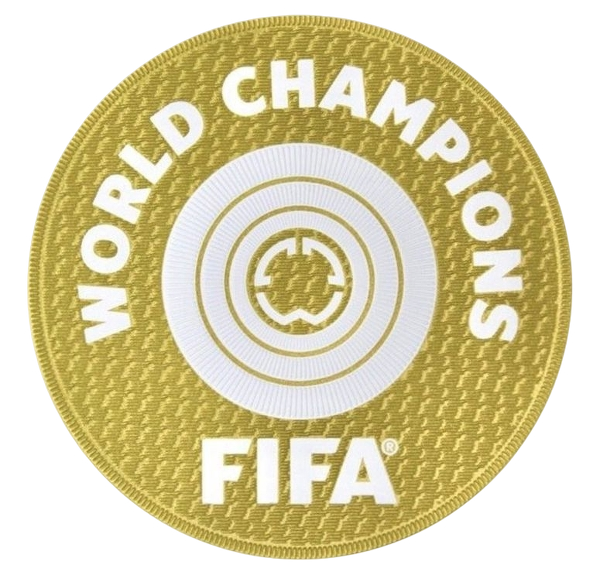
The badge awarded to the club that wins the FIFA Club World Cup (since 2025)

The FIFA Champions Badge is a kit emblem in the shape of a gold and white shield, awarded by FIFA to the reigning world champions of FIFA competitions, both at national team level (e.g. World Cup, Women's World Cup, Futsal World Cup and Beach Soccer World Cup) and at club team level (e.g. Club World Cup, Intercontinental Cup and Women's Champions Cup).

FIFA owns, produces and licenses the physical badge, which may only be worn on the first-team kits of the reigning title holders and is therefore considered a temporary honour that expires when a new winner is crowned. The badge cannot be used on replica kits or training apparel. The first badge was awarded in February 2008 to Milan, who were the reigning club world champions at the time, having won the 2007 FIFA Club World Cup.

== Award ==
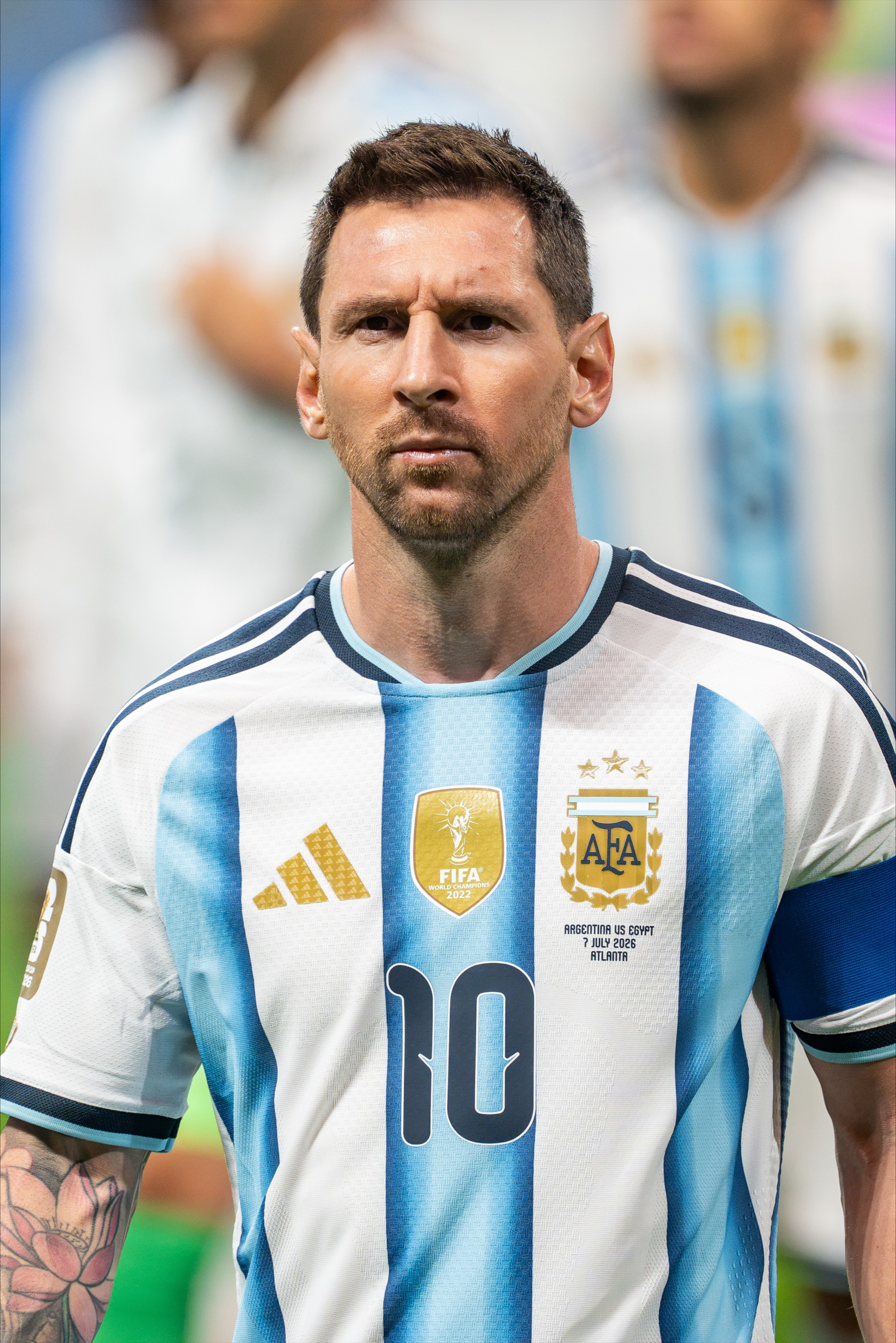
Lionel Messi wears the FIFA Champions Badge on his Argentina national football team kit in 2026, after his nation won the 2022 FIFA World Cup.

=== Badge rules ===
The 78 by 58 mm (3.1 by 2.3 in) badge is shaped like a shield, (Note: The "2015 FIFA Equipment Regulations" notes that the dimensions are 80 by 55 mm (3.1 by 2.2 in), but notes that FIFA can change the dimensions at its discretion.) and displays the image of the relevant trophy, with the inscription FIFA WORLD CHAMPIONS, next to the year in which the relevant FIFA competition had been won. Due to the creation of the FIFA Intercontinental Cup, a new variation was introduced for the teams who won the competition, featuring the inscription FIFA INTERCONTINENTAL CHAMPIONS. The badge only comes in two colour schemes – gold letters on a white background, and white letters on a gold background. The winning national team or club team carries the badge on their shirt until the end of the next edition of the relevant FIFA tournament; thus, it is only worn by reigning champions.

The badge can be displayed on kits from the day the team becomes FIFA world champions, up to and including the day of the final of the next staging of the competition (e.g. if the team wins the competition again, they can hold the badge uninterrupted). The badge can only be worn on the club's official first-team kits (both home and away versions) – being the team that won the relevant FIFA world competition – and cannot be worn on any derivative or retrospective form of these kits, or on any related club training clothing, or by the club's reserve teams/any other of the club's teams.

=== Commercial aspects ===
The physical badge is manufactured by a third party on behalf of FIFA (by Unisport in 2019), and orders for the physical badge from kit manufacturers must go through FIFA; a logistical situation that created delays in consumers being able to purchase Nike-made kits of the United States women's national soccer team (USWNT) with the badge in 2019. There have also been concerns that major kit manufacturers such as Nike and Puma, have had issues licensing the FIFA Champions Badge for first-team kits that can be sold to the general public.

As well as the prestige, the award brings commercial benefits to the recipients through sales of kits that include the new FIFA badge.

=== Non-FIFA competitions ===
A separate agreement is required to wear the badge in a non-FIFA organised competition. For example, in 2009, the English FA granted Manchester United, the reigning 2008 FIFA Club World Cup holders, permission to wear the badge during FA Cup fixtures — despite eventually never doing it — but not in the Premier League as it contravened their advertising regulations. A similar arrangement was sought for Liverpool when they became 2019 holders, but the League did grant the club the right to use the badge for one home fixture, against Wolverhampton Wanderers on 29 December 2019 (their first home match after becoming world champions). In both cases, they were allowed to wear that badge in continental European competitions. In contrast, both Real Madrid and Barcelona were allowed to wear the FIFA Champions Badge on their shirts during all of their Spanish La Liga fixtures. Manchester City, following their success in 2023, were granted permission by the Premier League to wear the badge for the remainder of the 2023–24 season. Following a special request made to the Premier League, Manchester City were permitted to also wear the badge for the entire 2024–25 season. Paris Saint-Germain, the reigning 2025 FIFA Intercontinental champions, were not allowed to wear the FIFA badge in Ligue 1 and in the French Cup. Since club jerseys were produced by the French Football Federation, only the French Cup badge was permitted on the jersey.

== History ==
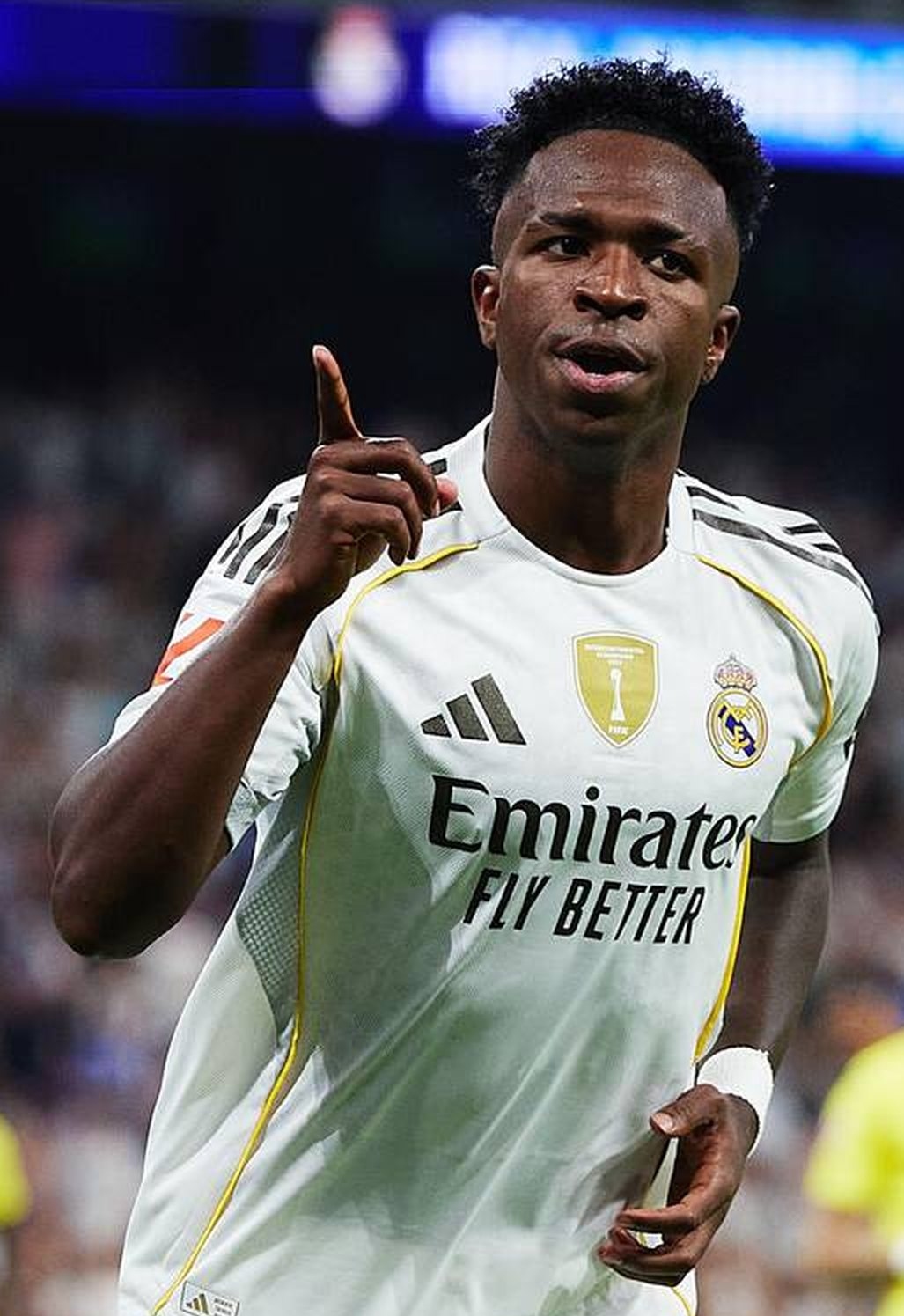
Vinícius Júnior wears the FIFA Champions Badge on his Real Madrid kit in 2025, after his club won the 2024 FIFA Intercontinental Cup.

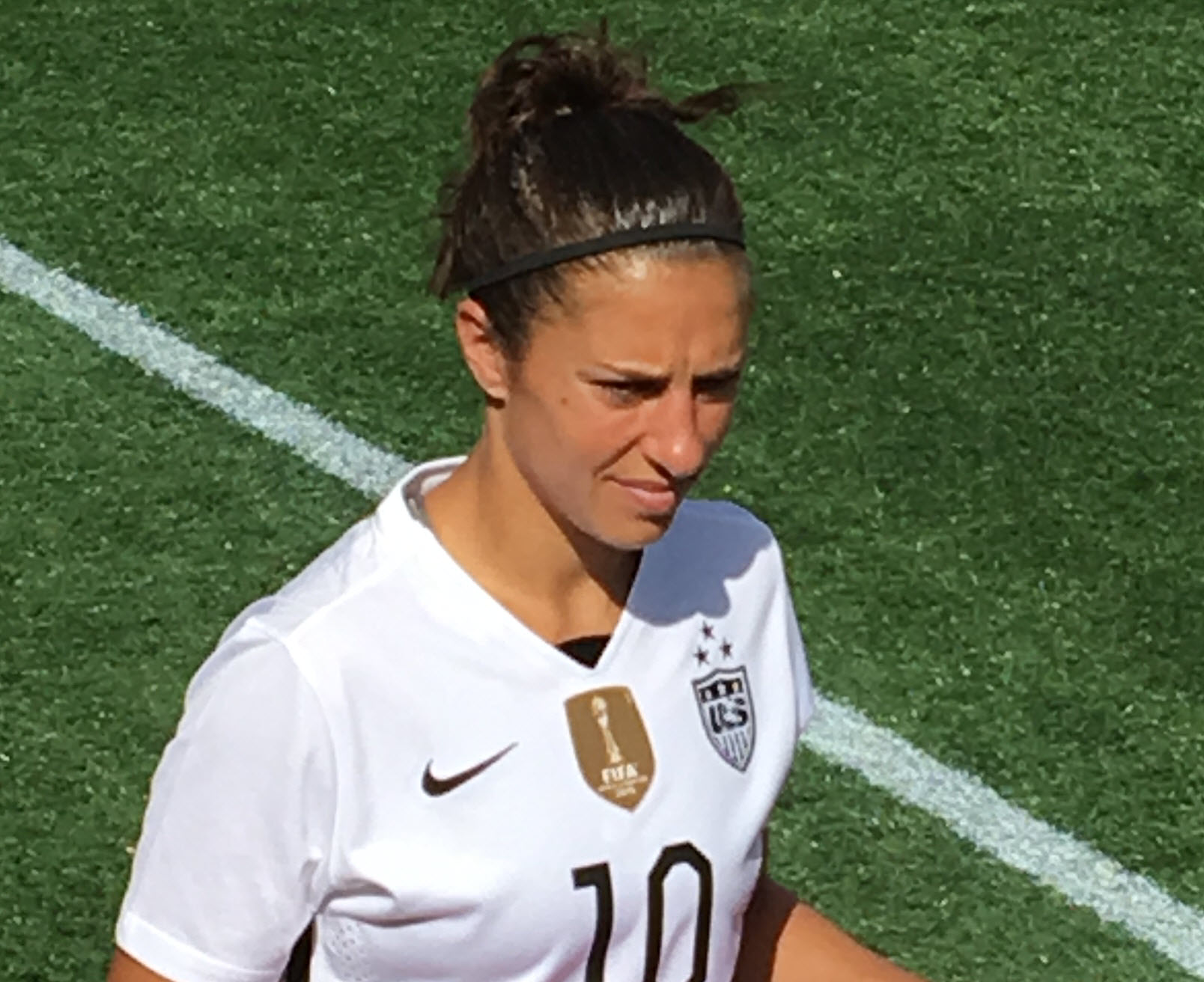
Carli Lloyd wears the FIFA Champions Badge on her United States women's national soccer team kit; the U.S. women's team has held the award from 5 July 2015 – 20 August 2023, a national team record.

=== Club teams ===
The first official award of the badge was made in February 2008 to honour the reigning holders of the FIFA Club World Cup, Italian club Milan, who had won the title in 2007. At the time of the award to Milan, FIFA declared that the three previous winners of the FIFA Club World Cup, Corinthians, São Paulo, and Internacional, could also wear the badge until a new winner was crowned in the 2008 FIFA Club World Cup final in December. However, when Corinthians won the badge in the 2012 FIFA Club World Cup, FIFA confirmed that it was their first time officially earning the FIFA Champions Badge outright. In 2025, the badge was extended to the FIFA Intercontinental Cup and awarded to Real Madrid, winners of its inaugural edition. The following year, the badge was also extended to the FIFA Women's Champions Cup, where it was first won by Arsenal.

=== National teams ===
In September 2008, the badge was extended to the FIFA World Cup and was presented to the defending champions from 2006, Italy, thus becoming the first national team to wear the badge. (Note: Even though FIFA presented Milan with the first "Champions Badge" seven months earlier in February 2008 as titleholders of the 2007 Club World Cup, because Italy were the reigning champions from the earlier 2006 World Cup, sometimes FIFA refers to Italy as being the "first recipient" of the badge in various press releases.) In 2009, the badge was extended to the FIFA Women's World Cup and awarded to Germany, reigning champions from 2007. The badge was further extended to the FIFA Futsal World Cup in 2012, where it was first won by Brazil. In 2013, the badge was added to the FIFA Beach Soccer World Cup, being first worn by Russia.

The badge has yet to be added for any of FIFA's age-grade world championships—the U-17 and U-20 World Cups for men and women, the men's Olympic soccer tournament (U-23 with three over-age players allowed per squad), and the men's and women's Youth Olympic futsal tournaments (U-20).

== Records ==
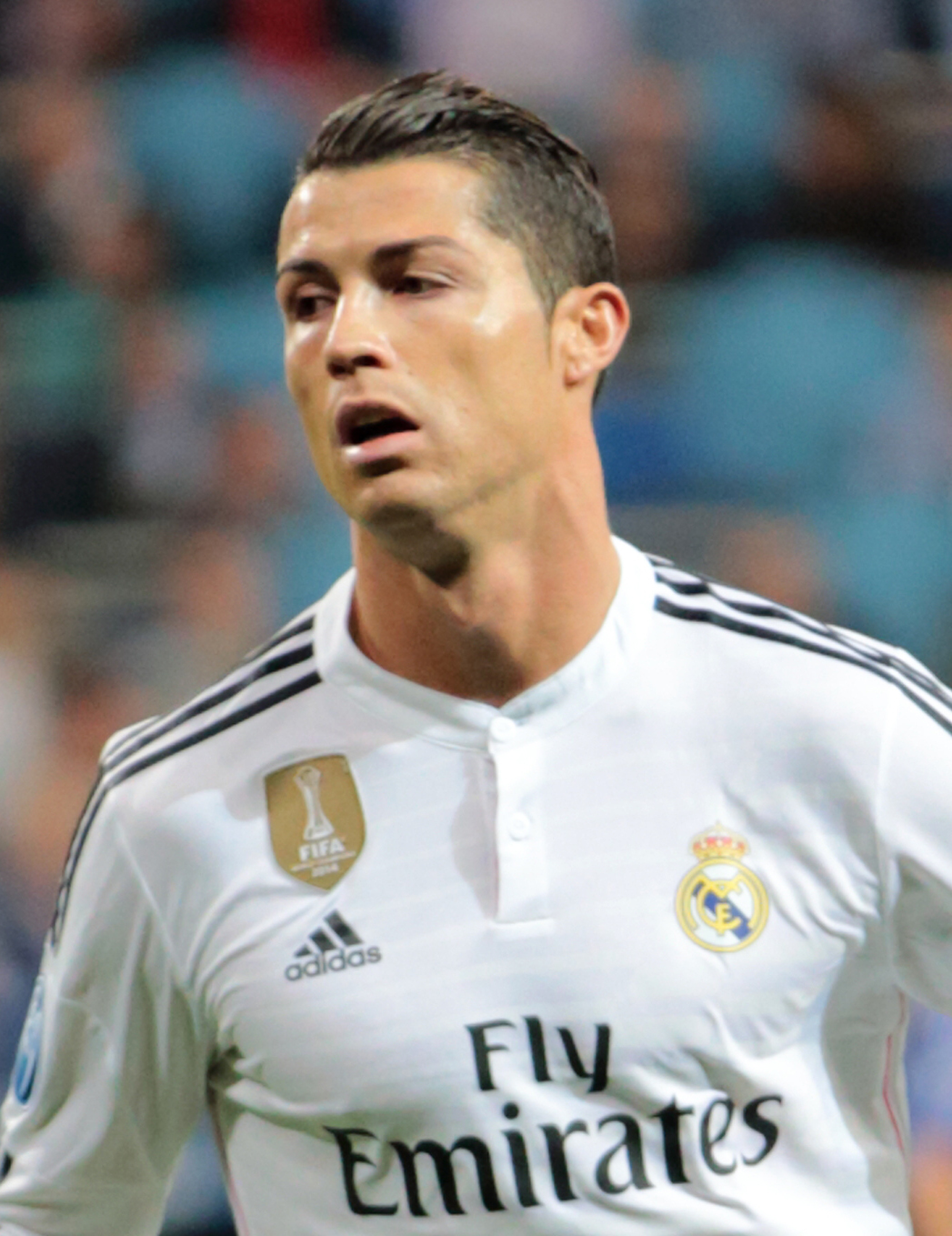
Cristiano Ronaldo wears the FIFA Champions Badge (upper left) on his Real Madrid kit. Real held the FIFA badge continuously for 1,098 days, a record for any club team.

As of February 2023, the following records apply:

=== Continuous periods ===
- On 22 December 2019, Liverpool ended Real Madrid’s uninterrupted reign as FIFA Club World Cup Champions Badge holders that lasted 1,098 days from 18 December 2016; it was noted as the longest continuous period for which any club team had held a FIFA Champions Badge.
- The United States women's national soccer team won the 2019 FIFA Women's World Cup, and was thus able to keep a FIFA World Cup Champions Badge uninterrupted since 5 July 2015, when they won the 2015 World Cup until the end of the 2023 World Cup; this was the longest continuous period for which any national team has held a FIFA Champions Badge (no other national team has yet won the badge twice in succession).

=== Most wins ===
- For club teams, Real Madrid has won the right to wear the badge on five occasions, while Barcelona has won the right three times.
- For national football teams, the United States women's team and Spain men's team have won the right to wear the badge on two occasions.
- For other national teams, the Brazil beach soccer and futsal teams have won the right thrice and twice respectively.

== National team winners ==
=== Association football ===
Male

Year	Team
2006	Italy
2010	Spain
2014	Germany
2018	France
2022	Argentina
2026	Spain

Female

Year	Team
2007	Germany
2011	Japan
2015	United States
2019	United States
2023	Spain

=== Futsal ===
Male

Year	Team
2012	Brazil
2016	Argentina
2021	Portugal
2024	Brazil

=== Beach soccer ===
Male

Year	Team
2013	Russia
2015	Portugal
2017	Brazil
2019	Portugal
2021	Russia
2024	Brazil
2025	Brazil

== Club team winners ==
Male

Year	Club
2007	(Italy) Milan (Note: At the time of the award to Milan, FIFA declared that the three previous winners of the FIFA World Club Cup, Corinthians, São Paulo, and Internacional, could also wear the badge until a new winner was crowned in the December 2008 Club World Cup final; however, when Corinthians won the badge in the 2012 FIFA Club World Cup, FIFA confirmed that it was their first time officially winning the FIFA Champions Badge stating: "Newly-crowned FIFA Club World Cup Champions Corinthians are the latest member of the exclusive group of football teams who have the honour of wearing the FIFA World Champions Badge".)
2008	(England) Manchester United
2009	(Spain) Barcelona
2010	(Italy) Inter Milan
2011	(Spain) Barcelona
2012	(Brazil) Corinthians
2013	(Germany) Bayern Munich
2014	(Spain) Real Madrid
2015	(Spain) Barcelona
2016	(Spain) Real Madrid
2017	(Spain) Real Madrid
2018	(Spain) Real Madrid
2019	(England) Liverpool
2020	(Germany) Bayern Munich
2021	(England) Chelsea
2022	(Spain) Real Madrid
2023	(England) Manchester City
2024	(Spain) Real Madrid
2025	(England) Chelsea
2025	(France) Paris Saint-Germain

Female

Year	Club
2026	(England) Arsenal

== See also ==
- Scudetto
- The Best FIFA Football Awards
- FIFA Club World Cup awards
- Star (sport badge)
