= Richer Unsigned =

Richer Unsigned was set up by hi-fi and TV retail entrepreneur Julian Richer in 2014 as a not for profit organisation to support and promote musicians who may just be getting started, who have been in the industry a while or simply don't have a great label deal. Richer Unsigned is based in London. The project is open to all musicians making original music in the UK and features over 3000 bands and artists all of whom have signed up free of charge to have their music available via the site. The organisation’s site www.RicherUnsigned.com promotes curated playlists chosen monthly by established artists, celebrities and industry taste-makers. Past curators include Jack Savoretti, Newton Faulkner, Alice Levine, The Great Escape Festival, Radio X, Absolute Radio, Vevo, Fender, Marshall and many more. These playlists are played and advertised in Richer Sounds stores across the UK, given exposure to over 1 million Richer Sounds VIP club members as well as being promoted via QTheMusic.com and social media. Play-listed artists also have the opportunity to perform at a range of live events arranged and coordinated by Richer Unsigned.

In May 2016, Richer Unsigned teamed up with turntable manufacturer Pro-Ject to release 'The Best of Richer Unsigned', a vinyl curated by BBC Radio 1 DJ Alice Levine in celebration of Record Store Day. The album featured 10 unsigned artists and were given away in Richer Sounds shops across the UK, Sister Ray records and in a boutique pop-up shop on Berwick Street, Soho.

In June 2016, Richer Unsigned teamed up with Samsung for an event with platinum selling artist Newton Faulkner. 2 bands from Newton Faulkner's June Richer Unsigned playlist were chosen by the artist to open for him at The Hospital Club, London. London band Victoria and Norwich based Jess Morgan were selected as opening acts on the evening which saw an audience made up of press, music industry and competition winners.

In January 2017, Richer Unsigned launched the Richer Unsigned Sessions at Cambridge Audio's venue 'Melomania'. Each event features 2 bands who perform a short set to a mixture of staff and industry guests. The sessions are recorded and filmed. The audio is mixed by Emre Ramazanoglu (Noel Gallagher, Rita Ora, Sia) and content is shared on the Richer Unsigned YouTube channel. The videos are also played in Richer Sounds stores across the UK.

In April 2017 and 2018 Richer Unsigned teamed up with Technics to release their second and third vinyl album 'The Best Of Richer Unsigned' in celebration of Record Store Day. Each album featured 10 emerging artists from around the world, chosen by Ivor Novello nominated Folk band Bear's Den and platinum selling artist Newton Faulkner. 3 artists were then chosen by each curator to support them at an intimate concert at St Giles In The Fields Church in 2018 (Bear's Den), and St Pancras Church in 2019 (Newton Faulkner). Each release was in conjunction with Dave Stewart Entertainment's new 'Church Keys' initiative.

Since 2014 Richer Unsigned has pioneered a 'Musicians minimum wage' initiative, where every performing band member at a Richer Unsigned event receives at least the living wage. The idea is to lead by example, rewarding artists for their talent and investing in their careers.

In 2018 Richer Unsigned sponsored a stage at Cornbury Music Festival featuring 15 new artists. Each artist received a professionally filmed video and audio mix of their performance. All videos were promoted across Richer Sounds channels.
