= Parallel Histories =

British educational charity

Parallel Histories is an educational charity, registered with the Charity Commission for England and Wales. It promotes the teaching of controversial history in secondary schools through the use of a dual-narrative methodology. In 2024, it was chosen by The Guardian and The Observer, along with War Child and Médecins Sans Frontières, for the Guardian and Observer Charity Appeal.

== History ==
Michael Davies and Julian Richer founded Parallel Histories in 2017. The genesis came from a school trip, led by Michael Davies, to Israel and the West Bank. With the support of a Winston Churchill Memorial Trust, Michael Davies developed the dual-narrative methodology for teaching controversial historical topics, drawing inspiration from Side by Side: Parallel Histories of Israel-Palestine, a book edited by Dan Bar-On, Sami Adwan and Eyal Naveh. Michael Davies and Julian Richer founded Parallel Histories to promote the use of the dual-narrative methodology in schools.

Michael Davies led Parallel Histories until his death in 2024. Bill Rammell, previously Minister of State for Higher Education and Vice-Chancellor for the University of Bedfordshire, succeeded as CEO.

In addition to its work in the United Kingdom, Parallel Histories began partnering with Virginia Tech in 2022 to bring its methodology to schools in the United States of America.

== Activities ==
Parallel Histories publishes educational resources for teachers and students on controversial historical topics including the Israel-Palestine conflict, conflict in Northern Ireland, and controversial historical individuals.

Parallel Histories also runs debating workshops bringing together young people from different backgrounds to debate different perspectives on controversial history. It marks Good Relations Week in Northern Ireland through running debating workshops on the history of Northern Ireland in Parliament Buildings, Stormont.

== Partnerships ==
Pearson partnered with Parallel Histories to encourage more schools to teach Middle East history. Together, they produced resources, using the dual-narrative methodology, for the GCSE and iGCSE qualifications.

Parallel Histories' partnerships to run programmes with schools include with: PwC; the Prince's Teaching Institute (PTI); Christ Church, the University of Oxford; the veterans' charity, Forward Assist; and the Naval Children's Charity. It also participated in the Erasmus+ programme with schools in the United Kingdom, France, Germany, Belgium and Denmark.

Parallel Histories is a member of the Good Business Charter.
