= Zero Hours Justice =

United Kingdom political campaign

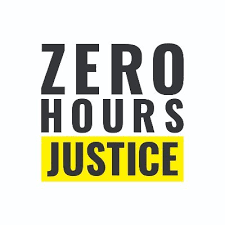
- Location: United Kingdom
- Founder: Julian Richer
- Leader: Ian Hodson
- Website: https://www.zerohoursjustice.org/

Zero Hours Justice is a non-party political campaign that aims at regulating fair working practices in the UK, concentrating on eradicating zero-hour contracts. This campaign is backed by the Trades Union Congress (TUC). The organisation was recognised and supported by an Early Day Motion in Parliament.

== History ==
Zero Hours Justice was created by a coalition of concerned citizens in response to the financial and emotional effect of zero-hour contracts, particularly during the global COVID-19 pandemic. This campaign was founded by Julian Richer in 2020, author of The Ethical Capitalist.

The campaign President is Ian Hodson, who is also President of the Bakers, Food and Allied Workers Union.

Zero Hours Justice was launched with the aim of ending zero-hours contracts, particularly those unilaterally imposed on a worker against their will. In due course, several prolific people joined this cause such as Peter Stefanovic, Declan Owens, Damien Morrison and Pravin Jeyaraj. In 2021, Chris Peace joined as Campaign Director.

Zero Hours Justice focuses on campaigning against the use of zero hours contracts. In 2022, they launched their free Accreditation Scheme to promote employers who do not use zero-hours contracts, or, if they do, only use them in accordance with the campaign's minimum criteria.

This campaign also offers free help and support to the people affected by zero-hour contracts, providing legal information and advice through a telephone helpline, email and website. The campaign also empowers people by circulating necessary information regarding zero hour contracts and promoting healthy working environments.

== Media coverage ==
Zero Hours Justice has worked with a number of media outlets to promote its campaign and raise awareness of the plight of zero hours workers, including: Channel 4's Dispatches (TV programme), Good Housekeeping, and Daily Record (Scotland).

Zero Hours Justice collaborated with Rest Lass, a digital community for the over-50s, for an article published in The Guardian.
