= Maurice Watkins (solicitor) =

British sports administrator (1941–2021)

Watkins in 2011

Edward Maurice Watkins CBE (30 November 1941 – 16 August 2021) was a British solicitor and sports administrator best known as being a long-time director and the club solicitor of Manchester United. He had represented high-profile clients in criminal trials including Eric Cantona and Stuart Hall.

After leaving Manchester United, he served in multiple other sports administration roles including as chairman of British Swimming, overseeing the team's successful Rio 2016 and Tokyo 2020 Olympic cycles. He was joint senior partner of Brabners LLP solicitors in Manchester.

== Personal life ==
Watkins was educated at Manchester Grammar School and University College London.

Watkins died on 16 August 2021, at the age of 79, after suffering from prostate cancer.

== High profile legal work ==
At a January 1995 match with Crystal Palace Eric Cantona performed a 'kung fu' kick into the crowd following abuse from Matthew Simmons. Watkins represented Cantona at the ensuing assault trial. Watkins was solicitor for former BBC broadcaster Stuart Hall at Hall's trial for indecent assault, at which Hall admitted to indecently assaulting 13 girls.

== Positions ==
- Director of the British Association for Sport and Law (Former President & Chairman)
- Member of the FA Premier League Legal Advisory Group
- FA Premier League representative on the Association of European Union Premier Professional Leagues (EPFL)
- Member of working group for financial matters of the FIFA Task Force "For the Good of the Game"
- Interim chairman and non-executive director of the Rugby Football League
- Chairman of European Rugby League
- Regional chairman for Coutts Bank
- Trustee of the Professional Footballers Pension Scheme
- Chairman of Central Manchester University Hospitals NHS Foundation Trust Charity
- Chair of governors at the Manchester Grammar School
- Chairman of the Greyhound Board of Great Britain
- Chairman of Barnsley Football Club (2013–2017)
- Chairman of British Swimming
- Chairman of the British Basketball Federation

== Career in football ==
Martin Edwards asked Watkins to become a director of Manchester United Football Club in May 1984 on the same day as Bobby Charlton. In 1991, when Martin Edwards floated Manchester United on the stock exchange, Watkins joined the PLC Board as a non-executive director. Edwards and Watkins were the only two directors who served both on the Football Board and the PLC Board. At the AGM in 2005 Malcolm Glazer opposed Watkins's re-election to the PLC board along with two other directors Philip Yea a fellow non-executive director and Andy Anson. After Malcolm Glazer had completed his takeover of Manchester United he de-listed it from the stock exchange and made it a private company once again. Watkins remained on the club's football board and was the club's solicitor.

Watkins oversaw numerous high-profile football transfers both at home in the United Kingdom and abroad. He has also represented clubs and players before FIFA, UEFA, the Football Association, the Premier League and the Football League disciplinary bodies. Also he represented players and clubs at the Court of Arbitration for Sport and international and league compensation tribunals. He worked with the South Africa and Nigerian Premier leagues in respect of broadcasting and regulatory matters as well as the Egyptian Sports Council and UAE footballing authorities.

Watkins regularly spoke on football and sports law issues within the United Kingdom and internationally. He represented both the Football Association and the Premier League at conferences in Egypt, France, Qatar, Spain, United Arab Emirates, Trinidad and Tobago and Japan.

In 2012 Watkins was named interim Rugby Football League Chairman after the departure of Richard Lewis.

On 29 June 2012, Watkins stepped down from the board of Manchester United Football Club Ltd after 28 years with the club.

On 30 May 2013, it was announced that Watkins would become chairman of Championship football club Barnsley.

On 31 August 2017, Barnsley announced that Watkins was leaving the club's board of directors and his role as chairman.

== Charitable support ==
Watkins was involved with several causes. Previous roles have included Chairman of the New Children's Hospital Appeal. With his leadership the appeal successfully raised £20 million to provide beds for parents on wards and additional and up-to-date equipment at the new state-of-the-art Royal Manchester Children's Hospital.
