= Martin Edwards =

British football executive (born 1945)

Charles Martin Edwards (born 24 July 1945) is the former chairman of Manchester United, a position he held from 1980 until 2003. He now holds the position of honorary life president at the club and director of Inview Technology.

== Biography ==
=== Education ===
Edwards was born at St Mary's Services Hospital in Adlington, Cheshire, England. At 13, he failed the entrance exam for Stowe School, his parents' first choice, and went to Cokethorpe instead. He left in 1963 with six O levels and started work in the family meat business, initially working as an assistant in shops and on meat counters. He later moved to head office in Miles Platting to work for quality control and sales departments of the manufacturing division, then in the sales office of the catering division. In September 1972, he joined the board, becoming retail/wholesale controller. Edwards was a director of Argyll Foods until November 1983.

=== Manchester United ===
He was elected to the Manchester United board in March 1970. He became chairman on 22 March 1980 following the sudden and unexpected death of his father Louis on 25 February, who had been chairman for the previous 15 years. After the Football Association voted to allow football clubs to have one paid director, Edwards became chief executive on 5 January 1982 and paid himself an annual salary of £30,000.

During the 1979–80 season when Edwards took over as chairman, United finished runners-up to Liverpool in the Football League First Division, but had not won the league title since 1967 and had not won a major trophy at all in three seasons of Dave Sexton's management. At the end of the 1980–81 season, United finished eighth in the league after seven successive wins at the end of the season. Manager Dave Sexton was looking set to be offered a new three-year contract, but the deal was never signed and Edwards sacked Sexton after four seasons without a trophy.

Edwards then began the hunt for a new manager. There was talk that he would appoint Lawrie McMenemy, who had guided Southampton to a shock win over United in the FA Cup final five years earlier, as successor to Dave Sexton. It was also rumoured that United were interested in recruiting Brian Clough, a league title winner and twice a European Cup winner with Nottingham Forest, but Edwards insisted that he would not be approaching Clough. He instead turned to Ron Atkinson, whose impressive West Bromwich Albion side had qualified for the UEFA Cup three times in four seasons with top-five league finishes, reaching the quarter-finals on one occasion. Atkinson insisted in his footballing biography published in 1999 that Edwards was the best chairman he worked for, and he accepted the offer; soon after this appointment, Edwards made the funds available for Atkinson to bring in Albion's midfielder Bryan Robson for a national record fee of £1.5 million. This national record would remain unbroken by English clubs for six years, and Robson went on to be one of the club's greatest ever players.

Atkinson guided United to two FA Cup glories (the first in 1983 and the second in 1985); but, in the 1985–86 season, United faded away to finish fourth after a ten-match winning start to the league season, and speculation about his future as manager was mounting.

In 1983, Edwards had begun looking for younger colleagues to introduce to the club's board. Sir Matt Busby had been appointed president of the club and Michael Edelson was appointed to replace him on the board by Edwards, followed in June 1984 by the addition of club solicitor Maurice Watkins and club legend Bobby Charlton.

In the summer of 1986, Edwards generated £2.3 million (a record fee involving a British club, though Robson's record set in 1981 had yet to be broken by a British club) from the sale of striker Mark Hughes to Barcelona of Spain.

On 4 November 1986, United were floundering in the bottom half of the top division and that night were eliminated from the Football League Cup with a 4–1 defeat at Southampton. The following day, the four-man board convened in Edwards's Old Trafford office and decided a change of manager had to be made. The unanimous decision was to see if Alex Ferguson, then manager of Aberdeen in the Scottish league, was available. According to Ferguson's autobiography, he received a telephone call in his office at Pittodrie from a man with a Scottish accent. He subsequently discovered that this was Manchester United director Michael Edelson, who asked Ferguson if he would be interested in meeting Edwards. Following a short discussion, Edwards made contact with Aberdeen chairman Dick Donald and the four-man United board drove immediately to meet Ferguson halfway between the two cities in Glasgow. Negotiations were quickly concluded and 72 hours later Ferguson was installed as manager of Manchester United.

He rejected a £10m bid for the club by Robert Maxwell in 1984. In 1989, he tried to sell the club to the property developer Michael Knighton for £20m. The sale collapsed when, after being given access to the club's books, Knighton was unable to raise the funds to pay for the club. However, Knighton was still given a seat on the board, and sources at the time suggested that this was in exchange for keeping quiet about what he had seen in the books.

After the failed sale, the club's other directors persuaded Edwards to float the club on the stock market. This raised significant funds the majority for the existing shareholders, such as Edwards. Being a public company did not have the stabilising effect that was originally hoped for. The club was subject to takeover proposals by Rupert Murdoch's BSkyB, with Edwards reportedly agreeing to sell his stake for £98 million. Edwards gradually disposed of his equity in the club and resigned as Chief Executive in 2000, appointing Peter Kenyon as his successor.

The decision by Edwards to remain loyal to Ferguson paid off in 1989–90 as United lifted the FA Cup to end their five-year wait for a major trophy. A year later, United won the European Cup Winners' Cup. 1992 saw United win their first-ever League Cup, and a year later they ended their 26-year wait for the league title when crowned champions of the inaugural Premier League. The double followed a year later. The 1994–95 season was a relative disappointment for Edwards, and indeed everyone else connected to United, as they were pipped to both the league title and the FA Cup and left without a trophy; but United bounced back the following year to win a unique second double. By this stage, Edwards had been able to raise the funds for United to break the national transfer record on two occasions in the space of 18 months – the £3.75 million move for Roy Keane in the 1993 close season, and the £6 million move for Andy Cole in January 1995. The success continued for the rest of the decade, with another league title in 1997 and a unique league title/FA Cup/UEFA Champions League treble in 1999. By the end of the decade, Edwards had made available the cash for United to buy the first two eight-figure signings of their history – defender Jaap Stam and striker Dwight Yorke.

In the 1998–99, he had accepted a £623 million bid from BSkyB to take over Manchester United, but the takeover was cancelled after the Monopolies and Mergers Commission blocked it. The Irish duo J. P. McManus and John Magnier also built a significant stake in the club.

Edwards enabled United to break the national transfer record twice in 2001 when they signed Dutch striker Ruud van Nistelrooy and Argentine midfielder Juan Sebastián Verón, but he was forced to resign as chairman in November 2002, after allegations of using a prostitute on an official club business trip to Switzerland. Despite this, he continued to represent the club at FA and UEFA meetings.

He sold his 6.7% share in the club to new investor Harry Dobson in 2003.

== Premier League ==
Edwards was also part of the 'Big 5', who drove the formation of the Premier League and pulled away from the Football League. In 1985, he said that "smaller clubs are bleeding the game dry. For the sake of the game, they should be put to sleep".

== Personal life ==
Edwards married Susan Lloyd Jones at Saint Mary's Church, Rostherne, near Knutsford, Cheshire, on 30 August, 1968. They have two children, James Louis born in 1969 and Lucinda Jane born in 1972.

== Controversy ==
=== Affairs ===
He has been subject to several newspaper allegations about his private life, alleging several affairs. It was also alleged that he used prostitutes while on club business in Britain, Brazil and Switzerland.

=== Toilet peeping incident ===
Edwards received a police caution following an incident at the Mottram Hall Hotel, near Macclesfield, Cheshire, on 17 August 2002. A woman in her 40s alleged that he had entered the ladies toilets and spied under one of the cubicles at her.

He resigned from the Manchester United board soon after news of the caution broke, and stepped down as chairman seven months later. After the incident, further witnesses came forward stating that they, too, had been victims of similar behaviour in toilets at Old Trafford.

=== Careless driving ===
In July 2005, Edwards was convicted of careless driving, having been involved in a head-on collision near Conwy, North Wales, that April. He had just left the A55 near Conwy golf club, and took a right-hand bend on the wrong side of the road. In a letter to the court, Edwards explained how he had assumed he was on a one-way road after leaving the expressway. The driver of the other car, a Vauxhall Corsa, was badly hurt in the crash, after his car had collided with Edwards's Mercedes-Benz. Edwards was fined £500 plus £45 in prosecution costs, as well as receiving five points on his driving licence.
