= Richer Sounds =

British home entertainment retailer

Richer Sounds ltd
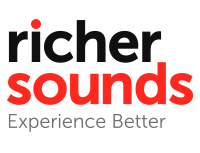
- Type: Unlisted ltd
- Industry: Retailer
- Founded: London Bridge, England (1978)
- Headquarters: London, England
- Key people: Julian Richer, Founder; Julie Abraham, CEO; David Robinson, Chairman; Nathan Kennaugh, MD; Claudia Vernon, Marketing Director
- Products: Hi-fi, home cinema & TV
- Number of employees: 492 (2018)
- Website: richersounds.com

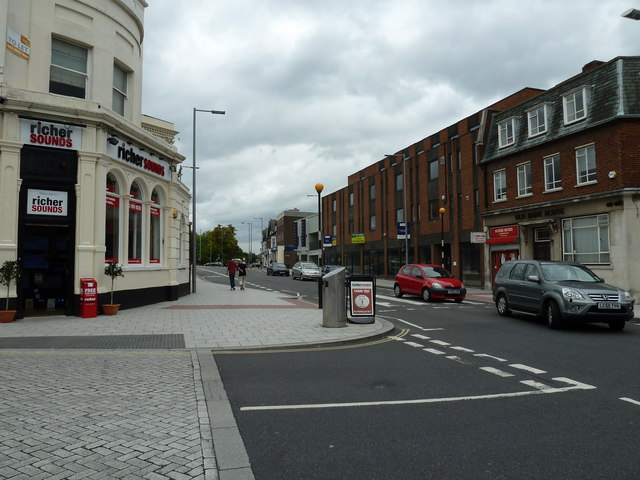
Richer Sounds store in Southampton

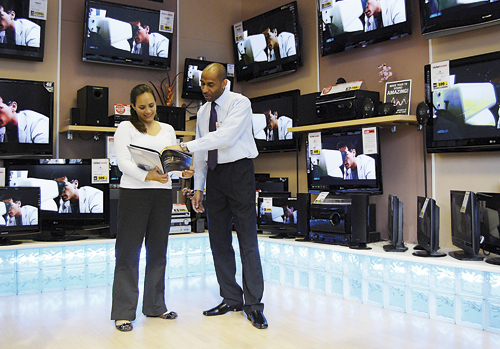
A typical shop layout in 2009

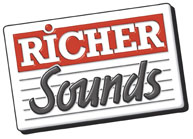
Richer Sounds original logo, 1978–2006

Richer Sounds is a British home entertainment retailer that operates through a chain of 51 stores and online, mainly in England. The business was 100% owned by Julian Richer, the founder and managing director of the company, who in 2019 sold 60% of its shares to an employee ownership trust.

== History of the business ==
Richer Sounds formally began trading in 1978 when Richer, then aged 19, opened his first shop near London Bridge, with the help of photography retailer, Vic Odden. This shop established the record for highest sales per square foot of any retail outlet (£195,426/m^{2} ($27,830/ft^{2})) in the world in 1994, a record still current in 2026 according to the Guinness Book of Records.

In November 2013, Julian Richer announced to the press that, upon his death, he would bequeath 100% of the firm to a trust co-owned by employees of the company. In May 2019, Richer, then aged 60, announced that he had transferred ownership to employees by passing 60% of his shares to a trust, as well as separately paying each of his over 500 employees, excluding directors, a thank you bonus of £1,000 for every year of work, a total of about £4 million, as the employees had worked for an average of 8 years each.

== Awards and recognition ==
Richer Sounds won several Which? 'Retailer of the Year' or 'Best Retailer' awards, including for 2010, 2011, 2015, 2018 2019, 2021, 2022, 2023, and 2024.

Richer Sounds is an accredited holder of the Fair Tax Mark for transparency over tax disclosures and the amount it pays, and a part of the Living Wage Scheme, set up by the Living Wage Foundation. Founder Julian Richer backed the Living Hours campaign, which seeks to curb zero-hour contracts.
