= Julian Richer =

English retail entrepreneur, philanthropist and author

- Born: 1959 (age 66–67); London, England
- Education: Clifton College
- Occupations: Entrepreneur, author, philanthropist
- Known for: Founder of Richer Sounds
- Spouse: Rosie Richer (m. 1982)

Julian Richer LVO (born 1959) is an English retail entrepreneur, philanthropist and author, best known as the founder of Richer Sounds, the UK's largest hi-fi retailer. Richer has gained a reputation for his motivational style of management and his philanthropic and charitable activities.

According to the Sunday Times Rich List in 2019, Richer was worth £160 million.

== Career ==
Richer's business career started at the age of 14 while he was still at school at Clifton College, Bristol, and he opened his first shop near London Bridge aged 19. This store in south London holds the Guinness record for the highest sales per square foot of any retail outlet in the world.

He has been awarded honorary doctorates by Kingston University and Bournemouth University in 2002, University of York and Open University in 2023, as well as University of Worcester in 2025.

Richer was appointed as a Lieutenant of the Royal Victorian Order (LVO) in 2007.

In November 2013, Richer announced to the press that he would bequeath 100% of the firm to a trust co-owned by employees of the company. In May 2019, Richer, then aged 60, announced that he had transferred ownership to employees by passing 60% of his shares to a trust, as well as separately paying each employee, excluding directors, a thank you bonus of £1,000 for every year of work to over 500 employees who had worked an average of 8 years each (circa £4 million).

In 2019, Richer was awarded the 'Outstanding Contribution to Retail' award by Retail Week magazine.

In 2020, What Hi-Fi? gave Richer their Outstanding Contribution award, stating "The man behind Richer Sounds, and much more, has made an undeniably positive mark on the UK hi-fi industry."

In 2022, Richer wrote a series of 31 articles for The Sunday Times in the business section, under the title "Julian Richer Sound Advice". On 16^{th} October 2026 he started his 'Richer Thoughts' column in The Times.

== Charitable interests ==
15% of the profits from Richer Sounds are donated to charities.

Richer has a particular interest in supporting charities involved with issues such as human rights, animal welfare and social housing deprivation.

Richer founded ACTS435, which was launched in December 2009 by the Archbishop of York, Dr John Sentamu, who remains a patron. Acts435 connects people in need with people who can donate. ACTS435 operates from about 600 locations, mostly churches but also Citizens Advice branches and debt counselling centres. Christians Against Poverty and the Trussell Trust are key partners. Over thirty thousand people have benefited from the charity (as of May 2021). The charity allows people to give directly to those in need, meaning that 100% of funds raised by Acts435 goes to the recipients.

He founded the charity ASB Help in 2013 which supports victims of anti-social behaviour. Baroness Newlove, Victims’ Commissioner, endorsed ASB Help soon after, commenting: "I am delighted that ASB Help has launched this service to help equip victims in the fight against anti-social behaviour." The charity’s website provides interactive guides, practical information and the necessary tools on how to effectively report anti-social behaviour. It helps over two thousand people per week.

He founded Richer Unsigned, a not-for-profit designed to promote the best undiscovered music the UK has to offer. Richer Unsigned supports and promotes musicians who may just be getting started, who have been in the industry a while or simply do not have a great label deal. It currently has over 3,000 artists featured on its website.

In 2017, Parallel Histories was launched, which Richer co-founded, with the aim of offering schools a way to teach both sides of contentious historical issues.

In 2018 he founded TaxWatch which launched in October, dedicated to the research and exposure of aggressive tax avoiding corporations. TaxWatch has been cited by several newspapers, including The Times, the Financial Times, The Guardian, The Daily Telegraph and many others as well as Parliament with regard to corporate tax avoidance, including high profile investigations into tech, media and retail companies. It was also included in International Tax Review's 2020–2021 Global Tax 50. International Tax Review’s Global Tax 50 is an annual list of "the most influential figures and events in fiscal policy over the past year." The list also seeks to recognise "who and what will be particularly important" in the coming year.

In November 2019 it was reported in the Sunday Telegraph that he was launching and funding the Good Business Charter to encourage businesses to improve their behaviour, which was confirmed by Carolyn Fairbairn in a speech at the CBI's annual conference the following day. It was launched on 3 February 2020. As of August 2025, the Good Business Charter has grown to over 1,000 business accreditations.

In January 2020, Richer launched Zero Hours Justice, a campaign designed to highlight the exploitative nature of zero hour contracts and ultimately, to seek a complete ban on them, when unilaterally imposed on workers. It has also fought for humane working practices around zero hours contracts, such as advocating for staff to be put on furlough while on zero hours contracts. It provides legal information and advice through a telephone helpline, email and website. Apart from that, this campaign also empowers people by circulating necessary information regarding zero hour contracts and promoting healthy working environments.

On 29 November 2021, The Fairness Foundation was launched, which Richer had founded to change the terms of the public debate about fairness, and to inspire citizens, the media and decision-makers to create a fairer society. The Foundation focuses on areas such as democracy, education, the environment, health, housing, justice, social security, taxation, wealth and work as some of the core issues that need addressing in order to make society fairer. The editorial board is chaired by Will Hutton.

== Books ==
Richer has written several books, including:

The Richer Way, published 2017, which talks about starting a business and how to motivate a workforce by getting the best out of people. The Independent described it as "one of the best business books in history"

The Ethical Capitalist, published 2018, which discusses the need for a new sense of moral purpose in business and how to make business work better for society. This was a Financial Times book of the month.

Our Housing Disaster: and what we can do about it, published 2024, describes how we got to such a catastrophic housing situation and that a new and bold approach to providing the homes that the UK needs is essential. The book was featured by The Guardian and The Times.

A Month of Sundays, published 2026, a collection of Richer's Sunday Times articles, where he expands on the original published columns and shares the ideas, stories, and principles that have shaped his life and career.

== Personal life ==
Richer is married to Rosie. They live near York in North Yorkshire, England.

Richer was baptised into the Anglican faith in 2006 by The Rev Canon Roger Simpson at St Michael Le Belfrey, York and was confirmed later the same year by John Sentamu, Archbishop of York, in his chapel in Bishopthorpe Palace.

In his spare time, Richer plays the drums in the soul/funk/pop group, Ten Millennia, who have supported Shakin' Stevens, The Corrs, Texas, Tony Hadley and Jools Holland [the latter on 13 occasions], including 30 November 2018 at the Royal Albert Hall.
