= 1974 Campeonato Gaúcho =

Campeonato Gaúcho
- Season: 1974
- Champions: Internacional
- 1974 Copa Brasil: Grêmio; Internacional
- Matches played: 183
- Goals scored: 361 (1.97 per match)
- Top goalscorer: Escurinho (Internacional) – 11 goals
- Biggest home win: Encantado 5–1 Armour (March 30, 1974); Novo Hamburgo 4-0 Pratense (May 26, 1974); Associação Santa Cruz 4-0 Armour (June 9, 1974); Gaúcho 4-0 Pratense (June 16, 1974); Internacional 5-1 Associação Santa Cruz (August 11, 1974); Internacional 4-0 Esportivo (August 25, 1974); Internacional 4-0 Inter de Santa Maria (September 22, 1974); Internacional 4-0 Gaúcho (October 6, 1974); Internacional 4-0 Atlético de Carazinho (November 17, 1974)
- Biggest away win: Pratense 1-5 Associação Santa Cruz (May 4, 1974); Associação Santa Cruz 0-4 Grêmio (September 22, 1974)
- Highest scoring: Ypiranga 3-3 Esportivo (March 24, 1974); Encantado 5–1 Armour (March 30, 1974); Associação Caxias 4-2 Rio-Grandense (April 6, 1974); Pratense 1-5 Associação Santa Cruz (May 4, 1974); Grêmio 3-3 Encantado (August 4, 1974); Internacional 5-1 Associação Santa Cruz (August 11, 1974)

The 54th season of the Campeonato Gaúcho kicked off on March 9, 1974, and ended on December 15, 1974. Sixteen teams participated. Internacional won their 22nd title.

== Participating teams ==
Club	Stadium	Home location	Previous season
Armour	Miguel Copatti	Santana do Livramento	13th (Copa Governador)
Associação Caxias	Baixada Rubra	Caxias do Sul	3rd
Associação Santa Cruz	Plátanos	Santa Cruz do Sul	19th
Atlético de Carazinho	Paulo Coutinho	Carazinho	18th
Esportivo	Montanha	Bento Gonçalves	4th
Encantado	Cabriúvas	Encantado	4th (Copa Governador)
Gaúcho	Wolmar Salton	Passo Fundo	5th
Grêmio	Olímpico	Porto Alegre	2nd
Internacional	Beira-Rio	Porto Alegre	1st
Internacional	Presidente Vargas	Santa Maria	6th
Novo Hamburgo	Santa Rosa	Novo Hamburgo	14th
Pratense	Zona Sul	Nova Prata	2nd (Taça Cícero Soares)
Rio-Grandense	Torquato Pontes	Rio Grande	21st
São José	Passo d'Areia	Porto Alegre	11th
São Luiz	19 de Outubro	Ijuí	10th (Copa Governador)
Ypiranga	Colosso da Lagoa	Erechim	13th

== System ==
The championship would have three stages.:

- Preliminary phase: The twelve best clubs in the Copa Governador do Estado of the previous year and another two teams qualified from the Copa Cícero Soares would play in a single round-robin format against each other. the eight best teams would qualify to the Decagonal. the six bottom teams would qualify to the second phase of the Copa Governador do Estado.
- Decagonal: The remaining eight teams, now joined by Grêmio and Internacional, would play each other in a double round-robin format.
- Finals: The winners of the two rounds of the Decagonal qualified to this stage. If the same team won both stages, it would win the title automatically.

== Championship ==
=== Preliminary phase ===
Pos	Team	Pld	W	D	L	GF	GA	GD	Pts	Qualification or relegation
1	Associação Caxias	13	9	3	1	17	9	+8	21	Qualified to Decagonal
2	Internacional de Santa Maria	13	6	5	2	19	11	+8	17	Qualified to Decagonal
3	Encantado	13	5	7	1	17	7	+10	17	Qualified to Decagonal
4	Ypiranga de Erechim	13	6	4	3	16	11	+5	16	Qualified to Decagonal
5	Esportivo	13	6	4	3	13	10	+3	16	Qualified to Decagonal
6	Associação Santa Cruz	13	5	5	3	21	12	+9	15	Qualified to Decagonal
7	Atlético de Carazinho	13	5	5	3	11	8	+3	15	Qualified to Decagonal
8	Gaúcho	13	4	5	4	17	13	+4	13	Qualified to Decagonal
9	Novo Hamburgo	13	4	5	4	10	8	+2	13	Qualified to Copa Governador do Estado Second phase
10	São Luiz	13	4	5	4	14	13	+1	13	Qualified to Copa Governador do Estado Second phase
11	Rio-Grandense	13	2	6	5	9	13	−4	10	Qualified to Copa Governador do Estado Second phase
12	Armour	13	3	1	9	7	21	−14	7	Qualified to Copa Governador do Estado Second phase
13	Pratense	13	0	5	8	5	29	−24	5	Qualified to Copa Governador do Estado Second phase
14	São José	13	0	4	9	7	18	−11	4	Qualified to Copa Governador do Estado Second phase

Updated to match(es) played on June 16, 1974. Source: RSSSF.com
Rules for classification: 1) points; 2) wins; 3) goal difference; 4) number of goals scored.

=== Decagonal ===
==== First round ====
Pos	Team	Pld	W	D	L	GF	GA	GD	Pts	Qualification or relegation
1	Internacional	9	9	0	0	21	1	+20	18	Qualified to Finals
2	Grêmio	9	6	2	1	17	5	+12	14	
3	Associação Caxias	9	4	2	3	10	8	+2	10	
4	Esportivo	9	3	3	3	7	9	−2	9	
5	Internacional de Santa Maria	9	3	3	3	6	10	−4	9	
6	Gaúcho	9	3	2	4	7	10	−3	8	
7	Atlético de Carazinho	9	2	3	4	6	7	−1	7	
8	Associação Santa Cruz	9	2	3	4	8	16	−8	7	
9	Ypiranga de Erechim	9	2	2	5	3	9	−6	6	
10	Encantado	9	0	2	7	7	17	−10	2	

Updated to match(es) played on September 29, 1974. Source: RSSSF.com
Rules for classification: 1) points; 2) wins; 3) goal difference; 4) number of goals scored.

==== Second round ====
Pos	Team	Pld	W	D	L	GF	GA	GD	Pts	Qualification or relegation
1	Internacional	9	9	0	0	22	1	+21	18	Qualified to Finals
2	Grêmio	9	8	0	1	14	5	+9	16	
3	Atlético de Carazinho	9	4	3	2	7	7	0	11	
4	Associação Caxias	9	3	2	4	7	8	−1	8	
5	Internacional de Santa Maria	9	2	4	3	7	8	−1	8	
6	Associação Santa Cruz	9	2	3	4	4	5	−1	7	
7	Encantado	9	2	2	5	3	11	−8	6	
8	Ypiranga de Erechim	9	1	4	4	6	12	−6	6	
9	Gaúcho	9	2	1	6	9	17	−8	5	
10	Esportivo	9	1	3	5	5	10	−5	5	

Updated to match(es) played on December 1, 1974. Source: RSSSF.com
Rules for classification: 1) points; 2) wins; 3) goal difference; 4) number of goals scored.

==== Final standings ====
Pos	Team	Pld	W	D	L	GF	GA	GD	Pts	Qualification or relegation
1	Internacional	18	18	0	0	43	2	+41	36	Champions;Campeonato Brasileiro
2	Grêmio	18	14	2	2	31	10	+21	30	Campeonato Brasileiro
3	Associação Caxias	18	7	4	7	17	16	+1	18	Playoffs
4	Atlético de Carazinho	18	6	6	6	13	14	−1	18	Playoffs
5	Internacional de Santa Maria	18	5	7	6	13	18	−5	17	
6	Esportivo	18	4	6	8	12	19	−7	14	
7	Associação Santa Cruz	18	4	6	8	12	21	−9	14	
8	Gaúcho	18	5	3	10	16	27	−11	13	
9	Ypiranga de Erechim	18	3	6	9	9	21	−12	12	
10	Encantado	18	2	4	12	10	28	−18	8	

Updated to match(es) played on December 1, 1974. Source: RSSSF.com
Rules for classification: 1) points; 2) wins; 3) goal difference; 4) number of goals scored.

===== Third place playoffs =====
Team 1	Agg.	Team 2	1st leg	2nd leg
Atlético de Carazinho	2–0	Associação Caxias	1–0	1–0

== Copa Governador do Estado ==
=== System ===
The cup would have two stages:

- First phase: Eighteen teams would be divided into three groups of six teams. Each team would play twice against the teams of its own group. The four best teams in each group qualified to the Second phase.
- Second phase: The twelve remaining teams joined the six teams that had been eliminated in the Preliminary phase of the Campeonato Gaúcho and played each other in a single round-robin format. The 15 best teams would qualify to the 1975 Campeonato Gaúcho.

=== First phase ===
==== Group A ====
Pos	Team	Pld	W	D	L	GF	GA	GD	Pts	Qualification or relegation
1	Pelotas	10	5	4	1	7	5	+2	14	Qualified to Second phase
2	Grêmio Bagé	10	5	3	2	16	4	+12	13	Qualified to Second phase
3	Guarany de Bagé	10	5	2	3	7	4	+3	12	Qualified to Second phase
4	Cachoeira	10	2	4	4	4	9	−5	8	Qualified to Second phase
5	Farroupilha	10	4	0	6	6	12	−6	8	
6	Riograndense	10	1	3	6	1	7	−6	5	

Updated to match(es) played on August 11, 1974. Source: RSSSF.com
Rules for classification: 1) points; 2) goal difference; 3) wins; 4) number of goals scored.

==== Group B ====
Pos	Team	Pld	W	D	L	GF	GA	GD	Pts	Qualification or relegation
1	Atlântico	9	7	1	1	14	4	+10	15 (Note: Uruguaiana didn't play its last match against Atlântico)	Qualified to Second phase
2	Santo Ângelo	10	5	4	1	13	6	+7	14	Qualified to Second phase
3	Elite	10	2	7	1	8	7	+1	11	Qualified to Second phase
4	Alegrete	10	2	3	5	7	9	−2	7	Qualified to Second phase
5	Santa Rosa	10	2	3	5	8	15	−7	7	
6	Uruguaiana	9	1	2	6	4	13	−9	4	

Updated to match(es) played on August 11, 1974. Source: RSSSF.com
Rules for classification: 1) points; 2) wins; 3) goal difference; 4) number of goals scored.

==== Group C ====
Pos	Team	Pld	W	D	L	GF	GA	GD	Pts	Qualification or relegation
1	Juventude de Guaporé	10	6	2	2	11	6	+5	14	Qualified to Second phase
2	Mundo Novo	10	5	1	4	13	9	+4	11	Qualified to Second phase
3	Lajeadense	10	4	3	3	9	9	0	11	Qualified to Second phase
4	Aimoré	10	2	6	2	8	7	+1	10	Qualified to Second phase
5	Igrejinha	10	3	2	5	8	11	−3	8	
6	Fortes e Livres	10	1	4	5	9	16	−7	6	

Updated to match(es) played on August 4, 1974. Source: RSSSF.com
Rules for classification: 1) points; 2) wins; 3) goal difference; 4) number of goals scored.

=== Second phase ===
Pos	Team	Pld	W	D	L	GF	GA	GD	Pts	Qualification or relegation
1	Grêmio Bagé	16	10	2	4	21	14	+7	22	Qualified to 1975 Campeonato Gaúcho
2	Cachoeira	16	7	7	2	16	9	+7	21	Qualified to 1975 Campeonato Gaúcho
3	Santo Ângelo	16	7	6	3	13	7	+6	20	Qualified to 1975 Campeonato Gaúcho
4	São Luiz	16	8	3	5	21	13	+8	19	Qualified to 1975 Campeonato Gaúcho
5	Pelotas	16	7	5	4	15	14	+1	19	Qualified to 1975 Campeonato Gaúcho
6	Atlântico	16	6	6	4	14	9	+5	18	Qualified to 1975 Campeonato Gaúcho
7	São José	16	6	6	4	11	10	+1	18	Qualified to 1975 Campeonato Gaúcho
8	Rio-Grandense	16	6	5	5	16	11	+5	17	Qualified to 1975 Campeonato Gaúcho
9	Juventude de Guaporé	16	5	7	4	15	12	+3	17	Qualified to 1975 Campeonato Gaúcho
10	Guarany de Bagé	16	4	9	3	10	9	+1	17	Qualified to 1975 Campeonato Gaúcho
11	Elite	16	6	5	5	13	16	−3	17	Qualified to 1975 Campeonato Gaúcho
12	Aimoré	16	3	9	4	9	8	+1	15	Qualified to 1975 Campeonato Gaúcho
13	Novo Hamburgo	16	3	8	5	11	15	−4	14	Qualified to 1975 Campeonato Gaúcho
14	Lajeadense	16	5	3	8	14	16	−2	13	Qualified to 1975 Campeonato Gaúcho
15	Alegrete	16	4	4	8	6	16	−10	12	Qualified to 1975 Campeonato Gaúcho
16	Pratense	16	1	6	9	9	18	−9	8	
17	Mundo Novo	16	1	3	12	6	23	−17	5	
18	Armour	0	0	0	0	0	0	0	0	Withdrew

Updated to match(es) played on December 15, 1974. Source: RSSSF.com
Rules for classification: 1) points; 2) goal difference; 3) wins; 4) number of goals scored.
