= 1973 Campeonato Gaúcho =

Campeonato Gaúcho
- Season: 1973
- Champions: Internacional
- 1973 Copa Brasil: Grêmio; Internacional
- Matches: 322
- Goals: 609 (1.89 per match)
- Top goalscorer: Bebeto (Gaúcho) – 13 goals
- Biggest home win: Associação Caxias 7-0 Fluminense (October 29, 1972)
- Biggest away win: Santo Ângelo 0-4 Grêmio (March 18, 1973); Aimoré 0-4 Internacional (April 28, 1973); Pelotas 0-4 Grêmio (June 10, 1973)
- Highest scoring: Gaúcho 5-2 Fluminense (October 1, 1972); Associação Caxias 7-0 Fluminense (October 29, 1972); Fluminense 6-1 Avenida (December 3, 1972)

Fluminense

The 53rd season of the Campeonato Gaúcho kicked off on August 13, 1972, and ended on August 5, 1973. Twenty-two teams participated. Internacional won their 21st title.

== Participating teams ==
Club	Stadium	Home location	Previous season
Aimoré	Cristo-Rei	São Leopoldo	9th
Atlético de Carazinho	Paulo Coutinho	Carazinho	22nd
Avenida	Eucaliptos	Santa Cruz do Sul	–
Brasil	Bento Freitas	Pelotas	8th
Associação Caxias	Baixada Rubra	Caxias do Sul	4th
Cachoeira	Joaquim Vidal	Cachoeira do Sul	12th
Cruzeiro	Beira-Rio	Porto Alegre	7th
Esportivo	Montanha	Bento Gonçalves	5th
Fluminense	Toca da Onça	Santana do Livramento	–
Gaúcho	Wolmar Salton	Passo Fundo	6th
Grêmio	Pedra Moura	Bagé	11th
Grêmio	Olímpico	Porto Alegre	2nd
Guarany	Estrela D'Alva	Bagé	21st
Internacional	Beira-Rio	Porto Alegre	1st
Internacional	Presidente Vargas	Santa Maria	15th
Novo Hamburgo	Santa Rosa	Novo Hamburgo	3rd
Pelotas	Boca do Lobo	Pelotas	14th
Rio-Grandense	Torquato Pontes	Rio Grande	–
São José	Passo d'Areia	Porto Alegre	13th
Santa Cruz	Plátanos	Santa Cruz do Sul	10th
Santo Ângelo	Zona Norte	Santo Ângelo	–
Ypiranga	Colosso da Lagoa	Erechim	20th

== System ==
The championship would have three stages.:

- Preliminary phase: The twelve best clubs in the first phase of Copa Governador do Estado of the previous year would join the eight teams that had qualified to the 1972 Campeonato Gaúcho's decagonal, with the resulting twenty teams playing in a single round-robin format against each other. The preliminary also counted as the Final phase of the 1972 Copa Governador do Estado, and the ten best teams would qualify to the Dodecagonal. the ten bottom teams would qualify to the second phase of the 1973 Copa Governador do Estado.
- Dodecagonal: The remaining ten teams, now joined by Grêmio and Internacional, would play each other in a double round-robin format.
- Finals: The winners of the two rounds of the Decagonal qualified to this stage. If the same team won both stages, it would win the title automatically.

== Championship ==
=== Preliminary phase (Taça Governador do Estado) ===
Pos	Team	Pld	W	D	L	GF	GA	GD	Pts	Qualification or relegation
1	Brasil de Pelotas	19	13	3	3	28	8	+20	29	Champions;Qualified to Dodecagonal
2	Associação Caxias	19	10	6	3	29	8	+21	26	Qualified to Dodecagonal
3	Aimoré	19	9	8	2	25	13	+12	26	Qualified to Dodecagonal
4	Santo Ângelo	19	8	9	2	22	7	+15	25	Qualified to Dodecagonal
5	Esportivo	19	9	7	3	24	11	+13	25	Qualified to Dodecagonal
6	Gaúcho	19	9	6	4	34	23	+11	24	Qualified to Dodecagonal
7	Pelotas	19	6	10	3	19	13	+6	22	Qualified to Dodecagonal
8	Grêmio Bagé	19	6	9	4	18	16	+2	21	Qualified to Dodecagonal
9	São José	19	8	5	6	11	11	0	21	Qualified to Dodecagonal
10	Internacional de Santa Maria	19	7	6	6	19	16	+3	20	Qualified to Dodecagonal
11	Ypiranga de Erechim	19	6	8	5	16	15	+1	20	Qualified to Copa Governador do Estado Second phase
12	Novo Hamburgo	19	6	7	6	13	16	−3	19	Qualified to Copa Governador do Estado Second phase
13	Cruzeiro	19	5	7	7	11	14	−3	17	Qualified to Copa Governador do Estado Second phase
14	Fluminense	19	6	4	9	19	32	−13	16	Qualified to Copa Governador do Estado Second phase
15	Atlético de Carazinho	19	4	6	9	16	24	−8	14	Qualified to Copa Governador do Estado Second phase
16	Guarany de Bagé	19	4	6	9	19	28	−9	14	Qualified to Copa Governador do Estado Second phase
17	Santa Cruz	19	6	1	12	19	26	−7	13	Qualified to Copa Governador do Estado Second phase
18	Cachoeira	19	4	5	10	10	22	−12	13	Qualified to Copa Governador do Estado Second phase
19	Rio-Grandense	19	1	6	12	13	32	−19	8	Qualified to Copa Governador do Estado Second phase
20	Avenida	19	2	3	14	6	36	−30	7	Qualified to Copa Governador do Estado Second phase

Updated to match(es) played on December 10, 1972. Source: RSSSF.com
Rules for classification: 1) points; 2) goal difference; 3) wins; 4) number of goals scored.

=== Dodecagonal ===
==== First round ====
Pos	Team	Pld	W	D	L	GF	GA	GD	Pts	Qualification or relegation
1	Internacional	11	8	2	1	21	4	+17	18	Qualified to Finals
2	Grêmio	11	8	2	1	18	6	+12	18	
3	Gaúcho	11	4	4	3	13	11	+2	12	
4	Associação Caxias	11	4	4	3	15	14	+1	12	
5	Santo Ângelo	11	3	6	2	6	10	−4	12	
6	Brasil de Pelotas	11	4	3	4	7	8	−1	11	
7	Esportivo	11	3	5	3	8	10	−2	11	
8	Pelotas	11	2	6	3	8	12	−4	10	
9	Grêmio Bagé	11	2	4	5	10	9	+1	8	
10	Internacional de Santa Maria	11	1	6	4	6	12	−6	8	
11	São José	11	2	2	7	5	12	−7	6	
12	Aimoré	11	0	6	5	4	13	−9	6	

Updated to match(es) played on May 20, 1973. Source: RSSSF.com
Rules for classification: 1) points; 2) wins; 3) goal difference; 4) number of goals scored.

==== Second round ====
Pos	Team	Pld	W	D	L	GF	GA	GD	Pts	Qualification or relegation
1	Internacional	11	9	2	0	22	6	+16	20	Qualified to Finals
2	Grêmio	11	7	3	1	15	2	+13	17	
3	Internacional de Santa Maria	11	5	3	3	13	9	+4	13	
4	Esportivo	11	5	2	4	13	15	−2	12	
5	Grêmio Bagé	11	3	6	2	8	7	+1	12	
6	Associação Caxias	11	2	7	2	6	7	−1	11	
7	São José	11	2	5	4	5	8	−3	9	
8	Gaúcho	11	1	7	3	11	14	−3	9	
9	Brasil de Pelotas	11	3	2	6	6	11	−5	8	
10	Aimoré	11	2	4	5	7	11	−4	8	
11	Santo Ângelo	11	1	5	5	5	10	−5	7	
12	Pelotas	11	2	2	7	6	17	−11	6	

Updated to match(es) played on August 5, 1973. Source: RSSSF.com
Rules for classification: 1) points; 2) wins; 3) goal difference; 4) number of goals scored.

==== Final standings ====
Pos	Team	Pld	W	D	L	GF	GA	GD	Pts	Qualification or relegation
1	Internacional	22	17	4	1	43	10	+33	38	Champions;Campeonato Brasileiro
2	Grêmio	22	15	5	2	33	8	+25	35	Campeonato Brasileiro
3	Esportivo	22	8	7	7	21	25	−4	23	
4	Associação Caxias	22	6	11	5	21	21	0	23	
5	Internacional de Santa Maria	22	6	9	7	19	21	−2	21	
6	Gaúcho	22	5	11	6	24	25	−1	21	
7	Grêmio Bagé	22	5	10	7	18	16	+2	20	
8	Brasil de Pelotas	22	7	5	10	13	19	−6	19	
9	Santo Ângelo	22	4	11	7	11	20	−9	19	
10	Pelotas	22	4	8	10	14	29	−15	16	
11	São José	22	4	7	11	10	20	−10	15	
12	Aimoré	22	2	10	10	11	24	−13	14	

Updated to match(es) played on August 5, 1973. Source: RSSSF.com
Rules for classification: 1) points; 2) wins; 3) goal difference; 4) number of goals scored.

== Copa Governador do Estado ==
=== System ===
The cup would have two stages:

- First phase: Twenty-five teams would be divided into five groups of five teams. Each team would play twice against the teams of its own group. The two best teams in each group qualified to the Second phase.
- Second phase: The ten remaining teams joined the ten teams that had been eliminated in the Dodecagonal phase of the Campeonato Gaúcho and played each other in a single round-robin format. The 12 best teams would qualify to the 1974 Campeonato Gaúcho.

=== First phase ===
==== Group A ====
Pos	Team	Pld	W	D	L	GF	GA	GD	Pts	Qualification or relegation
1	Atlético de Carazinho	8	5	1	2	13	5	+8	11	Qualified to Second phase
2	Juventude de Guaporé	8	4	1	3	11	11	0	9	Qualified to Second phase
3	São Paulo	8	4	1	3	8	10	−2	9	
4	Associação Cruz Alta	8	2	2	4	7	8	−1	6	
5	Inter de São Borja	8	1	3	4	4	9	−5	5	

Updated to match(es) played on July 15, 1973. Source: RSSSF.com
Rules for classification: 1) points; 2) goal difference; 3) wins; 4) number of goals scored.

==== Group B ====
Pos	Team	Pld	W	D	L	GF	GA	GD	Pts	Qualification or relegation
1	Armour	8	5	0	3	15	6	+9	10	Qualified to Second phase
2	Lajeado	8	3	3	2	5	5	0	9	Qualified to Second phase
3	Brasil de Farroupilha	8	3	2	3	6	7	−1	8	
4	Elite	8	3	2	3	5	7	−2	8	
5	Cachoeira	8	2	1	5	4	10	−6	5	

Updated to match(es) played on July 15, 1973. Source: RSSSF.com
Rules for classification: 1) points; 2) wins; 3) goal difference; 4) number of goals scored.

==== Group C ====
Pos	Team	Pld	W	D	L	GF	GA	GD	Pts	Qualification or relegation
1	Ypiranga de Erechim	8	6	1	1	12	4	+8	13	Qualified to Second phase
2	Santa Cruz	8	5	2	1	11	3	+8	12	Qualified to Second phase
3	Fluminense	8	2	3	3	4	5	−1	7	
4	Guarany de Bagé	8	1	4	3	4	5	−1	6	
5	Guarany de Garibaldi	8	0	2	6	1	15	−14	2	

Updated to match(es) played on July 15, 1973. Source: RSSSF.com
Rules for classification: 1) points; 2) wins; 3) goal difference; 4) number of goals scored.

==== Group D ====
Pos	Team	Pld	W	D	L	GF	GA	GD	Pts	Qualification or relegation
1	Novo Hamburgo	8	4	4	0	10	4	+6	12	Qualified to Second phase
2	Sá Viana	8	3	3	2	12	8	+4	9	Qualified to Second phase
3	Riograndense	8	3	2	3	10	9	+1	8	
4	Rio Grande	8	2	2	4	8	10	−2	6	
5	Veranense	8	1	3	4	5	14	−9	5	

Updated to match(es) played on July 15, 1973. Source: RSSSF.com
Rules for classification: 1) points; 2) wins; 3) goal difference; 4) number of goals scored.

==== Group E ====
Pos	Team	Pld	W	D	L	GF	GA	GD	Pts	Qualification or relegation
1	São Luiz	8	6	1	1	14	4	+10	13	Qualified to Second phase
2	Encantado	8	4	2	2	14	11	+3	10	Qualified to Second phase
3	Rio-Grandense	7	3	1	3	11	11	0	7 (Note: The last match between Rio-Grandense and Tupi wasn't held)	
4	Tupi	7	2	0	5	8	11	−3	4	
5	Pratense	8	2	0	6	6	16	−10	4	

Updated to match(es) played on July 15, 1973. Source: RSSSF.com
Rules for classification: 1) points; 2) wins; 3) goal difference; 4) number of goals scored.

=== Second phase ===
Pos	Team	Pld	W	D	L	GF	GA	GD	Pts	Qualification or relegation
1	Esportivo	19	12	4	3	23	10	+13	28	Champions;Qualified to 1974 Campeonato Gaúcho
2	Associação Caxias	19	11	4	4	23	10	+13	26	Qualified to 1974 Campeonato Gaúcho
3	Internacional de Santa Maria	19	11	4	4	25	16	+9	26	Qualified to 1974 Campeonato Gaúcho
4	Encantado	19	7	9	3	23	12	+11	23	Qualified to 1974 Campeonato Gaúcho
5	Atlético de Carazinho	19	8	7	4	19	13	+6	23	Qualified to 1974 Campeonato Gaúcho
6	Santa Cruz	19	8	6	5	16	11	+5	22	Qualified to 1974 Campeonato Gaúcho
7	Gaúcho	19	6	9	4	31	20	+11	21	Qualified to 1974 Campeonato Gaúcho
8	Ypiranga de Erechim	19	5	11	3	11	7	+4	21	Qualified to 1974 Campeonato Gaúcho
9	Brasil de Pelotas	19	6	8	5	17	15	+2	20	Withdrew from 1974 Campeonato Gaúcho
10	São Luiz	19	5	10	4	18	18	0	20	Qualified to 1974 Campeonato Gaúcho
11	Novo Hamburgo	19	8	3	8	18	16	+2	19	Qualified to 1974 Campeonato Gaúcho
12	São José	19	6	7	6	11	10	+1	19	Qualified to 1974 Campeonato Gaúcho
13	Armour	19	4	10	5	21	25	−4	18	Qualified to 1974 Campeonato Gaúcho
14	Santo Ângelo	19	3	11	5	10	14	−4	17	
15	Pelotas	19	5	6	8	16	24	−8	16	
16	Aimoré	19	4	7	8	14	14	0	15	
17	Grêmio Bagé	19	5	4	10	13	18	−5	14	
18	Sá Viana	19	4	4	11	12	26	−14	12	
19	Juventude de Guaporé	19	3	5	11	11	28	−17	11	
20	Lajeado	19	4	1	14	10	35	−25	9	

Updated to match(es) played on December 16, 1973. Source: RSSSF.com
Rules for classification: 1) points; 2) goal difference; 3) wins; 4) number of goals scored.
