= 1994 Campeonato Gaúcho =

Campeonato Gaúcho
- Season: 1994
- Champions: Internacional
- Relegated: Novo Hamburgo; São Paulo
- Copa do Brasil: Grêmio; Internacional; Juventude
- Matches played: 506
- Goals scored: 1,063 (2.1 per match)
- Top goalscorer: Paulo Gaúcho (Ypiranga de Erechim) – 24 goals
- Biggest home win: Internacional 6-0 São Luiz (June 19, 1994)
- Biggest away win: Aimoré 0-4 Grêmio (March 26, 1994); Esportivo 0-4 Grêmio (April 10, 1994); Aimoré 0-4 Internacional (April 17, 1994); São Paulo 0-4 Juventude (December 8, 1994)
- Highest scoring: Juventude 5-2 Aimoré (June 9, 1994); Ypiranga de Erechim 5-2 Pelotas (September 7, 1994); Grêmio 4-3 Santa Cruz (December 11, 1994)

The 74th season of the Campeonato Gaúcho kicked off on March 5, 1994 and ended on December 17, 1994. Twenty-four teams participated. Internacional won their 32nd title. Novo Hamburgo and São Paulo were relegated.

== Participating teams ==
Club	Stadium	Home location	Previous season
Aimoré	Cristo-Rei	São Leopoldo	13th
Brasil	Bento Freitas	Pelotas	19th
Brasil	Castanheiras	Farroupilha	17th
Caxias	Centenário	Caxias do Sul	10th
Esportivo	Montanha	Bento Gonçalves	11th
Glória	Altos da Glória	Vacaria	12th
Grêmio	Pedra Moura	Bagé	2nd (Second level)
Grêmio	Olímpico	Porto Alegre	1st
Grêmio	Honório Nunes	Santana do Livramento	7th
Guarani	Edmundo Feix	Venâncio Aires	18th
Guarany	Taba Índia	Cruz Alta	6th
Guarany	Alcides Santarosa	Garibaldi	14th
Internacional	Beira-Rio	Porto Alegre	2nd
Internacional	Presidente Vargas	Santa Maria	5th
Juventude	Alfredo Jaconi	Caxias do Sul	3rd
Lajeadense	Florestal	Lajeado	8th
Novo Hamburgo	Santa Rosa	Novo Hamburgo	22nd
Passo Fundo	Vermelhão da Serra	Passo Fundo	16th
Pelotas	Boca do Lobo	Pelotas	4th
São Luiz	19 de Outubro	Ijuí	20th
São Paulo	Aldo Dapuzzo	Rio Grande	21st
Santa Cruz	Plátanos	Santa Cruz do Sul	15th
Veranópolis	Antônio David Farina	Veranópolis	1st (Second level)
Ypiranga	Colosso da Lagoa	Erechim	9th

== System ==
The championship would be disputed in a double round-robin system, with the team with the most points winning the title, the fourteen best teams qualifying into the Division A of the 1995 championship, the teams that finished from 15th to 22nd going into Division B, and the bottom two teams being relegated.

== Championship ==
The format of the championship was changed that year to a double round-robin tournament, ostensibly as a preparation to reduce the number of teams in the championship. However, Grêmio, Internacional and Juventude, that, due to disputing the national divisions, had even more matches to play in the year than the others, came to December multiple matches behind, with only 17 days left until the end of the season. As a consequence, Juventude on two occasions had to play twice on the same day, and Grêmio at one point had to play three matches in one day. The length of the championship led it to be dubbed the "Interminável" (Neverending) by the press.

Pos	Team	Pld	W	D	L	GF	GA	GD	Pts	Qualification or relegation
1	Internacional	44	26	15	3	66	18	+48	67	Champions; 1995 Division A
2	Juventude	44	24	14	6	82	37	+45	62	1995 Division A
3	Ypiranga de Erechim	44	21	14	9	62	43	+19	56	1995 Division A
4	Glória	44	18	16	10	50	40	+10	52	1995 Division A
5	Caxias	44	19	13	12	47	36	+11	51	1995 Division A
6	Grêmio	44	19	12	13	59	37	+22	50	1995 Division A
7	Grêmio Santanense	44	17	14	13	40	38	+2	48	1995 Division A
8	Brasil de Farroupilha	44	15	18	11	44	35	+9	48	1995 Division A
9	São Luiz	44	19	9	16	50	44	+6	47	1995 Division A
10	Pelotas	44	17	11	16	55	53	+2	45	1995 Division A
11	Brasil de Pelotas	44	13	18	13	35	36	−1	44	1995 Division A
12	Veranópolis	44	15	13	16	54	52	+2	43	1995 Division A
13	Guarani de Venâncio Aires	44	12	19	13	41	41	0	43	1995 Division A
14	Santa Cruz	44	12	18	14	45	53	−8	42	1995 Division A
15	Passo Fundo	44	14	13	17	49	49	0	41	1995 Division B
16	Esportivo	44	13	15	16	42	48	−6	41	1995 Division B
17	Aimoré	44	16	8	20	46	63	−17	40	1995 Division B
18	Internacional de Santa Maria	44	13	13	18	33	51	−18	39	1995 Division B
19	Guarany de Garibaldi	44	10	18	16	36	49	−13	38	1995 Division B
20	Grêmio Bagé	44	9	18	17	37	53	−16	36	1995 Division B
21	Lajeadense	44	10	13	21	33	51	−18	33	1995 Division B
22	Guarany de Cruz Alta	44	5	14	25	31	67	−36	24	1995 Division B
23	São Paulo	44	7	8	29	26	69	−43	22	Relegated
24	Novo Hamburgo	0	0	0	0	0	0	0	0	Withdrew

Updated to match(es) played on December 17, 1994. Source: RSSSF.com
Rules for classification: 1) points; 2) wins; 3) goal difference; 4) number of goals scored.
