= 1972 Campeonato Gaúcho =

Campeonato Gaúcho
- Season: 1972
- Champions: Internacional
- 1972 Copa Brasil: Grêmio; Internacional
- Matches: 200
- Goals: 382 (1.91 per match)
- Top goalscorer: Claudiomiro (Internacional) – 13 goals
- Biggest home win: Associação Caxias 5-1 Nacional (January 19, 1972); Associação Caxias 6-2 Atlético de Carazinho (February 12, 1972); Internacional 4-0 Associação Caxias (April 29, 1972); Internacional 4-0 Cruzeiro (June 11, 1972); Internacional 6-2 Santa Cruz (July 8, 1972)
- Biggest away win: Brasil de Pelotas 0-4 Internacional (June 25, 1972)
- Highest scoring: Associação Caxias 6-2 Atlético de Carazinho (February 12, 1972); Internacional 6-2 Santa Cruz (July 8, 1972)

The 52nd season of the Campeonato Gaúcho kicked off on January 16, 1972, and ended on August 6, 1972. Twenty-five teams participated. Internacional won their 20th title.

== Participating teams ==
Club	Stadium	Home location	Previous season
14 de Julho	Vermelhão da Serra	Passo Fundo	11th
Aimoré	Cristo-Rei	São Leopoldo	15th
Atlético de Carazinho	Paulo Coutinho	Carazinho	–
Associação Caxias	Baixada Rubra	Caxias do Sul	8th
Brasil	Bento Freitas	Pelotas	10th
Cachoeira	Joaquim Vidal	Cachoeira do Sul	–
Cruzeiro	Beira-Rio	Porto Alegre	6th
Esportivo	Montanha	Bento Gonçalves	3rd
Farroupilha	Nicolau Fico	Pelotas	24th
Gaúcho	Wolmar Salton	Passo Fundo	7th
Grêmio	Pedra Moura	Bagé	18th
Grêmio	Olímpico	Porto Alegre	2nd
Guarany	Estrela D'Alva	Bagé	16th
Internacional	Beira-Rio	Porto Alegre	1st
Internacional	Presidente Vargas	Santa Maria	13th
Nacional	Morro dos Ventos Uivantes	Cruz Alta	–
Novo Hamburgo	Santa Rosa	Novo Hamburgo	5th
Pelotas	Boca do Lobo	Pelotas	12th
Riograndense	Eucaliptos	Santa Maria	14th
São José	Passo d'Areia	Porto Alegre	4th
São Paulo	Aldo Dapuzzo	Rio Grande	21st
Sá Viana	Álamos	Uruguaiana	–
Santa Cruz	Plátanos	Santa Cruz do Sul	19th
Tamoio	Zona Norte	Santo Ângelo	22nd
Ypiranga	Colosso da Lagoa	Erechim	17th

== System ==
The championship would have two stages.:

- Preliminary phase: Twenty-three clubs would be divided into four groups - one with five teams and three with six. each team played the teams in its group twice. The two best teams in each group qualified to the decagonal.
- Decagonal: The remaining eight teams, now joined by Grêmio and Internacional, would play each other in a double round-robin format. The team with the most points won the title

== Championship ==
=== Preliminary phase ===
==== Group A ====
Pos	Team	Pld	W	D	L	GF	GA	GD	Pts	Qualification or relegation
1	Gaúcho	8	5	3	0	18	9	+9	13	Qualified to Decagonal
2	Esportivo	8	4	4	0	11	6	+5	12	Qualified to Decagonal
3	Tamoio	8	3	2	3	9	11	−2	8	
4	Ypiranga de Erechim	8	3	1	4	8	9	−1	7	
5	14 de Julho	8	0	0	8	7	18	−11	0	

Updated to match(es) played on March 26, 1972. Source: RSSSF.com
Rules for classification: 1) points; 2) goal difference; 3) wins; 4) number of goals scored.

==== Group B ====
Pos	Team	Pld	W	D	L	GF	GA	GD	Pts	Qualification or relegation
1	Associação Caxias	10	6	2	2	18	7	+11	14	Qualified to Decagonal
2	Aimoré	10	4	4	2	7	5	+2	12	Qualified to Decagonal
3	São José	10	4	4	2	6	5	+1	12	
4	Internacional de Santa Maria	10	3	3	4	9	8	+1	9	
5	Nacional de Cruz Alta	10	2	4	4	7	13	−6	8	
6	Atlético de Carazinho	10	1	3	6	6	15	−9	5	

Updated to match(es) played on March 26, 1972. Source: RSSSF.com
Rules for classification: 1) points; 2) goal difference; 3) wins; 4) number of goals scored.

==== Group C ====
Pos	Team	Pld	W	D	L	GF	GA	GD	Pts	Qualification or relegation
1	Cruzeiro	10	5	3	2	10	5	+5	13	Qualified to Decagonal
2	Santa Cruz	10	5	2	3	12	7	+5	12	Qualified to Decagonal
3	Cachoeira	10	6	0	4	9	6	+3	12	
4	Pelotas	10	3	4	3	8	11	−3	10	
5	Sá Viana	10	3	2	5	6	12	−6	8	
6	Riograndense	10	2	1	7	4	8	−4	5	

Updated to match(es) played on March 26, 1972. Source: RSSSF.com
Rules for classification: 1) points; 2) goal difference; 3) wins; 4) number of goals scored.

==== Group D ====
Pos	Team	Pld	W	D	L	GF	GA	GD	Pts	Qualification or relegation
1	Brasil de Pelotas	10	7	3	0	16	5	+11	17	Qualified to Decagonal
2	Novo Hamburgo	10	4	5	1	8	3	+5	13	Qualified to Decagonal
3	Grêmio Bagé	10	5	2	3	14	9	+5	12	
4	São Paulo	10	3	3	4	9	12	−3	9	
5	Guarany de Bagé	10	3	1	6	7	10	−3	7	
6	Farroupilha	10	0	2	8	3	18	−15	2	

Updated to match(es) played on March 26, 1972. Source: RSSSF.com
Rules for classification: 1) points; 2) goal difference; 3) wins; 4) number of goals scored.

=== Decagonal ===
Pos	Team	Pld	W	D	L	GF	GA	GD	Pts	Qualification or relegation
1	Internacional	18	16	2	0	42	5	+37	34	Champions;Campeonato Brasileiro
2	Grêmio	18	13	3	2	32	9	+23	29	Campeonato Brasileiro
3	Novo Hamburgo	18	9	3	6	15	13	+2	21	
4	Associação Caxias	18	8	4	6	17	16	+1	20	
5	Esportivo	18	6	5	7	15	18	−3	17	
6	Gaúcho	18	5	6	7	12	18	−6	16	
7	Cruzeiro	18	5	6	7	12	20	−8	16	
8	Brasil de Pelotas	18	3	4	11	9	24	−15	10	
9	Aimoré	18	2	5	11	7	18	−11	9	
10	Santa Cruz	18	1	6	11	9	29	−20	8	

Updated to match(es) played on August 6, 1972. Source: RSSSF.com
Rules for classification: 1) points; 2) wins; 3) goal difference; 4) number of goals scored.
