= 1995 Campeonato Gaúcho =

Campeonato Gaúcho
- Season: 1995
- Champions: Grêmio
- Relegated: Grêmio Bagé; Lajeadense
- Copa do Brasil: Grêmio; Internacional
- Série C: Brasil de Pelotas; Caxias; Pelotas; Ypiranga de Erechim
- Matches played: 326
- Goals scored: 785 (2.41 per match)
- Top goalscorer: Aílton (Ypiranga de Erechim) – 16 goals
- Biggest home win: Grêmio 7-0 Grêmio Santanense (April 5, 1995)
- Biggest away win: Santa Cruz 1-6 Guarani-VA (June 25, 1995)
- Highest scoring: Aimoré 3-6 15 de Novembro (February 23, 1995)

The 75th season of the Campeonato Gaúcho kicked off on February 17, 1995 and ended on August 13, 1995. Twenty-four teams participated. Grêmio beat holders Internacional in the finals and won their 30th title. Grêmio Bagé and Lajeadense were relegated.

== Participating teams ==
Club	Home location	Previous season
15 de Novembro	Campo Bom	2nd (Second level)
Aimoré	São Leopoldo	17th
Atlético de Carazinho	Carazinho	1st (Second level)
Brasil	Pelotas	11th
Brasil	Farroupilha	8th
Caxias	Caxias do Sul	5th
Esportivo	Bento Gonçalves	16th
Glória	Vacaria	4th
Grêmio	Bagé	20th
Grêmio	Porto Alegre	6th
Grêmio	Santana do Livramento	7th
Guarani	Venâncio Aires	13th
Guarany	Cruz Alta	22nd
Guarany	Garibaldi	19th
Internacional	Porto Alegre	1st
Internacional	Santa Maria	19th
Juventude	Caxias do Sul	2nd
Lajeadense	Lajeado	21st
Passo Fundo	Passo Fundo	15th
Pelotas	Pelotas	10th
São Luiz	Ijuí	9th
Santa Cruz	Santa Cruz do Sul	14th
Veranópolis	Veranópolis	12th
Ypiranga	Erechim	3rd

== System ==
The championship would have five stages:

- Division A: The 14 best clubs in the previous year's championship played in a double round-robin format against the others in their group. The six best teams qualified to the Second phase, while the two teams with the fewest points in the sum of the rounds would dispute the Division B in 1996.
- Division B: The eight worst teams in the previous year joined the two teams that had been promoted from the Second level, and played each other in a double round-robin system. the best six teams qualified to the Second phase of that division, while the four worst teams would dispute the Relegation Playoffs. In the second phase, the remaining six teams would be divided into two groups of three, in which each team played the teams of its own group in a double round-robin system. The best team of each group would qualify to the Second phase of the championship, and to the Division A of the following year.
- Relegation Playoffs: The four teams that had qualified to this round played each other in a double round-robin format. The two teams with the fewest points were relegated.
- Second phase: The eight remaining teams were divided into two groups of four, in which each team played the teams of its own group in a double round-robin system. The two best teams in each group qualified to the Semifinals.
- Final phases: The four remaining teams played a series of two-legged knockout ties to define the champions.

== Championship ==
=== Division A ===
Pos	Team	Pld	W	D	L	GF	GA	GD	Pts	Qualification or relegation
1	Juventude	26	10	15	1	46	24	+22	45	Qualified
2	Internacional	26	12	6	8	36	28	+8	42	Qualified
3	Grêmio	26	11	9	6	52	27	+25	42	Qualified
4	Ypiranga de Erechim	26	10	10	6	43	30	+13	40	Qualified
5	Brasil de Farroupilha	26	9	10	7	38	39	−1	37	Qualified
6	São Luiz	26	8	11	7	27	25	+2	35	Qualified
7	Glória	26	8	10	8	33	30	+3	34	
8	Caxias	26	8	9	9	35	27	+8	33	
9	Guarani de Venâncio Aires	26	8	8	10	35	37	−2	32	
10	Veranópolis	26	6	12	8	25	27	−2	30	
11	Grêmio Santanense	26	6	12	8	23	38	−15	30	
12	Pelotas	26	5	12	9	28	43	−15	27	
13	Brasil de Pelotas	26	4	12	10	27	38	−11	24	1996 Division B
14	Santa Cruz	26	5	6	15	26	58	−32	21	1996 Division B

Updated to match(es) played on June 25, 1995. Source: RSSSF.com
Rules for classification: 1) points; 2) wins; 3) goal difference; 4) number of goals scored.

=== Division B ===
Pos	Team	Pld	W	D	L	GF	GA	GD	Pts	Qualification or relegation
1	Guarany de Garibaldi	18	8	5	5	23	13	+10	29	Qualified
2	Passo Fundo	18	8	5	5	31	23	+8	29	Qualified
3	Internacional de Santa Maria	18	8	4	6	16	13	+3	28	Qualified
4	Atlético de Carazinho	18	8	4	6	17	17	0	28	Qualified
5	15 de Novembro	18	8	3	7	26	27	−1	27	Qualified
6	Esportivo	18	7	6	5	19	16	+3	27	Qualified
7	Lajeadense	18	7	5	6	15	13	+2	26	Relegation Playoffs
8	Aimoré	18	5	8	5	23	26	−3	23	Relegation Playoffs
9	Guarany de Cruz Alta	18	4	5	9	14	19	−5	17	Relegation Playoffs
10	Grêmio Bagé	18	1	8	9	13	28	−15	11	Relegation Playoffs

Updated to match(es) played on May 17, 1995. Source: RSSSF.com
Rules for classification: 1) points; 2) wins; 3) goal difference; 4) number of goals scored.

==== Second phase ====
===== Group A =====
Pos	Team	Pld	W	D	L	GF	GA	GD	Pts	Qualification or relegation
1	Esportivo	4	3	0	1	9	3	+6	9	Qualified;1996 Division A
2	15 de Novembro	4	1	2	1	2	5	−3	5	
3	Internacional de Santa Maria	4	0	2	2	1	4	−3	2	

Updated to match(es) played on June 28, 1995. Source: RSSSF.com
Rules for classification: 1) points; 2) wins; 3) goal difference; 4) number of goals scored.

===== Group B =====
Pos	Team	Pld	W	D	L	GF	GA	GD	Pts	Qualification or relegation
1	Atlético de Carazinho	4	2	1	1	9	4	+5	7	Qualified;1996 Division A
2	Guarany de Garibaldi	4	1	2	1	5	6	−1	5	
3	Passo Fundo	4	0	3	1	3	7	−4	3	

Updated to match(es) played on June 28, 1995. Source: RSSSF.com
Rules for classification: 1) points; 2) wins; 3) goal difference; 4) number of goals scored.

==== Relegation Playoffs ====
Pos	Team	Pld	W	D	L	GF	GA	GD	Pts	Qualification or relegation
1	Guarany de Cruz Alta	6	2	4	0	6	3	+3	10	Withdrew after the end of the season
2	Aimoré	6	1	5	0	2	1	+1	8	
3	Grêmio Bagé	6	1	4	1	4	4	0	7	Relegated
4	Lajeadense	6	0	3	3	3	7	−4	3	Relegated

Updated to match(es) played on June 18, 1995. Source: RSSSF.com
Rules for classification: 1) points; 2) wins; 3) goal difference; 4) number of goals scored.

=== Second phase ===
==== Group 1 ====
Pos	Team	Pld	W	D	L	GF	GA	GD	Pts	Qualification or relegation
1	Internacional	6	3	1	2	9	4	+5	10	Qualified
2	Juventude	6	3	1	2	9	5	+4	10	Qualified
3	Ypiranga de Erechim	6	3	1	2	7	7	0	10	
4	Esportivo	6	1	1	4	1	10	−9	4	

Updated to match(es) played on July 19, 1995. Source: RSSSF.com
Rules for classification: 1) points; 2) wins; 3) goal difference; 4) number of goals scored.

==== Group 2 ====
Pos	Team	Pld	W	D	L	GF	GA	GD	Pts	Qualification or relegation
1	Grêmio	6	4	2	0	13	5	+8	14	Qualified
2	São Luiz	6	2	2	2	7	7	0	8	Qualified
3	Brasil de Farroupilha	6	1	2	3	2	3	−1	5	
4	Atlético de Carazinho	6	1	2	3	2	9	−7	5	

Updated to match(es) played on July 19, 1995. Source: RSSSF.com
Rules for classification: 1) points; 2) wins; 3) goal difference; 4) number of goals scored.

=== Semifinals ===
Team 1	Agg.	Team 2	1st leg	2nd leg
Juventude	2–3	Grêmio	2–1	0–2
São Luiz	1–9	Internacional	1–5	0–4

=== Finals ===
Team 1	Agg.	Team 2	1st leg	2nd leg
Internacional	2–3	Grêmio	1–1	1–2

6 August 1995
Finals

Internacional	1 – 1	Grêmio
Mazinho Loyola 28'	Report	Nildo 73'

Beira-Rio, Porto Alegre
Attendance: 45,480
Referee: Luis Cunha Martins
13 August 1995
Finals

Grêmio	2 – 1	Internacional
Nildo 7'; Carlos Miguel 53'	Report	Zé Alcino 52'

Olímpico, Porto Alegre
Attendance: 57,408
Referee: Silvio Luis de Oliveira
