= 1993 Campeonato Gaúcho =

Campeonato Gaúcho
- Season: 1993
- Champions: Grêmio
- Relegated: Dínamo; Ta-Guá
- Copa do Brasil: Grêmio; Internacional
- Matches played: 335
- Goals scored: 709 (2.12 per match)
- Top goalscorer: Mauro (Grêmio Santanense) – 19 goals
- Biggest home win: Grêmio 7-0 Esportivo (May 18, 1993); Internacional 8-1 Grêmio Santanense (May 23, 1993)
- Biggest away win: Ta-Guá 0-4 Caxias (March 28, 1993); Ta-Guá 0-4 Guarany de Cruz Alta (April 4, 1993)
- Highest scoring: Internacional 8-1 Grêmio Santanense (May 23, 1993)

The 73rd season of the Campeonato Gaúcho kicked off on February 27, 1993, and ended on July 21, 1993. Twenty-four teams participated. Grêmio won their 29th title. Dínamo and Ta-Guá were relegated.

== Participating teams ==
Club	Stadium	Home location	Previous season
Aimoré	Cristo-Rei	São Leopoldo	18th
Brasil	Bento Freitas	Pelotas	4th
Brasil	Castanheiras	Farroupilha	1st (Second level)
Caxias	Centenário	Caxias do Sul	5th
Dínamo	Carlos Denardin	Santa Rosa	15th
Esportivo	Montanha	Bento Gonçalves	6th
Glória	Altos da Glória	Vacaria	7th
Grêmio	Olímpico	Porto Alegre	2nd
Grêmio	Honório Nunes	Santana do Livramento	14th
Guarani	Edmundo Feix	Venâncio Aires	13th
Guarany	Taba Índia	Cruz Alta	19th
Guarany	Alcides Santarosa	Garibaldi	2nd (Second level)
Internacional	Beira-Rio	Porto Alegre	1st
Internacional	Presidente Vargas	Santa Maria	8th
Juventude	Alfredo Jaconi	Caxias do Sul	16th
Lajeadense	Florestal	Lajeado	20th
Novo Hamburgo	Santa Rosa	Novo Hamburgo	11th
Passo Fundo	Vermelhão da Serra	Passo Fundo	22nd
Pelotas	Boca do Lobo	Pelotas	3rd
São Luiz	19 de Outubro	Ijuí	10th
São Paulo	Aldo Dapuzzo	Rio Grande	9th
Santa Cruz	Plátanos	Santa Cruz do Sul	12th
Ta-Guá	Plácido Scussel	Getúlio Vargas	21st
Ypiranga	Colosso da Lagoa	Erechim	17th

== System ==
The championship would have three stages:

- First phase: Grêmio and Internacional earned a bye directly to the Second phase. The remaining twenty-two teams played each other in a single round-robin system. The fourteen best teams qualified to the Second phase, while the bottom two teams would be relegated.
- Second phase: The sixteen remaining teams were divided into four groups of four, in which each team played the teams of its own group in a double round-robin system. The two best teams in each group qualified to the Final octogonal.
- Final octogonal: The remaining eight teams played each other in a double round-robin system, with the team with the most points winning the title.

== Championship ==
=== First phase ===
Pos	Team	Pld	W	D	L	GF	GA	GD	Pts	Qualification or relegation
1	Caxias	21	10	8	3	26	15	+11	28	Qualified
2	Ypiranga de Erechim	21	10	6	5	31	18	+13	26	Qualified
3	Lajeadense	21	10	6	5	30	23	+7	26	Qualified
4	Glória	21	8	10	3	21	15	+6	26	Qualified
5	Juventude	21	9	7	5	30	20	+10	25	Qualified
6	Guarany de Garibaldi	21	10	4	7	26	23	+3	24	Qualified
7	Santa Cruz	21	9	5	7	24	20	+4	23	Qualified
8	Pelotas	21	8	7	6	26	22	+4	23	Qualified
9	Aimoré	21	8	6	7	17	19	−2	22	Qualified
10	Grêmio Santanense	21	8	5	8	23	22	+1	21	Qualified
11	Guarany de Cruz Alta	21	8	5	8	25	26	−1	21	Qualified
12	Esportivo	21	8	5	8	16	18	−2	21	Qualified
13	Internacional de Santa Maria	21	7	7	7	24	25	−1	21	Qualified
14	Passo Fundo	21	7	7	7	26	30	−4	21	Qualified
15	Brasil de Farroupilha	21	8	4	9	29	29	0	20	
16	Guarani de Venâncio Aires	21	7	6	8	24	19	+5	20	
17	Brasil de Pelotas	21	7	6	8	27	23	+4	20	
18	São Luiz	21	5	9	7	17	18	−1	19	
19	São Paulo	21	4	10	7	10	19	−9	18	
20	Novo Hamburgo	21	5	6	10	23	30	−7	16	
21	Dínamo	21	5	4	12	24	28	−4	14	Relegated
22	Ta-Guá	21	2	3	16	11	48	−37	7	Relegated

Updated to match(es) played on May 12, 1993. Source: RSSSF.com
Rules for classification: 1) points; 2) wins; 3) goal difference; 4) number of goals scored.

=== Second phase ===
==== Group A ====
Pos	Team	Pld	W	D	L	GF	GA	GD	Pts	Qualification or relegation
1	Pelotas	6	2	3	1	4	4	0	7	Qualified
2	Guarany de Cruz Alta	6	2	3	1	4	4	0	7	Qualified
3	Caxias	6	2	2	2	8	5	+3	6	
4	Aimoré	6	1	2	3	8	11	−3	4	

Updated to match(es) played on June 10, 1993. Source: RSSSF.com
Rules for classification: 1) points; 2) wins; 3) goal difference; 4) number of goals scored.

==== Group B ====
Pos	Team	Pld	W	D	L	GF	GA	GD	Pts	Qualification or relegation
1	Grêmio	6	3	1	2	14	7	+7	7	Qualified
2	Juventude	6	2	3	1	7	6	+1	7	Qualified
3	Esportivo	6	1	4	1	4	10	−6	6	
4	Guarany de Garibaldi	6	0	4	2	5	7	−2	4	

Updated to match(es) played on June 10, 1993. Source: RSSSF.com
Rules for classification: 1) points; 2) wins; 3) goal difference; 4) number of goals scored.

==== Group C ====
Pos	Team	Pld	W	D	L	GF	GA	GD	Pts	Qualification or relegation
1	Lajeadense	6	3	1	2	5	3	+2	7	Qualified
2	Internacional de Santa Maria	6	3	1	2	7	6	+1	7	Qualified
3	Ypiranga de Erechim	6	3	1	2	6	6	0	7	
4	Passo Fundo	6	0	3	3	5	8	−3	3	

Updated to match(es) played on June 10, 1993. Source: RSSSF.com
Rules for classification: 1) points; 2) wins; 3) goal difference; 4) number of goals scored.

==== Group D ====
Pos	Team	Pld	W	D	L	GF	GA	GD	Pts	Qualification or relegation
1	Internacional	6	5	0	1	17	4	+13	10	Qualified
2	Grêmio Santanense	6	2	2	2	8	13	−5	6	Qualified
3	Glória	6	2	1	3	9	12	−3	5	
4	Santa Cruz	6	1	1	4	3	8	−5	3	

Updated to match(es) played on June 10, 1993. Source: RSSSF.com
Rules for classification: 1) points; 2) wins; 3) goal difference; 4) number of goals scored.

=== Final octogonal ===
Pos	Team	Pld	W	D	L	GF	GA	GD	Pts	Qualification or relegation
1	Grêmio	14	9	5	0	17	5	+12	23	Champions
2	Internacional	14	6	6	2	19	9	+10	18	
3	Juventude	14	4	8	2	9	9	0	16	
4	Pelotas	14	3	9	2	9	9	0	15	
5	Internacional de Santa Maria	14	1	9	4	3	8	−5	11	
6	Guarany de Cruz Alta	14	1	7	6	6	14	−8	9	
7	Grêmio Santanense	14	3	2	9	13	21	−8	8	
8	Lajeadense	14	4	4	6	13	14	−1	7 (Note: Lajeadense lost 5 points for fielding an ineligible player.)	

Updated to match(es) played on July 21, 1993. Source: RSSSF.com
Rules for classification: 1) points; 2) wins; 3) goal difference; 4) number of goals scored.
