= Goico =

Brazilian footballer (born 1975)

Personal information
- Full name: Laerte Fontana
- Date of birth: 13 September 1975 (age 51)
- Place of birth: Santa Maria, Brazil
- Position: Goalkeeper

Youth career
- Cruzeiro de Santiago

Senior career*
Years	Team	Apps	(Gls)
1992–1994	Inter de Santa Maria		
1995–1998	São José-CS		
2000	Inter de Santa Maria		
2001	São Gabriel		
2001	Cachoeira		
2002	São Gabriel		
2003–2005	Inter de Santa Maria		
2005	Farroupilha		
2006	Bagé		
2007	São Gabriel		
2008–2009	Inter de Santa Maria		
2010–2012	Riograndense-SM		
2012–2013	Guarany de Bagé		
2014–2015	Inter de Santa Maria		
2016	Riograndense-SM		
- * Club domestic league appearances and goals as of 29 October 2023

Laerte Fontana (born 13 September 1975), better known as Goico, is a Brazilian former professional footballer who played as a goalkeeper.

== Career ==
Goico is the player with most appearances by Inter de Santa Maria, with 213 matches.

On 17 August 2008, in the match Inter de Santa Maria vs. Engenheiro Beltrão valid for Campeonato Brasileiro Série C, Goico scored a bicycle kick goal in the injury time of match.

Laerte is called "Goico" in reference to Sergio Goycochea, an Argentine goalkeeper who became famous for his performance in penalty shoot-outs.

== Honours ==
São José-CS

- Campeonato Gaúcho Série A2: 1997

Cachoeira

- Campeonato Gaúcho Série B: 2001

== See also ==
- List of goalscoring goalkeepers
