= 1988 Campeonato Gaúcho =

Campeonato Gaúcho
- Season: 1988
- Champions: Grêmio
- Relegated: Brasil de Pelotas; Guarany de Cruz Alta
- Copa do Brasil: Grêmio; Internacional
- Série B: Juventude; Caxias; Pelotas
- Série C: Esportivo; Guarany de Cruz Alta; Internacional de Santa Maria
- Matches played: 183
- Goals scored: 347 (1.9 per match)
- Top goalscorer: Lima (Grêmio) – 17 goals
- Biggest home win: Grêmio 6-1 São Paulo (April 6, 1988)
- Biggest away win: Aimoré 0-4 Lajeadense (May 8, 1988)
- Highest scoring: Grêmio 6-1 São Paulo (April 6, 1988)

The 68th season of the Campeonato Gaúcho kicked off on February 20, 1988, and ended on June 26, 1988. Fourteen teams participated. Holders Grêmio won their 26th title. Brasil de Pelotas and Guarany de Cruz Alta were relegated.

== Participating teams ==
Club	Stadium	Home location	Previous season
Aimoré	Cristo-Rei	São Leopoldo	2nd (Second level)
Brasil	Bento Freitas	Pelotas	6th
Caxias	Centenário	Caxias do Sul	4th
Esportivo	Montanha	Bento Gonçalves	3rd
Grêmio	Olímpico	Porto Alegre	1st
Guarany	Taba Índia	Cruz Alta	1st (Second level)
Internacional	Beira-Rio	Porto Alegre	2nd
Internacional	Presidente Vargas	Santa Maria	9th
Juventude	Alfredo Jaconi	Caxias do Sul	5th
Lajeadense	Florestal	Lajeado	12th
Passo Fundo	Vermelhão da Serra	Passo Fundo	10th
Pelotas	Boca do Lobo	Pelotas	11th
São Paulo	Aldo Dapuzzo	Rio Grande	8th
Santa Cruz	Plátanos	Santa Cruz do Sul	7th

== System ==
The championship would have three stages.:

- First phase: The fourteen clubs were divided into two groups of seven. In the first round, teams from one group played against teams from the other group once. In the second round, the teams from each group played in single round-robin format against the others in their group. In each round, the two best teams in each group would dispute a knockout phase, played in one-legged ties, to define the round champions, who would receive one bonus point for the Final quadrangular. The six best teams in the sum of both rounds qualified into the Final hexagonal and all the non-qualified teams would play the Relegation tournament.
- Relegation Tournament: The eight remaining teams played each other in a double round-robin system; The teams that had finished 7th and 8th in the First round received two bonus points and the teams that had finished 9th and 10th received one bonus point. the two teams with the fewest points were relegated.
- Final hexagonal: The six remaining teams played each other in a double round-robin system; the team with the most points won the title.

== Championship ==
=== First phase ===
==== First round ====
===== Group 1 =====
Pos	Team	Pld	W	D	L	GF	GA	GD	Pts	Qualification or relegation
1	Pelotas	7	3	3	1	7	4	+3	9	Qualified
2	Juventude	7	2	5	0	9	7	+2	9	Qualified
3	Aimoré	7	3	2	2	8	8	0	8	
4	Internacional	7	3	1	3	5	3	+2	7	
5	Guarany de Cruz Alta	7	2	2	3	10	13	−3	6	
6	Internacional de Santa Maria	7	1	3	3	3	5	−2	5	
7	Esportivo	7	0	5	2	3	5	−2	5	

Updated to match(es) played on March 13, 1988. Source: RSSSF.com
Rules for classification: 1) points; 2) wins; 3) goal difference; 4) number of goals scored.

===== Group 2 =====
Pos	Team	Pld	W	D	L	GF	GA	GD	Pts	Qualification or relegation
1	Caxias	7	5	2	0	9	3	+6	12	Qualified
2	Grêmio	7	4	2	1	9	5	+4	10	Qualified
3	Santa Cruz	7	3	3	1	9	6	+3	9	
4	São Paulo	7	1	5	1	8	8	0	7	
5	Passo Fundo	7	1	4	2	5	6	−1	6	
6	Brasil de Pelotas	7	0	3	4	4	10	−6	3	
7	Lajeadense	7	0	2	5	1	7	−6	2	

Updated to match(es) played on March 13, 1988. Source: RSSSF.com
Rules for classification: 1) points; 2) wins; 3) goal difference; 4) number of goals scored.

===== Semifinals =====
Team 1	Score	Team 2
Grêmio	2–0	Pelotas
Caxias	1–1 (p. 4-3)	Juventude

===== Finals =====
Team 1	Score	Team 2
Caxias	1–2	Grêmio

==== Second round ====
===== Group 1 =====
Pos	Team	Pld	W	D	L	GF	GA	GD	Pts	Qualification or relegation
1	Internacional	6	2	4	0	5	1	+4	8	Qualified
2	Internacional de Santa Maria	6	3	1	2	6	4	+2	7	Qualified
3	Guarany de Cruz Alta	6	1	4	1	5	5	0	6	
4	Aimoré	6	1	4	1	4	4	0	6	
5	Juventude	6	2	2	2	5	7	−2	6	
6	Pelotas	6	1	3	2	3	4	−1	5	
7	Esportivo	6	0	4	2	2	4	−2	4	

Updated to match(es) played on April 28, 1988. Source: RSSSF.com
Rules for classification: 1) points; 2) wins; 3) goal difference; 4) number of goals scored.

===== Group 2 =====
Pos	Team	Pld	W	D	L	GF	GA	GD	Pts	Qualification or relegation
1	Grêmio	6	5	0	1	19	5	+14	10	Qualified
2	Santa Cruz	6	2	3	1	4	3	+1	7	Qualified
3	Caxias	6	2	2	2	8	11	−3	6	
4	Passo Fundo	6	2	1	3	6	9	−3	5	
5	Brasil de Pelotas	6	1	3	2	3	6	−3	5	
6	São Paulo	6	2	1	3	4	9	−5	5	
7	Lajeadense	6	1	2	3	5	6	−1	4	

Updated to match(es) played on April 28, 1988. Source: RSSSF.com
Rules for classification: 1) points; 2) wins; 3) goal difference; 4) number of goals scored.

===== Semifinals =====
Team 1	Score	Team 2
Internacional	3–0	Santa Cruz
Grêmio	1–0	Internacional de Santa Maria

===== Finals =====
Team 1	Score	Team 2
Grêmio	3–1	Internacional

==== Final standings ====
Pos	Team	Pld	W	D	L	GF	GA	GD	Pts	Qualification or relegation
1	Grêmio	13	9	2	2	28	10	+18	20	Qualified
2	Caxias	13	7	4	2	17	14	+3	18	Qualified
3	Santa Cruz	13	5	6	2	13	9	+4	16	Qualified
4	Internacional	13	5	5	3	10	4	+6	15	Qualified
5	Juventude	13	4	7	2	14	14	0	15	Qualified
6	Pelotas	13	4	6	3	10	8	+2	14	Qualified
7	Aimoré	13	4	6	3	12	12	0	14	Relegation Tournament
8	Internacional de Santa Maria	13	4	4	5	9	9	0	12	Relegation Tournament
9	Guarany de Cruz Alta	13	3	6	4	15	18	−3	12	Relegation Tournament
10	São Paulo	13	3	6	4	12	17	−5	12	Relegation Tournament
11	Passo Fundo	13	3	5	5	11	15	−4	11	Relegation Tournament
12	Esportivo	13	0	9	4	5	9	−4	9	Relegation Tournament
13	Brasil de Pelotas	13	1	6	6	7	16	−9	8	Relegation Tournament
14	Lajeadense	13	1	4	8	6	13	−7	6	Relegation Tournament

Updated to match(es) played on April 28, 1988. Source: RSSSF.com
Rules for classification: 1) points; 2) wins; 3) goal difference; 4) number of goals scored.

=== Relegation tournament ===
Pos	Team	Pld	W	D	L	GF	GA	GD	Pts	Qualification or relegation
1	Internacional de Santa Maria	14	8	2	4	14	8	+6	20	
2	Esportivo	14	7	5	2	18	12	+6	19	
3	Aimoré	14	6	3	5	17	19	−2	17	
4	Passo Fundo	14	6	4	4	15	12	+3	16	
5	Lajeadense	14	5	3	6	18	14	+4	13	
6	São Paulo	14	5	2	7	11	14	−3	13	
7	Brasil de Pelotas	14	4	3	7	11	17	−6	11	Relegated
8	Guarany de Cruz Alta	14	3	2	9	9	17	−8	9	Relegated

Updated to match(es) played on June 25, 1988. Source: RSSSF.com
Rules for classification: 1) points; 2) wins; 3) goal difference; 4) number of goals scored.

=== Final hexagonal ===
Pos	Team	Pld	W	D	L	GF	GA	GD	Pts	Qualification or relegation
1	Grêmio	10	4	5	1	12	7	+5	15	Champions
2	Internacional	10	4	5	1	13	6	+7	13	
3	Pelotas	10	4	3	3	8	10	−2	11	
4	Santa Cruz	10	1	7	2	7	8	−1	9	
5	Juventude	10	1	6	3	7	10	−3	8	
6	Caxias	10	0	6	4	3	9	−6	6	

Updated to match(es) played on June 26, 1988. Source: RSSSF.com
Rules for classification: 1) points; 2) wins; 3) goal difference; 4) number of goals scored.
