= 1965 Campeonato Gaúcho =

Campeonato Gaúcho
- Season: 1965
- Dates: 5 June – 11 December
- Champions: Grêmio (16th title)
- Relegated: Cruzeiro
- Taça Brasil: Grêmio
- Matches played: 132
- Goals scored: 346 (2.62 per match)
- Top goalscorer: Alcindo (20 goals)

The 1965 Campeonato Gaúcho was the 45th season of Rio Grande do Sul's top association football league. Grêmio won their 16th title.

== Format ==
The championship was contested by the twelve teams in a double round-robin system, with the team with the most points winning the title and qualifying to the 1966 Taça Brasil. The last placed team played a two-legged playoff known as Torneio de Morte against the 1965 Second Division champions Riograndense (RG).

== Teams ==
Club	Location	Titles	Last season
Aimoré	São Leopoldo	0	7th
Brasil	Pelotas	1	4th
Cruzeiro	Porto Alegre	1	10th
Farroupilha	Pelotas	1	8th
Flamengo^{A}	Caxias do Sul	0	11th
Floriano^{B}	Novo Hamburgo	0	5th
Grêmio	Porto Alegre	15	1st
Guarany	Bagé	2	9th
Internacional	Porto Alegre	16	2nd
Juventude	Caxias do Sul	0	3rd
Pelotas	Pelotas	1	6th
Rio Grande	Rio Grande, Rio Grande do Sul	1	12th

A. Caxias was known as Flamengo until 1971.
B. Novo Hamburgo was known as Floriano from 1942 until 1968.

== Championship ==
Pos	Team	Pld	W	D	L	GF	GA	GD	Pts	Qualification or relegation
1	Grêmio (C)	22	20	2	0	46	9	+37	42	Qualification to 1966 Taça Brasil
2	Juventude	22	12	4	6	31	21	+10	28	
3	Floriano	22	10	6	6	30	26	+4	26	
4	Internacional	22	10	5	7	30	21	+9	25	
5	Brasil	22	10	5	7	35	26	+9	25	
6	Guarany (BA)	22	10	4	8	34	26	+8	24	
7	Pelotas	22	8	6	8	23	26	−3	22	
8	Rio Grande	22	9	2	11	38	32	+6	20	
9	Flamengo	22	7	6	9	24	29	−5	20	
10	Farroupilha	22	6	3	13	22	34	−12	15	
11	Aimoré	22	5	1	16	15	43	−28	11	
12	Cruzeiro (R)	22	1	4	17	18	53	−35	6	Torneio da Morte

(C) Champions; (R) Relegated

== Torneio da Morte ==
27 March 1966

Riograndense (RG)	1–0	Cruzeiro

Porto Alegre
3 April 1966

Cruzeiro	2–2	Riograndense (RG)

Riograndense are promoted to the 1966 season. Cruzeiro are relegated to the Second Division.
