= 1989 Campeonato Gaúcho =

Campeonato Gaúcho
- Season: 1989
- Champions: Grêmio
- Relegated: São Paulo; Internacional de Santa Maria
- Copa do Brasil: Grêmio; Internacional
- Série B: Juventude; Caxias; Santa Cruz; Esportivo; Novo Hamburgo; Pelotas
- Matches played: 189
- Goals scored: 393 (2.08 per match)
- Top goalscorer: Caio (Juventude) – 10 goals
- Biggest home win: Grêmio 5-0 Santa Cruz (March 1, 1989); Juventude 5-0 Internacional de Santa Maria (July 2, 1989)
- Biggest away win: São Paulo 0-4 Passo Fundo (March 19, 1989); Pelotas 0-4 Grêmio (May 21, 1989)
- Highest scoring: Juventude 4-3 Grêmio (April 16, 1989)

The 69th season of the Campeonato Gaúcho kicked off on February 26, 1989, and ended on August 13, 1989. Fourteen teams participated. Holders Grêmio won their 27th title. São Paulo and Internacional de Santa Maria were relegated.

== Participating teams ==
Club	Stadium	Home location	Previous season
Aimoré	Cristo-Rei	São Leopoldo	9th
Caxias	Centenário	Caxias do Sul	6th
Esportivo	Montanha	Bento Gonçalves	8th
Glória	Altos da Glória	Vacaria	1st (Second level)
Grêmio	Olímpico	Porto Alegre	1st
Internacional	Beira-Rio	Porto Alegre	2nd
Internacional	Presidente Vargas	Santa Maria	7th
Juventude	Alfredo Jaconi	Caxias do Sul	5th
Lajeadense	Florestal	Lajeado	11th
Novo Hamburgo	Santa Rosa	Novo Hamburgo	2nd (Second level)
Passo Fundo	Vermelhão da Serra	Passo Fundo	10th
Pelotas	Boca do Lobo	Pelotas	3rd
São Paulo	Aldo Dapuzzo	Rio Grande	12th
Santa Cruz	Plátanos	Santa Cruz do Sul	4th

== System ==
The championship would have three stages. Three points were given for a win, and all ties led to penalty shootouts, the winner of which won two points and the loser one.:

- First phase: The fourteen clubs were divided into two groups of seven. In the first round, teams from one group played against teams from the other group once. In the second round, the teams from each group played in single round-robin format against the others in their group. In each round, the two best teams in each group would dispute a final quadrangular, also played in a single round-robin system, in which the best three teams would qualify to the Final hexagonal, receiving a number of bonus points according to their placing. In case the same teams qualified through the round quadrangulars, the remaining berths in the final hexagonal would be given to the teams with the best overall record. All the non-qualified teams would play the Relegation tournament. In addition, the best and the second-best eliminated team earned two and one bonus points, respectively, for the Relegation tournament.
- Relegation Tournament: The eight remaining teams played each other in a double round-robin system; the two teams with the fewest points were relegated.
- Final hexagonal: The six remaining teams played each other in a double round-robin system; the team with the most points won the title.

== Championship ==
=== First phase ===
==== First round ====
===== Group 1 =====
Pos	Team	Pld	W	OTW	OTL	L	GF	GA	GD	Pts	Qualification or relegation
1	Internacional	7	3	3	0	1	9	4	+5	15	Qualified
2	Caxias	7	4	0	0	3	9	10	−1	12	Qualified
3	Aimoré	7	1	3	2	1	3	3	0	11	
4	Santa Cruz	7	1	2	1	3	4	11	−7	8	
5	Internacional de Santa Maria	7	1	2	0	4	6	9	−3	7	
6	São Paulo	7	1	1	0	5	5	14	−9	5	
7	Lajeadense	7	0	0	2	5	5	15	−10	2	

Updated to match(es) played on March 19, 1989. Source: RSSSF.com
Rules for classification: 1) points; 2) wins; 3) goal difference; 4) number of goals scored.

===== Group 2 =====
Pos	Team	Pld	W	OTW	OTL	L	GF	GA	GD	Pts	Qualification or relegation
1	Glória	7	4	2	1	0	11	3	+8	17	Qualified
2	Passo Fundo	7	4	0	2	1	11	4	+7	14	Qualified
3	Grêmio	7	4	0	1	2	12	6	+6	13	
4	Esportivo	7	3	0	2	2	8	4	+4	11	
5	Novo Hamburgo	7	3	1	0	3	10	8	+2	11	
6	Pelotas	7	2	1	2	2	8	8	0	10	
7	Juventude	7	2	1	2	2	6	7	−1	10	

Updated to match(es) played on March 19, 1989. Source: RSSSF.com
Rules for classification: 1) points; 2) wins; 3) goal difference; 4) number of goals scored.

===== Final quadrangular =====
Pos	Team	Pld	W	OTW	OTL	L	GF	GA	GD	Pts	Qualification or relegation
1	Internacional	3	2	1	0	0	5	2	+3	8	Qualified to Final hexagonal; 3 bonus points
2	Caxias	3	1	0	1	1	2	2	0	4	Qualified to Final hexagonal; 2 bonus points
3	Passo Fundo	3	1	0	0	2	3	5	−2	3	Qualified to Final hexagonal; 1 bonus points
4	Glória	3	0	1	1	1	1	2	−1	3	

Updated to match(es) played on April 15, 1989. Source: RSSSF.com
Rules for classification: 1) points; 2) wins; 3) goal difference; 4) number of goals scored.

==== Second round ====
===== Group 1 =====
Pos	Team	Pld	W	OTW	OTL	L	GF	GA	GD	Pts	Qualification or relegation
1	Aimoré	6	3	2	0	1	6	5	+1	13	Qualified
2	Caxias	6	4	0	0	2	8	3	+5	12	Qualified
3	Santa Cruz	6	3	1	1	1	6	5	+1	12	
4	Internacional de Santa Maria	6	3	0	2	1	6	3	+3	11	
5	Internacional	6	3	0	0	3	10	4	+6	9	
6	Lajeadense	6	1	1	0	4	6	13	−7	5	
7	São Paulo	6	0	0	1	5	1	10	−9	1	

Updated to match(es) played on April 30, 1989. Source: RSSSF.com
Rules for classification: 1) points; 2) wins; 3) goal difference; 4) number of goals scored.

===== Group 2 =====
Pos	Team	Pld	W	OTW	OTL	L	GF	GA	GD	Pts	Qualification or relegation
1	Pelotas	6	4	0	1	1	7	7	0	13	Qualified
2	Grêmio	6	3	0	2	1	14	8	+6	11	Qualified
3	Passo Fundo	6	2	1	2	1	8	7	+1	10	
4	Glória	6	1	2	2	1	6	6	0	9	
5	Juventude	6	1	3	0	2	6	7	−1	9	
6	Esportivo	6	1	2	1	2	7	7	0	8	
7	Novo Hamburgo	6	0	1	1	4	4	9	−5	3	

Updated to match(es) played on April 30, 1989. Source: RSSSF.com
Rules for classification: 1) points; 2) wins; 3) goal difference; 4) number of goals scored.

===== Final quadrangular =====
Pos	Team	Pld	W	OTW	OTL	L	GF	GA	GD	Pts	Qualification or relegation
1	Grêmio	3	1	2	0	0	2	1	+1	7	Qualified to Final hexagonal; 3 bonus points
2	Caxias	3	1	0	2	0	3	1	+2	5	Qualified to Final hexagonal; 2 bonus points
3	Pelotas	3	1	1	0	1	3	3	0	5	Qualified to Final hexagonal; 1 bonus points
4	Aimoré	3	0	0	1	2	0	3	−3	1	

Updated to match(es) played on May 11, 1989. Source: RSSSF.com
Rules for classification: 1) points; 2) wins; 3) goal difference; 4) number of goals scored.

==== Final standings ====
Pos	Team	Pld	W	OTW	OTL	L	GF	GA	GD	Pts	Qualification or relegation
1	Glória	13	5	4	3	1	17	9	+8	26	Qualified
2	Caxias	13	8	0	0	5	17	13	+4	24	Qualified
3	Grêmio	13	7	0	3	3	26	15	+11	24	Qualified
4	Passo Fundo	13	6	1	4	2	19	11	+8	24	Qualified
5	Internacional	13	6	3	0	4	19	8	+11	24	Qualified
6	Aimoré	13	4	5	2	2	9	8	+1	24	Relegation Tournament
7	Pelotas	13	6	1	3	3	15	15	0	23	Qualified
8	Esportivo	13	4	2	4	3	15	11	+4	20	Relegation Tournament
9	Santa Cruz	13	4	3	2	4	10	16	−6	20	Relegation Tournament
10	Juventude	13	3	4	2	4	18	20	−2	19	Relegation Tournament
11	Internacional de Santa Maria	13	4	2	2	5	12	12	0	18	Relegation Tournament
12	Novo Hamburgo	13	3	2	1	7	14	18	−4	14	Relegation Tournament
13	Lajeadense	13	1	1	2	9	11	28	−17	7	Relegation Tournament
14	São Paulo	13	1	1	1	10	6	24	−18	6	Relegation Tournament

Updated to match(es) played on May 11, 1989. Source: RSSSF.com
Rules for classification: 1) points; 2) wins; 3) goal difference; 4) number of goals scored.

=== Relegation tournament ===
Pos	Team	Pld	W	OTW	OTL	L	GF	GA	GD	Pts	Qualification or relegation
1	Juventude	14	9	1	2	2	24	7	+17	31	
2	Esportivo	14	6	2	2	4	11	16	−5	25	
3	Novo Hamburgo	14	4	4	2	4	14	11	+3	22	
4	Lajeadense	14	4	2	5	3	12	9	+3	21	
5	Santa Cruz	14	4	3	3	4	13	17	−4	21	
6	Aimoré	14	3	3	3	5	6	12	−6	20	
7	São Paulo	14	3	4	2	5	7	14	−7	19	Relegated
8	Internacional de Santa Maria	14	2	2	2	8	10	21	−11	7 (Note: Internacional de Santa Maria lost five points for fielding an ineligible player)	Relegated

Updated to match(es) played on August 13, 1989. Source: RSSSF.com
Rules for classification: 1) points; 2) wins; 3) goal difference; 4) number of goals scored.

=== Final hexagonal ===
Pos	Team	Pld	W	OTW	OTL	L	GF	GA	GD	Pts	Qualification or relegation
1	Grêmio	10	6	2	2	0	17	4	+13	27	Champions
2	Internacional	10	6	2	1	1	16	8	+8	26	
3	Caxias	10	2	3	2	3	13	15	−2	18	
4	Glória	10	2	3	1	4	9	15	−6	13	
5	Pelotas	10	2	0	3	5	7	10	−3	10	
6	Passo Fundo	10	0	2	3	5	7	17	−10	8	

Updated to match(es) played on June 18, 1989. Source: RSSSF.com
Rules for classification: 1) points; 2) wins; 3) goal difference; 4) number of goals scored.
