= Tiago Nunes =

Brazilian football manager (born 1980)

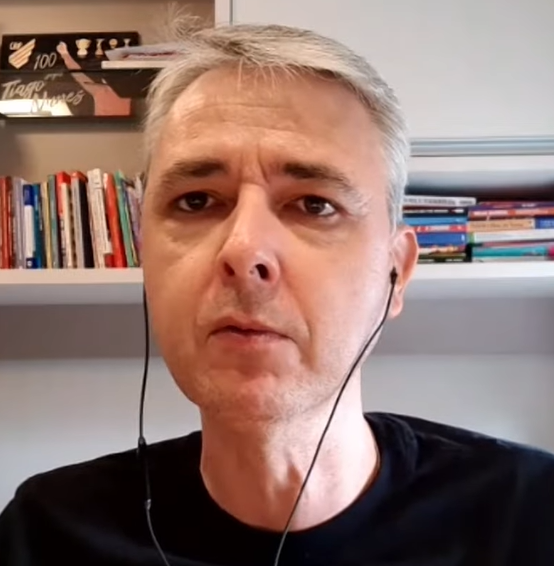
- Nunes in 2021

Personal information
- Full name: Tiago Retzlaff Nunes
- Date of birth: 15 February 1980 (age 46)
- Place of birth: Santa Maria, Brazil
- Height: 1.89 m (6 ft 2 in)

Youth career
- Years: Team
- Riograndense

Managerial career
- 2010: Rio Branco-AC
- 2010: Rio Branco-AC (assistant)
- 2010: Luverdense
- 2011: Sapucaiense
- 2011: Nacional-AM (assistant)
- 2012: Riograndense
- 2012: Bagé
- 2013: União Frederiquense
- 2013–2014: Grêmio U15
- 2014–2015: Juventude U20
- 2015: Brasília U20
- 2016: Ferroviária U20
- 2016: São Paulo-RS
- 2017: Veranópolis
- 2017: Atlético Paranaense U19
- 2018: Atlético Paranaense U23
- 2018: Atlético Paranaense (interim)
- 2019: Athletico Paranaense
- 2019–2020: Corinthians
- 2021: Grêmio
- 2021–2022: Ceará
- 2023: Sporting Cristal
- 2023–2024: Botafogo
- 2024–2025: Universidad Católica
- 2025–2026: LDU Quito

Tiago Retzlaff Nunes (born 15 February 1980) is a Brazilian football coach.

== Career ==
=== Early career ===
Born in Santa Maria, Rio Grande do Sul, Nunes was a youth player at hometown side Riograndense; initially a midfielder, he switched to central defender before ending his playing career due to a knee injury. He then began his career as a fitness coach in the early 2003, and worked at hometown side Inter de Santa Maria, Clube Atlético Camponovense, São Luiz-RS (two spells), Santo Ângelo, Pelotas, Bacabal, Luverdense (two spells) and Novo Horizonte.

Nunes' first managerial experience came in 2010, with Rio Branco-AC, where he won the year's Campeonato Acreano. In June, he became the assistant of Tarcísio Pugliese in the Série C.

On 7 November 2010, Nunes was appointed Luverdense manager in the place of departing Lisca, but was sacked after only three matches. He was subsequently in charge of Sapucaiense, Riograndense, Bagé and União Frederiquense before being named Grêmio's under-15 manager in 2013.

After working for Juventude, Brasília and Ferroviária's under-20 sides, Nunes was announced as São Paulo-RS manager on 3 May 2016. On 17 October, he was named at the helm of Veranópolis for the following campaign.

=== Atlético Paranaense ===
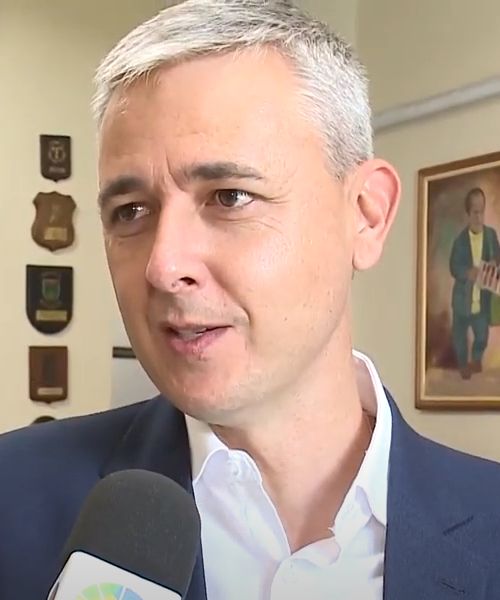
Nunes in 2018

On 21 April 2017, Nunes joined Atlético Paranaense as manager of the under-19 squad. The following 4 January he was appointed manager of the under-23s, and won the year's Campeonato Paranaense. On 27 June 2018, he was named first-team interim manager in the place of Fernando Diniz.

Still an interim, Nunes led the club to an impressive run in the league, finishing seventh (two points shy of a Copa Libertadores qualification spot) and winning the 2018 Copa Sudamericana. On 11 January 2019, he signed a new one-year contract with the club, being definitely appointed as manager.

=== Corinthians ===
On 5 November 2019, Nunes was dismissed after accepting an offer from Corinthians. He was sacked on 11 September 2020 due to poor form and bad results.

=== Grêmio ===
On 21 April 2021, Nunes returned to Grêmio, being appointed first team manager in the place of longtime incumbent Renato Gaúcho. He was dismissed on 4 July, after seven winless league matches.

=== Ceará ===
Nunes took over fellow Brazilian top-tier side Ceará on 30 August 2021. On 25 March 2022, after two eliminations in the Cearense and the Copa do Nordeste, he was sacked.

=== Sporting Cristal ===
On 17 November 2022, Nunes was named manager of Peruvian club Sporting Cristal for the upcoming season. On 11 November 2023, after missing out a place in the finals, he left amidst rumours to take over Botafogo.

=== Botafogo ===
On 16 November 2023, Nunes was named head coach of Botafogo on a contract until 2025. He was sacked the following 22 February, after a 1–1 draw against Bolivian club Aurora.

=== Universidad Católica ===
On 22 March 2024, Nunes was announced as manager of Chilean Primera División side Universidad Católica. He was sacked the following 25 May, with the club in the eighth place.

=== LDU Quito ===
On 6 June 2025, Nunes switched teams and countries again, after being presented as manager of LDU Quito in Ecuador. On 16 July 2026, the club announced his dismissal.

== Managerial statistics ==
As of 17 July 2026

Managerial record by team and tenure
Team	Nat.	From	To	Record								Ref
Team	Nat.	From	To	G	W	D	L	GF	GA	GD	Win %	Ref
Rio Branco	(Brazil)	January 2010	5 June 2010	13	11	1	1	40	17	+23	84.62	
Luverdense	(Brazil)	7 November 2010	22 November 2010	3	1	2	0	2	1	+1	33.33	
Sapucaiense	(Brazil)	15 December 2010	12 May 2011	18	5	5	8	15	22	−7	27.78	
Riograndense	(Brazil)	24 September 2011	10 June 2012	24	9	6	9	35	29	+6	37.50	
Bagé	(Brazil)	23 June 2012	4 November 2012	12	5	2	5	14	8	+6	41.67	
União Frederiquense	(Brazil)	5 November 2012	14 April 2013	5	0	4	1	3	5	−2	0.00	
São Paulo-RS	(Brazil)	3 May 2016	12 September 2016	10	4	2	4	12	13	−1	40.00	
Veranópolis	(Brazil)	17 October 2016	21 April 2017	13	3	6	4	9	15	−6	23.08	
Athletico Paranaense	(Brazil)	27 June 2018	5 November 2019	102	53	24	25	156	81	+75	51.96	
Corinthians	(Brazil)	1 January 2020	11 September 2020	26	9	10	7	32	25	+7	34.62	
Grêmio	(Brazil)	21 April 2021	4 July 2021	20	10	5	5	38	19	+19	50.00	
Ceará	(Brazil)	30 August 2021	25 March 2022	32	14	11	7	38	22	+16	43.75	
Sporting Cristal	(Peru)	1 January 2023	11 November 2023	48	23	18	7	78	45	+33	47.92	
Botafogo	(Brazil)	16 November 2023	22 February 2024	15	4	7	4	19	17	+2	26.67	
Universidad Católica	(Chile)	22 March 2024	25 May 2025	46	19	10	17	69	55	+14	41.30	
LDU Quito	(Ecuador)	6 June 2025	16 July 2026	65	33	13	19	96	59	+37	50.77	
Career total				452	203	126	123	656	433	+223	44.91	—

== Honours ==
Rio Branco-AC

- Campeonato Acreano: 2010

Athletico Paranaense

- Campeonato Paranaense: 2018
- Copa Sudamericana: 2018
- J.League Cup / Copa Sudamericana Championship: 2019
- Copa do Brasil: 2019

Grêmio

- Campeonato Gaúcho: 2021
- Recopa Gaúcha: 2021
