= 1966 Campeonato Gaúcho =

Campeonato Gaúcho
- Season: 1966
- Dates: 17 July – 18 December
- Champions: Grêmio (17th title)
- Taça Brasil: Grêmio
- Matches: 132
- Goals: 311 (2.36 per match)
- Top goalscorer: Sapiranga (13 goals)

The 1966 Campeonato Gaúcho was the 46th season of Rio Grande do Sul's top association football league. Grêmio won their 17th title.

== Format ==
The championship was contested by the twelve teams in a double round-robin system, with the team with the most points winning the title and qualifying to the 1967 Taça Brasil. The last placed team was relegated to the 1967 Second Division.

== Teams ==
Club	Location	Titles	Last season
Aimoré	São Leopoldo	0	11th
Brasil	Pelotas	1	5th
Farroupilha	Pelotas	1	10th
Flamengo^{A}	Caxias do Sul	0	9th
Floriano^{B}	Novo Hamburgo	0	3rd
Grêmio	Porto Alegre	16	1st
Guarany	Bagé	2	6th
Internacional	Porto Alegre	16	4th
Juventude	Caxias do Sul	0	2nd
Pelotas	Pelotas	1	7th
Riograndense	Rio Grande	0	1st (Second Division)
Rio Grande	Rio Grande	1	8th

A. Caxias was known as Flamengo until 1971.
B. Novo Hamburgo was known as Floriano from 1942 until 1968.

== Championship ==
Pos	Team	Pld	W	D	L	GF	GA	GD	Pts	Qualification or relegation
1	Grêmio (C)	22	16	3	3	40	15	+25	35	Qualification to 1967 Taça Brasil
2	Internacional	22	12	8	2	24	12	+12	32	
3	Juventude	22	12	5	5	28	16	+12	29	
4	Aimoré	22	8	7	7	17	14	+3	23	
5	Pelotas	22	9	4	9	26	25	+1	22	
6	Floriano	22	7	7	8	35	32	+3	21	
7	Farroupilha	22	9	3	10	30	31	−1	21	
8	Brasil	22	7	5	10	25	28	−3	19	
9	Rio Grande	22	5	6	11	27	38	−11	16	
10	Riograndense (RG)	22	3	10	9	20	34	−14	16	
11	Guarany (BA)	22	3	9	10	19	35	−16	15	
12	Flamengo (Note: It is unknown which tie-breaker criteria were used for ranking Guarany and Flamengo.) (R)	22	5	5	12	20	31	−11	15	Relegated

(C) Champions; (R) Relegated
