= Bebeto Canhão =

Brazilian footballer

Bebeto
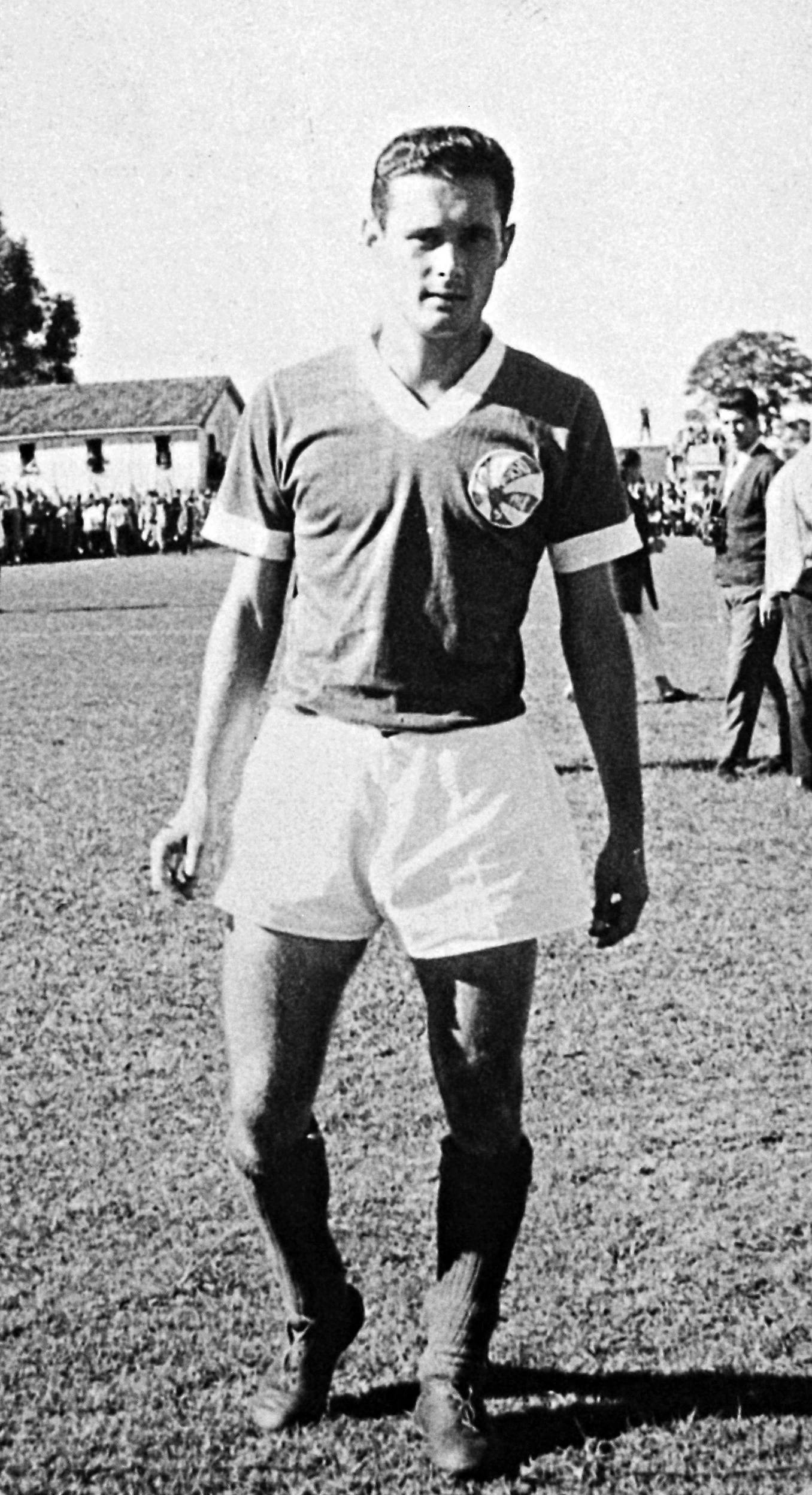

Personal information
- Full name: Alberto Vilasboas dos Reis
- Date of birth: 7 September 1946
- Place of birth: Soledade, Brazil
- Date of death: 18 September 2003 (aged 57)
- Place of death: Passo Fundo, Brazil
- Height: 1.76 m (5 ft 9 in)
- Position: Forward

Senior career*
Years	Team	Apps	(Gls)
1966–1967	14 de Julho-PF		
1967–1968	Gaúcho		
1968	Corinthians		
1968	Internacional		
1969	Gaúcho		
1969	America-RJ		
1970–1971	Grêmio		
1971	Bahia		
1971–1976	Gaúcho		
1976	Caxias		
1976	Internacional		
1977–1979	Caxias		
1979	Juventude		
1980	Caxias		
1980	Gaúcho		
1980–1981	Inter de Santa Maria		
1981	Gaúcho		
1981	Toledo		
1982	Gaúcho		
1983	14 de Julho-PF		
1984	Gaúcho		
1985	14 de Julho-PF		
1985	Gaúcho		
- * Club domestic league appearances and goals as of 28 October 2023

Alberto Vilasboas dos Reis (7 September 1946 – 18 September 2003), better known as Bebeto or Bebeto Canhão, was a Brazilian professional footballer who played as a forward.

== Career ==
Bebeto was successful playing for teams in the state of Rio Grande do Sul, especially SC Gaúcho, where he is the biggest top scorer with 255 goals, and at SER Caxias, where he was featured in the Brazilian Championship in the late 70s.

== Honours ==
Bahia

- Campeonato Baiano: 1971

Gaúcho

- Campeonato Gaúcho Série A2: 1984

Individual

- Campeonato Gaúcho top scorer: 1973, 1975

== Death ==
Bebeto died on 18 September 2003 of hepatitis C.
