= Dino Sani =

Brazilian football player and coach (1932–2026)

- Sani during the 1962–63 season

Personal information
- Date of birth: 23 May 1932
- Place of birth: São Paulo, Brazil
- Date of death: 15 November 2026 (aged 94)
- Place of death: São Paulo, Brazil
- Position: Midfielder

Senior career*
Years	Team	Apps	(Gls)
1950–1951	Palmeiras		
1951	XV de Jaú		
1952–1953	Comercial-SP		
1954–1960	São Paulo		
1961	Boca Juniors	14	(4)
1961–1964	AC Milan	63	(14)
1965–1968	Corinthians		

International career
1957–1966	Brazil	15	(1)

Managerial career
- 1969–1970: Corinthians
- 1971–1974: Internacional
- 1974: Goiás
- 1975: Corinthians
- 1975: Palmeiras
- 1976: Coritiba
- 1977–1980: Peñarol
- 1981: Flamengo
- 1982: Fluminense
- 1982: Ponte Preta
- 1983–1984: Internacional
- 1984: Boca Juniors
- 1985: Coritiba
- 1989–1990: Qatar
- 1991–1992: Grêmio
Medal record
Men's Football
Representing Brazil
FIFA World Cup
Winner	1958 Sweden
- * Club domestic league appearances and goals

Dino Sani (Brazilian Portuguese: [ˈdʒinu ˈsɐni], Italian: [ˈdiːno ˈsaːni]; 23 May 1932 – 15 November 2026) was a Brazilian football player and coach who played as a midfielder.

== Career ==
The son of Italian immigrants, Gaetano Sani and Maria Gabrielli, Sani started his career at local club Palmeiras, XV de Jaú, Comercial-SP and São Paulo FC, and played in the Argentine First Division for Boca Juniors in 1961, where he played 13 games, scoring 4 goals. He then played in Italy for Serie A club AC Milan, with whom he won one scudetto in the 1961–62 season, followed by the 1962–63 European Cup.

As a member of the Brazil national team, Dino Sani participated at the South American Championship tournaments of 1957 in Peru and 1959 in Argentina, reaching the final on both occasions; he was also part of the squad that won the 1958 World Cup in Sweden. He made 15 appearances in total for Brazil between 1957 and 1966, scoring 1 goal. As of 2026, he was the oldest-living World Cup winner.

After he left Milan in 1964, Sani returned to South America, and played for Corinthians before becoming a coach. He managed Internacional, Goiás, Palmeiras, Coritiba, Peñarol, Flamengo, Fluminense, Boca Juniors, Qatar and Grêmio.

== Death ==
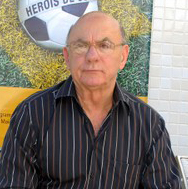
Sani in 2008

On 15 November 2026, it was announced on the CBF official X account that Sani had died earlier that day. He was 94.

== Managerial statistics ==
Managerial record by team and tenure
Team	From	To	Record							
Team	From	To	G	W	D	L	GF	GA	GD	Win %
Corinthians	1 January 1969	4 January 1971	89	39	27	23	131	83	+48	43.82
Internacional	10 January 1971	2 January 1974	175	99	54	22	264	108	+156	56.57
Goiás	4 January 1974	23 September 1974	41	12	16	13	46	40	+6	29.27
Corinthians	12 June 1975	13 August 1975	10	4	3	3	10	11	−1	40.00
Palmeiras	14 August 1975	7 May 1976	44	15	21	8	57	42	+15	34.09
Coritiba	21 July 1976	9 December 1976	29	13	9	7	27	20	+7	44.83
Peñarol	2 January 1977	30 June 1980	103	63	24	16	203	86	+117	61.17
Puebla	1 July 1980	29 March 1981	23	7	10	6	27	31	−4	30.43
Flamengo	8 April 1981	19 July 1981	18	10	6	2	42	18	+24	55.56
Fluminense	5 October 1981	11 May 1982	32	16	7	9	62	34	+28	50.00
Ponte Preta	25 May 1982	21 September 1982	18	5	9	4	20	14	+6	27.78
Internacional	22 March 1983	27 March 1984	52	20	27	5	61	28	+33	38.46
Boca Juniors	12 May 1984	25 October 1984	21	7	6	8	18	22	−4	33.33
Coritiba	5 January 1985	8 February 1985	4	2	0	2	6	7	−1	50.00
Qatar	1 July 1985	2 April 1986	8	1	4	3	6	9	−3	12.50
Tokyo Verdy	1 July 1986	30 June 1989	92	45	27	20	137	74	+63	48.91
Qatar	1 October 1989	4 January 1990	5	1	3	1	4	5	−1	20.00
Grêmio	20 March 1991	3 June 1991	20	6	7	7	18	19	−1	30.00
Ponte Preta	8 March 1995	31 March 1995	7	1	1	5	6	16	−10	14.29
Career total			793	366	261	166	1,145	667	+478	46.15

== Honours ==
=== Player ===
Palmeiras

- Campeonato Paulista: 1950

São Paulo

- Campeonato Paulista: 1957

AC Milan

- Serie A: 1961–62
- European Cup: 1962–63

Corinthians

- Torneio Rio–São Paulo: 1966

Brazil

- FIFA World Cup: 1958
- Copa América runner-up: 1957, 1959

Individual

- AC Milan Hall of Fame
- São Paulo FC Hall of Fame

=== Manager ===
Internacional

- Campeonato Gaúcho: 1971, 1972, 1973

Peñarol

- Uruguayan Primera División: 1978, 1979

World Cup-winners status
Preceded by Mário Zagallo	Oldest Living Player; 5 January 2024 – 15 November 2026	Succeeded by Pepe
