= Ryuta Takahashi =

Japanese footballer

Ryuta Takahashi 髙橋 隆大
Personal information
- Date of birth: 30 October 2004 (age 22)
- Place of birth: Kyoto Prefecture, Japan
- Height: 1.56 m (5 ft 1 in)
- Position: Right winger

Team information
- Current team: União Frederiquense (on loan)

Youth career
- 2019: Gamba Osaka
- 2020–2022: Shizuoka Gakuen High School
- 2022: Gamba Osaka

Senior career*
Years	Team	Apps	(Gls)
2023–2024	Gamba Osaka	0	(0)
2023	→ Nara Club (loan)	1	(0)
2024	→ Giravanz Kitakyushu (loan)	14	(0)
2025–	Guarani	1	(0)
2026	→ Pouso Alegre (loan)	8	(0)
2026–	→ União Frederiquense (loan)	0	(0)
- * Club domestic league appearances and goals as of 16 July 2026

Ryuta Takahashi (in Japanese: 髙橋 隆大, Takahashi Ryūta, born 30 October 2004) is a Japanese professional footballer who plays as right winger for the Brazilian club União Frederiquense, on loan from Guarani.

== Career ==
Having started his career at Gamba Osaka, Takahashi played on loan for the 2023 seasons with Nara Club and 2024 with Giravanz Kitakyushu, both in the J3 League. In March 2025, he was signed on a free transfer by Guarani FC, initially for the secondary team's role in the Copa Paulista. After eight standout performances, he was integrated into the main squad for the 2025 Campeonato Brasileiro Série C, making his debut in the derby against Ponte Preta. On August 21, the contract renewal was announced until 2027. In 2026, Takahashi was loaned to Pouso Alegre for the 2026 Campeonato Mineiro, and in the second half of the year to União Frederiquense for the Rio Grande do Sul Série A2.
