= Mateo Velasco =

Colombian footballer (born 2002)

Personal information
- Full name: Mateo Velasco Díaz
- Date of birth: 31 July 2002 (age 24)
- Place of birth: Bogotá, Colombia
- Height: 1.80 m (5 ft 11 in)
- Position: Midfielder

Team information
- Current team: Deportes Quindío
- Number: 32

Youth career
- Cortuluá
- 2020–2021: → Grêmio (loan)
- 2021–2023: Grêmio

Senior career*
Years	Team	Apps	(Gls)
2023–2024	Grêmio	0	(0)
2023	→ Aimoré (loan)	5	(0)
2025-	Deportes Quindío		
- * Club domestic league appearances and goals as of 30 August 2023

Mateo Velasco Díaz (born 31 July 2002) is a Colombian footballer who plays as a midfielder for Colombian side Deportes Quindío.

== Club career ==
Born in the Colombian capital of Bogotá, Velasco began his career with Cortuluá. In late 2019, he and teammate Kener Valencia travelled to Spain to trial with La Liga side Valencia. A year after his return to Colombia, in October 2020, he was loaned to Brazilian side Grêmio on a one-year loan deal with a purchase option. In August 2021, this move was made permanent, and Velasco signed a four-year contract.

In December 2022, Campeonato Brasileiro Série D side Aimoré announced the signing of Velasco on loan for the 2023 season. Having strained his medial collateral ligament, he returned to training with Aimoré in January 2023.

== Career statistics ==
=== Club ===
As of 30 August 2023.

Appearances and goals by club, season and competition
Club	Season	League			State League		Cup		Continental		Other		Total	
Club	Season	Division	Apps	Goals	Apps	Goals	Apps	Goals	Apps	Goals	Apps	Goals	Apps	Goals
Grêmio	2023	Série A	0	0	0	0	0	0	0	0	0	0	0	0
Aimoré (loan)	2023	Série D	0	0	5 (Note: Appearances in the Campeonato Gaúcho)	0	0	0	–		0	0	5	0
Career total			0	0	5	0	0	0	0	0	0	0	5	0
