= Esporte Clube Mundo Novo =

Mundo Novo
- Full name: Esporte Clube Mundo Novo
- Founded: 24 August 1934; 90 years ago
- Ground: Armindo Volkart; Três Coroas, Rio Grande do Sul, Brazil
- Capacity: 500
- President: Rogério Faiffer
- Head Coach: Márcio Abreu
Home colors	Away colors

Esporte Clube Mundo Novo, commonly known as just Mundo Novo, is a Brazilian professional football club based in Três Coroas, Rio Grande do Sul, founded on August 24, 1934, their colors being blue and white. Currently has no professional team, which has had in the last century, having played Campeonato Gaúcho Segunda Divisão (third state division) during the 60s, 70s and 80s. His best performance was in 1981, when it was runner-up. In previous decades, also competed in the now defunct Campeonato Citadino de Taquara (municipal championship). There are plans to re-activate the professional team in 2017.

Currently playing only academy championships, being his most important team the under-17s squad, which currently plays in the second division of Campeonato Gaúcho Sub-17.

== Honours ==
- Campeonato Gaúcho Série B
  - Runners-up (1): 1981

== Club officials ==
- President: Rogério Faiffer
- Vice-president: Rodrigo Viacava
- Director of football: Orneide Tondin
- Director of marketing: Nico
- Supervisor: Guto
- Head coach: Márcio Abreu
- Assistant coach: Roger Lima
- Fitness coach: Sydmar
- Goalkeeper coach: Felipe Padilha
- Massagist: Cléo Magero
