= Arena Wolmar Salton =

Stadium under construction in Brazil

- Interactive map of Arena Wolmar Salton
- Full name: Arena Wolmar Salton
- Former names: Arena do Gaúcho; Arena BSBIOS
- Location: Passo Fundo, Brazil
- Coordinates: 28.2747°S 52.4393°W
- Owner: Sport Club Gaúcho
- Capacity: 8,000
- Surface: Grass
- Field size: 105 x 68 m

Construction
- Groundbreaking: December 13, 2013
- Opened: April 3, 2016

Tenant
- Sport Club Gaúcho

The Arena Wolmar Salton also Arena Gaúcho called, is a stadium under construction belonging to the Sport Club Gaúcho football club, located in the city of Passo Fundo, in the state of Rio Grande do Sul.

== History ==
After a turbulent period, with the attachment of their old stadium due to an accident involving a fan and successive poor results in the field, the Gaucho was no place to send their games and was in danger of closing its activities.

About to lose one of the most traditional clubs in the city, there was great commitment of Passo Fundo and City Hall community to reverse the situation, in 2012 land was donated to alvi-green club by the municipal administration for the construction of a new stadium, located funds Gymnasium Teixeirinha with cornerstone was laid on December 13, 2013.

With the money raised from the sale of Estádio Wolmar Salton, debts were settled and part of the money was intended for the construction of the new arena. Begun in 2013, the Arena Wolmar Salton will have capacity for 8,000 spectators, having press cabins and lawn in official size, 105 x 68 m, with this drainage and irrigation system already installed.

The forecast of the club is the new Arena is inaugurated in 2015 at the beginning of the Campeonato Gaúcho Série B contest.
