= Esporte Clube Nacional =

Nacional
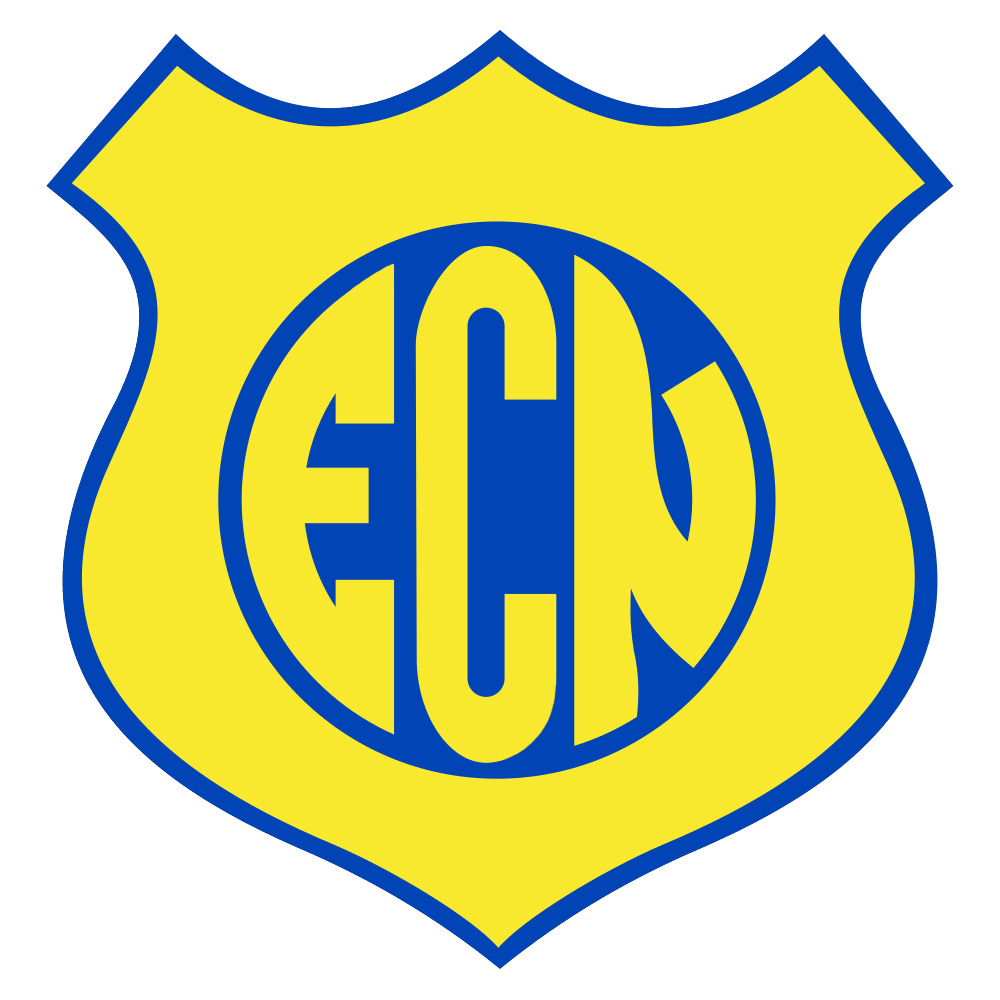
- Full name: Esporte Clube Nacional
- Nickname(s): Leão da Serra
- Founded: March 17, 1941
- Ground: Estádio do Morro dos Ventos Uivantes, Cruz Alta, Rio Grande do Sul state, Brazil
- Capacity: 1,200
Home colours	Away colours

Esporte Clube Nacional, commonly known as Nacional, is a Brazilian football club based in Cruz Alta, Rio Grande do Sul state.

== History ==
The club was founded on March 17, 1941. They won the Campeonato Gaúcho Second Level in 1957.

== Honours ==
=== State ===
- Campeonato Gaúcho Série A2
  - Winners (1): 1957

=== City ===
- Campeonato Citadino de Cruz Alta
  - Winners (13): 1943, 1944, 1947, 1948, 1949, 1950, 1952, 1953, 1957, 1959, 1960, 1961, 1971

== Stadium ==
Esporte Clube Nacional play their home games at Estádio do Morro dos Ventos Uivantes. The stadium has a maximum capacity of 1,200 people.
