= União Frederiquense de Futebol =

Association football club in Brazil

União Frederiquense
- Full name: União Frederiquense de Futebol
- Nicknames: União; Leão da Colina
- Founded: August 3, 2010; 16 years ago
- Ground: Estádio Vermelhão da Colina
- Capacity: 4,000
Home colors	Away colors

União Frederiquense de Futebol, commonly referred to as União Frederiquense, is a Brazilian football club based in Frederico Westphalen, Rio Grande do Sul. It currently plays in Campeonato Gaúcho Série A1, the top level of the Rio Grande do Sul state football league.

== History ==
The club was founded on September 3, 2010. They competed for the first time in a professional competition in 2011, when they were eliminated in the Third Stage in the Campeonato Gaúcho Second Level. They won the 2021 Campeonato Gaúcho Série A2 and earned promotion to the top division.

== Stadium ==
União Frederiquense de Futebol play their home games at Estádio João Pastre, commonly known as Estádio Vermelhão da Colina. The stadium has a maximum capacity of 4,000 people.

== Honours ==
- Copa Serrana
  - Winners (1): 2015
- Campeonato Gaúcho Série A2
  - Winners (1): 2021
