= Esporte Clube Guarani =

Guarani de Venâncio Aires
- Full name: Esporte Clube Guarani
- Nicknames: Guara; Rubro-Negro; Time Índio
- Founded: 3 September 1929
- Ground: Estádio Edmundo Feix
- Capacity: 4,000
- League: Campeonato Gaúcho Série A2
- Website: http://www.guaranirs.com.br/
Home colours	Away colours

Esporte Clube Guarani, commonly referred to as Guarani de Venâncio Aires, is a Brazilian football club based in Venâncio Aires, Rio Grande do Sul. It currently plays in Campeonato Gaúcho Série A2, the second level of the Rio Grande do Sul state football league.

== History ==
Found 3 September 1929 as Sociedade de Foot-Ball Sport Club Guarany.

== Honours ==
- Copa FGF
  - Runners-up (1): 2014
- Campeonato Gaúcho Série A2
  - Runners-up (3): 1990, 2006, 2015
- Campeonato Gaúcho Série B
  - Winners (1): 2025
  - Runners-up (1): 2014

== Recent results ==
Seasons	State League	Positions	State Cup	National Cup
2002	First Level	4th of Group B (8 teams in 2 groups)		Did not qualify
2003	First Level	10th (total 18 teams)		First round (round of 64)
2004	First Level	12th (total 14 teams)	Did not play	Did not qualify
2005	First Level	6th of Group 3 (18 teams in 3 groups)	First round	Did not qualify
2006	Second Level	2nd (Promoted)	Did not play	Did not qualify
2007	First Level	8th of Group 2 (18 teams in 2 groups)	Did not play	Did not qualify
2008	Second Level	5th	Round of 16	Did not qualify
2009	Second Level	Did not play	Did not play	Did not qualify
2010	Second Level	7th of Group 3 (26 teams in 3 groups)	Did not play	Did not qualify
2011	Second Level	13th (second round)	Did not play	Did not qualify
2012	Second Level	9th of Group 1 (20 teams in 2 groups)	Did not play	Did not qualify
2013	Third Level	5th	Did not play	Did not qualify
2014	Third Level	2nd	First round	Did not qualify
2015	Second Level	2nd	Did not play	Did not qualify
2016	Second Level	7th	Did not play	Did not qualify
2017	Second Level	10th	Did not play	Did not qualify
2018	Second Level	13th	Did not play	Did not qualify
2019	Second Level	13th	Did not play	Did not qualify
