= Sport Club Guarany =

Guarany
- Full name: Sport Club Guarany
- Nickname(s): Jequitibá da Serra; Rei da Campanha
- Founded: September 20, 1913
- Ground: Estádio Taba Índia, Cruz Alta, Rio Grande do Sul state, Brazil
- Capacity: 10,000
| Home colours | Away colours |

Sport Club Guarany, also known as Guarany, is a Brazilian football club based in Cruz Alta, Rio Grande do Sul state.

== History ==
The club was founded on September 20, 1913. They won the Campeonato Gaúcho Second Level in 1954, 1955 and in 1987, and the Campeonato Gaúcho Third Level in 1985.

In 1971, the team merged with local rivals Nacional to form the Associação Cruz Alta de Futebol, also known as ACAFOL. the merger ended in 1973.

== Honours ==
=== State ===
- Campeonato Gaúcho Série A2
  - Winners (3): 1954, 1955, 1987
- Campeonato Gaúcho Série B
  - Winners (1): 1985

=== City ===
- Campeonato Citadino de Cruz Alta
  - Winners (16): 1916, 1921, 1922, 1924, 1925, 1926, 1927, 1946, 1951, 1954, 1955, 1956, 1958, 1962, 1963, 1966

== Stadium ==
Sport Club Guarany play their home games at Estádio Taba Índia. The stadium has a maximum capacity of 10,000 people.
