= Football Club Rio-Grandense =

Rio-Grandense
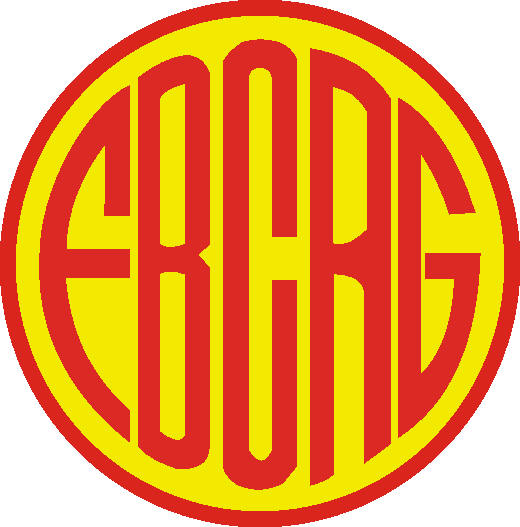
- Full name: Football Club Rio-Grandense
- Founded: July 11, 1909
- Ground: Colosso do Trevo, Rio Grande, Rio Grande do Sul state, Brazil
- Capacity: 15,000
- League: Campeonato Gaúcho Segunda Divisão
- 2004: 26th
Home colours	Away colours

Football Club Rio-Grandense, commonly known as Rio-Grandense, is a Brazilian football club based in Rio Grande, Rio Grande do Sul and part of state league competition in the state of Rio Grande do Sul. They won the Campeonato Gaúcho in 1939.

== History ==
The club was founded on July 11, 1909. They won the Campeonato Gaúcho in 1939. and the Campeonato do Interior Gaúcho in 1939 and 1946. The club last participated in the Campeonato Gaúcho in 1985, and has taken a hiatus in league competitions since 2004.

== Honours ==
=== State ===
- Campeonato Gaúcho
  - Winners (1): 1939
  - Runners-up (3): 1937, 1938, 1946
- Campeonato Gaúcho Série A2
  - Winners (1): 1965
- Campeonato do Interior Gaúcho
  - Winners (3): 1937, 1938, 1946
- Copa Cícero Soares
  - Winners (1): 1973

=== City ===
- Campeonato Citadino de Rio Grande
  - Winners (20): 1921, 1937, 1938, 1939, 1940, 1946, 1947, 1948, 1950, 1953, 1955, 1956, 1957, 1960, 1963, 1974, 1975, 1976, 1977, 1978.

== Stadium ==
Rio-Grandense play their home games at Estádio Torquato Pontes, also known as Colosso do Trevo. The stadium has a maximum capacity of 15,000 people.
