= Clube Atlético Carazinho =

Atlético Carazinho
- Full name: Clube Atlético Carazinho
- Nickname(s): Galo da Serra
- Founded: 1 July 1970
- Ground: Estádio Paulo Coutinho, Carazinho, Brazil
- Capacity: 10,000
Home colours	Away colours

Clube Atlético Carazinho, commonly known as Atlético Carazinho, is a Brazilian football club based in Carazinho and part of state league competition in the state of Rio Grande do Sul.

== History ==
The club was founded on 1 July 1970 as a result of a merger between local rivals Grêmio Atlético Glória and Veterano Futebol Clube (both founded in 1933). They won the Campeonato do Interior Gaúcho in 1974 and the Série A2 in 1994.

== Honours ==
- Campeonato Gaúcho Série A2
  - Winners (1): 1994
- Campeonato do Interior Gaúcho
  - Winners (1): 1974

== Stadium ==
Clube Atlético Carazinho play their home games at Estádio Paulo Coutinho. The stadium has a maximum capacity of 10,000 people.
