= Grêmio Esportivo Glória =

Glória
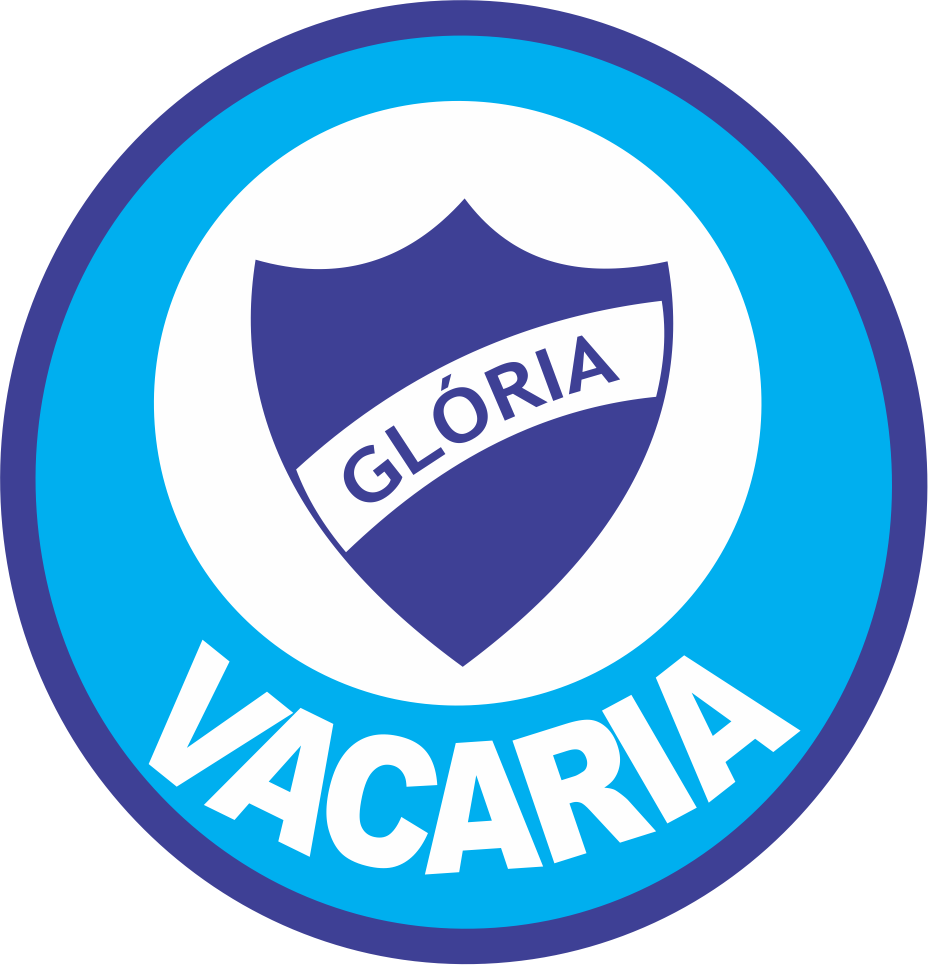
- Full name: Grêmio Esportivo Glória
- Nickname(s): Leão da Serra
- Founded: November 15, 1956
- President: Décio Peixoto Camargo
- Head coach: Alê Menezes
| Home colors | Away colors |

Grêmio Esportivo Glória, commonly referred to as Glória, is a Brazilian football club based in Vacaria, Rio Grande do Sul. It currently plays in Campeonato Gaúcho Série A2, the second level of the Rio Grande do Sul state football league.

== History ==
The club was founded on November 15, 1956. They won the Campeonato Gaúcho Second Level in 1988 and Copa FGF in 2021.

== Honours ==
- Copa FGF
  - Winners (1): 2021
- Recopa Gaúcha
  - Runners-up (1): 2022
- Campeonato Gaúcho Série A2
  - Winners (2): 1988, 2015

== Stadium ==
Grêmio Esportivo Glória play their home games at Estádio Altos da Glória. The stadium has a maximum capacity of 8,000 people.
