= Riograndense Futebol Clube =

Brazilian football club

Riograndense
- Full name: Riograndense Futebol Clube
- Nickname(s): Periquito; Esmeraldino; Time da Zona Norte; Time dos Ferroviários
- Founded: 7 May 1912
- Ground: Estádio dos Eucaliptos, Santa Maria, Brazil
- Capacity: 4,000
Home colours	Away colours

Riograndense Futebol Clube, commonly known as Riograndense, is a Brazilian football club based in Santa Maria, Rio Grande do Sul and part of state league competition in the state of Rio Grande do Sul.

== History ==
The club was founded on 7 May 1912. They won the Campeonato do Interior Gaúcho in 1921, and the Campeonato Gaúcho Série A2 in 1978, beating Cachoeira.

== Honours ==
=== State ===
- Campeonato Gaúcho
  - Runners-up (1): 1921
- Campeonato Gaúcho Série A2
  - Winners (1): 1978
- Campeonato Gaúcho Série B
  - Runners-up (1): 2003
- Campeonato do Interior Gaúcho
  - Winners (1): 1921

=== City ===
- Campeonato Citadino de Santa Maria
  - Winners (38): 1913, 1918, 1919, 1920, 1921, 1922, 1923, 1924, 1926, 1927, 1928, 1929, 1930, 1931, 1932, 1933, 1935, 1936, 1937, 1938, 1939, 1940, 1941 1943, 1947, 1948, 1952, 1953, 1956, 1957, 1958, 1959, 1960, 1963, 1964, 1971, 1974, 1976

== Stadium ==
Riograndense Futebol Clube play their home games at Estádio dos Eucaliptos. The stadium has a maximum capacity of 5,000 people.
