= Sport Club Gaúcho =

Gaúcho
- Full name: Sport Club Gaúcho
- Nicknames: Periquito do Boqueirão; O mais querido da cidade
- Founded: May 12, 1918
- Ground: Arena Wolmar Salton; Passo Fundo, Brazil
- Capacity: 8,000
- President: Gilmar Rosso
- Head Coach: Ricardo Atollini
- League: Campeonato Gaúcho Série A2
- 2025: Gaúcho Série A2, 14th of 15
- Website: https://sportclubgauchopassofundo.blogspot.com/
Home colors	Away colors

Sport Club Gaúcho , also known as Gaúcho, is a Brazilian soccer club based in Passo Fundo, Brazil.

== History ==
This club was founded on May 12, 1918 to serve the central plateau in the northern region of Rio Grande do Sul. Gaúcho won twice the lower divisions of the Campeonato Gaúcho (the Rio Grande do Sul state league), in 1966 and 1977.

== Honours ==
=== State ===
- Copa FGF
  - Runners-up (2): 2004, 2018
- Campeonato Gaúcho Série A2
  - Champions (3): 1966, 1977, 1984
- Campeonato Gaúcho Série B
  - Champions (1): 2000

=== City ===
- Campeonato Citadino de Passo Fundo
  - Winners (16): 1926, 1927, 1928, 1939, 1948, 1949, 1950, 1954, 1961, 1963, 1964, 1965, 1966, 1967, 1968, 1970
- Torneio Relâmpago do Campeonato Citadino
  - Winners (2): 1947, 1948
- Torneio Início do Campeonato Citadino
  - Winners (8): 1926, 1940, 1946, 1948, 1949, 1950, 1951, 1965

== Stadium ==
Gaúcho play their home games at Arena Wolmar Salton. The stadium has a maximum capacity of 8,000 people.

== Rankings ==
CBF

- Place: 360th
- Score: 1 point

FGF

- Place: 20th
- Score: 360 points

== Rivalry ==
Gaúcho's principal rivalry is with Esporte Clube Passo Fundo, against whom they play in the "Planalto Médio Derby".
