= Guarany Futebol Clube =

Brazilian football club

Guarany de Bagé
- Full name: Guarany Futebol Clube
- Nicknames: Alvirrubro; Índio
- Founded: 19 April 1907; 119 years ago
- Ground: Estrela D'Alva
- Capacity: 10,000 (4,000 depending on restrictions)
- Chairman: Ademar Batistella
- Manager: William Campos
- League: Campeonato Brasileiro Série D Campeonato Gaúcho
- 2025 2025: Série D, 35th of 64; Gaúcho, 7th of 12
Home colours	Away colours	Third colours

Guarany Futebol Clube, commonly referred to as Guarany de Bagé, is a Brazilian football club based in Bagé, Rio Grande do Sul. It currently plays in Campeonato Gaúcho Série A, the top tier of the Rio Grande do Sul state football league, and the Campeonato Brasileiro Série D. Guarany is one of the oldest and most traditional football clubs in the state of Rio Grande do Sul, as the oldest club there, Sport Club Rio Grande, was founded in 1900, seven years before Guarany was.

== History ==
On April 19, 1907, Guarany was founded by eleven friends at Praça da Matriz (Matriz Square). The club was supposed to be called "Internacional", but it ended up named after Carlos Gomes' Il Guarany. Carlos Garrastazú, one of the club's founders, was Guarany's first president.

In 1920, Guarany won the second edition of the Campeonato Gaúcho, being the first Gaúcho club to win a title with a black player on field. Their famous second Gauchão title was conquered later on 1938. The reason for the fame is that the club remains the only to win two editions of the Gauchão and the third most victorious of the competition outside the Grenal duo. Besides, Guarany also won the Campeonato Gaúcho Second Division in 1969 and 2006 and the Campeonato Gaúcho Third Division in other three occasions, being one of the three teams of Rio Grande do Sul to win all three state divisions, together with Sport Club Rio Grande and Esporte Clube Cruzeiro. Apart from those titles, Guarany has won the Campeonato Gaúcho do Interior 6 times, which is the title given to the club outside the Grenal duo that has the best performance in the state league, and the Bagé town championship 28 times, being the biggest champion of the competition, although only ahead of their rival GE Bagé (23 titles) and the no longer existing Grêmio Sportivo Ferroviário (1 title).

== Honours ==
=== Official tournaments ===
State
Competitions	Titles	Seasons
Campeonato Gaúcho	2	1920, 1938
Campeonato Gaúcho Série A2	2	1969, 2006
Campeonato Gaúcho Série B	3	1999, 2016, 2019

- record

=== Others tournaments ===
==== State ====
- Campeonato do Interior Gaúcho (6): 1920, 1926, 1929, 1938, 1958, 1962

==== City ====
- Campeonato Citadino de Bagé (28): 1918, 1919, 1920, 1921, 1926, 1929, 1932, 1934, 1935, 1938, 1943, 1945, 1946, 1947, 1948, 1950, 1956, 1958, 1960, 1961, 1964, 1965, 1966, 1969, 1970, 1971, 2010, 2012

=== Runners-up ===
- Campeonato Gaúcho (3): 1926, 1929, 1958
- Campeonato Gaúcho Série A2 (3): 1988, 2021, 2023
- Campeonato Gaúcho Série B (1): 2015

== Rival ==
Guarany's greatest rival is Bagé. The derby between the clubs is called Ba-Gua.
