= Clube Esportivo Bento Gonçalves =

Association football club in Brazil

Esportivo
- Full name: Clube Esportivo Bento Gonçalves
- Nicknames: Tivo; Alviazul
- Founded: August 28, 1919 (106 years ago)
- Ground: Parque Esportivo Montanha dos Vinhedos
- Capacity: 15,000
- President: Laudir Piccoli
- Head coach: Luís Carlos Winck
- League: Campeonato Gaúcho Série A2
- 2025: Gaúcho Série A2, 12th of 15
- Website: www.clubeesportivo.com.br
Home colours	Away colours

Clube Esportivo Bento Gonçalves, commonly referred to as Esportivo, is a Brazilian football club based in Bento Gonçalves, Rio Grande do Sul. It currently plays in Campeonato Gaúcho Série A2, the second level of the Rio Grande do Sul state football league.

== History ==
On August 28, 1919, Clube Esportivo Bento Gonçalves was founded by Leonardo Carlucci and other sportsmen.

In 1969, the club won the Campeonato Gaúcho Second Level, beating by W.O. Avenida.

In 1979, Esportivo finished as Campeonato Gaúcho runner-up, ahead of Internacional.

In 1989, the club competed in the Brazilian Championship Second Level, but was eliminated in the first stage of the competition.

In 1999, the Esportivo de Bento Gonçalves won again the Campeonato Gaúcho Second Level, finishing ahead of 15 de Novembro, Glória and Rio Grande in the final stage, which was a group stage competed by four clubs.

In 2004, Esportivo won the Copa FGF, beating Gaúcho de Passo Fundo in the final round.

They won the Campeonato Gaúcho Second Level again in 2012.

== Honours ==
=== Official tournaments ===
State
Competitions	Titles	Seasons
Copa FGF	1	2004
Copa Governador do Estado	3	1973, 1977, 1980
Campeonato Gaúcho Série A2	4	1969, 1999, 2012, 2022

- record

=== Others tournaments ===
==== State ====
- Copa ACEG (1): 1983
- Campeonato do Interior Gaúcho (7): 1970, 1971, 1976, 1979, 1982, 1987, 2020

=== Runners-up ===
- Campeonato Gaúcho (1): 1979
- Copa Governador do Estado (2): 1976, 1978
- Campeonato Gaúcho Série A2 (2): 1981, 2019

== Stadium ==
Esportivo's stadium is Estádio Parque Esportivo Montanha dos Vinhedos, inaugurated in 2004, with a maximum capacity of 15,000 people.
