= Campeonato Gaúcho Série A2 =

Football tournament in Brazil

- Organising body: FGF
- Founded: 1952; 74 years ago
- Country: Brazil
- State: Rio Grande do Sul
- Level on pyramid: 2
- Promotion to: Campeonato Gaúcho
- Relegation to: Série B
- Domestic cup: Copa FGF
- Current champions: Novo Hamburgo (3rd title) (2025)
- Most championships: Ypiranga (5 titles)
- Website: FGF Official website

The Campeonato Gaúcho Série A2 (Gaucho Championship Series A2) is the second tier of the professional state football league in the Brazilian state of Rio Grande do Sul. It is run by the Rio Grande do Sul Football Federation (FGF).

== List of champions ==
=== Segunda Divisão de Profissionais ===
Season	Champions	Runners-up
1952	Sá Viana (1)	Santa Cruz
1953	Flamengo (1)	Ferro Carril
1954	Guarany (CA) (1)	Atlântico
1955	Guarany (CA) (2)	Lajeadense
1956	Glória de Carazinho (1)	Guarany (CA)
1957	Nacional (CA) (1)	Lajeadense
1958	Elite (1)	Atlântico
1959	Lajeadense (1)	Nacional (CA)
1960	Tamoyo (1)	Estrela

=== Torneio de Acesso ===
Season	Champions	Runners-up
1961	Brasil de Pelotas (1)	Atlântico
1962	Rio Grande (1)	Atlântico
1963	São José (PA) (1)	Rio-Grandense (RG)
1964	Bagé (1)	Avenida

=== Primeira Divisão ===
Season	Champions	Runners-up
1965	Rio-Grandense (RG) (1)	Gaúcho
1966	Gaúcho (1)	Uruguaiana

=== Divisão de Ascenso ===
Season	Champions	Runners-up
1967	Ypiranga (1)	N/A
1967	São Paulo (1)	N/A
1968	Inter de Santa Maria (1)	N/A
1968	14 de Julho (PF) (1)	N/A
1969	Guarany de Bagé (1)	N/A
1969	Esportivo (1)	N/A

=== Primeira Divisão ===
Season	Champions	Runners-up
1970	São Paulo (2)	Tamoyo

=== Segunda Divisão ===
Season	Champions	Runners-up
1975	São Luiz (1)	Armour
1976	Not held	
1977	Gaúcho (2)	Estrela
1978	Riograndense (SM) (1)	Cachoeira
1979	Lajeadense (2)	14 de Julho (SL)
1980	Armour (1)	São Gabriel
1981	São José (PA) (2)	Esportivo
1982	Bagé (2)	Aimoré
1983	Pelotas (1)	Santa Cruz
1984	Gaúcho (3)	Rio-Grandense
1985	Bagé (3)	São Paulo
1986	Passo Fundo (1)	Lajeadense
1987	Guarany (CA) (3)	Aimoré
1988	Glória de Vacaria (1)	Guarany de Bagé
1989	Ypiranga (2)	Guarany (CA)
1990	São Luiz (2)	Guarani (VA)
1991	Inter de Santa Maria (2)	Grêmio Santanense
1992	Brasil de Farroupilha (1)	Guarany (GA)
1993	Veranópolis (1)	Bagé
1994	Atlético Carazinho (1)	15 de Novembro
1995	Santo Ângelo (1)	Palmeirense
1996	Novo Hamburgo (1)	São José (PA)
1997	São José (CS) (1)	Lajeadense
1998	Torrense (1)	Avenida

=== Divisão de Acesso ===
Season	Champions	Runners-up
1999	Esportivo (2)	15 de Novembro
2000	Novo Hamburgo (2)	Inter de Santa Maria
2001	Palmeirense (1)	São Gabriel
2002	São José (CS) (2)	Brasil de Pelotas

=== Segunda Divisão ===
Season	Champions	Runners-up
2003	Ulbra (1)	Novo Hamburgo
2004	Brasil de Pelotas (2)	Farroupilha
2005	São Luiz (3)	Gaúcho
2006	Guarany de Bagé (2)	Guarani (VA)
2007	Sapucaiense (1)	Inter de Santa Maria
2008	Ypiranga (3)	Avenida
2009	Porto Alegre (1)	Pelotas
2010	Cruzeiro (1)	Lajeadense
2011	Avenida (1)	Cerâmica

=== Divisão de Acesso ===
Season	Champions	Runners-up
2012	Esportivo (3)	Passo Fundo
2013	Brasil de Pelotas (3)	São Paulo
2014	Ypiranga (4)	Avenida
2015	Glória de Vacaria (2)	Guarani (VA)
2016	Caxias (2)	Pelotas
2017	São Luiz (4)	Avenida
2018	Pelotas (2)	Aimoré
2019	Ypiranga (5)	Esportivo
2020	Not finished due to the COVID-19 pandemic in Brazil	

=== Série A2 ===
Season	Champions	Runners-up
2021	União Frederiquense (1)	Guarany de Bagé
2022	Esportivo (4)	Avenida
2023	Santa Cruz (1)	Guarany de Bagé
2024	Monsoon (1)	Pelotas
2025	Novo Hamburgo (3)	Inter de Santa Maria

=== Notes ===
- Flamengo is the currently SER Caxias.
- Ulbra is the currently Canoas SC.
- In 2013, Cruzeiro has moved from Porto Alegre to Cachoeirinha.

== Titles by team ==
Teams in bold stills active.

Rank	Club	Winners	Winning years
1	**Ypiranga**	5	1967 (shared), 1989, 2008, 2014, 2019
2	**Esportivo**	4	1969 (shared), 1999, 2012, 2022
2	**São Luiz**	4	1975, 1990, 2005, 2017
4	**Bagé**	3	1964, 1982, 1985
4	**Brasil de Pelotas**	3	1961, 2004, 2013
4	**Gaúcho**	3	1966, 1977, 1984
4	Guarany (CA)	3	1954, 1955, 1987
4	**Novo Hamburgo**	3	1996, 2000, 2025
9	**Caxias**	2	1953, 2016
9	**Glória de Vacaria**	2	1988, 2015
9	**Guarany de Bagé**	2	1969 (shared), 2006
9	**Inter de Santa Maria**	2	1968 (shared), 1991
9	**Lajeadense**	2	1959, 1979
9	**Pelotas**	2	1983, 2018
9	São José (CS)	2	1997, 2002
9	**São José (PA)**	2	1963, 1981
9	**São Paulo**	2	1967 (shared), 1970
18	14 de Julho (PF)	1	1968 (shared)
18	Armour	1	1980
18	**Atlético Carazinho**	1	1994
18	**Avenida**	1	2011
18	**Brasil de Farroupilha**	1	1992
18	Canoas	1	2004
18	**Cruzeiro**	1	2010
18	**Elite**	1	1958
18	Glória de Carazinho	1	1956
18	**Monsoon**	1	2024
18	Nacional (CA)	1	1957
18	Palmeirense	1	2001
18	**Passo Fundo**	1	1986
18	Porto Alegre	1	2009
18	**Rio Grande**	1	1962
18	Riograndense (SM)	1	1978
18	**Rio-Grandense (RG)**	1	1965
18	Sá Viana	1	1952
18	**Santa Cruz**	1	2023
18	**Santo Ângelo**	1	1995
18	**Sapucaiense**	1	2007
18	Tamoyo	1	1960
18	Torrense	1	1998
18	**União Frederiquense**	1	2021
18	**Veranópolis**	1	1994

=== By city ===
City	Championships	Clubs
Bagé	5	Bagé (3), Guarany de Bagé (2)
Erechim	5	Ypiranga (5)
Passo Fundo	5	Gaúcho (3), 14 de Julho (PF) (1), Passo Fundo (1)
Pelotas	5	Brasil de Pelotas (3), Pelotas (2)
Porto Alegre	5	São José (PA) (2), Cruzeiro (1), Monsoon (1), Porto Alegre (1)
Bento Gonçalves	4	Esportivo (4)
Cruz Alta	4	Guarany (CA) (3), Nacional (CA) (1)
Ijuí	4	São Luiz (4)
Rio Grande	4	São Paulo (2), Rio Grande (1), Rio-Grandense (RG) (1)
Novo Hamburgo	3	Novo Hamburgo (3)
Santa Maria	3	Inter de Santa Maria (2), Riograndense (SM) (1)
Santo Ângelo	3	Elite (1), Santo Ângelo (1), Tamoyo (1)
Cachoeira do Sul	2	São José (CS) (2)
Carazinho	2	Atlético Carazinho (1), Glória de Carazinho (1)
Caxias do Sul	2	Caxias (2)
Lajeado	2	Lajeadense (2)
Santa Cruz do Sul	2	Avenida (1), Santa Cruz (1)
Vacaria	2	Glória de Vacaria (2)
Canoas	1	Canoas (1)
Farroupilha	1	Brasil de Farroupilha (1)
Frederico Westphalen	1	União Frederiquense (1)
Palmeira das Missões	1	Palmeirense (1)
Santana do Livramento	1	Armour (1)
Sapucaia do Sul	1	Sapucaiense (1)
Torres	1	Torrense (1)
Uruguaiana	1	Sá Viana (1)
Veranópolis	1	Veranópolis (1)

== See also ==
- Campeonato Gaúcho
- Campeonato Gaúcho Série B
