= Clube Esportivo Lajeadense =

Lajeadense
- Full name: Clube Esportivo Lajeadense
- Nickname: Alviazul
- Founded: April 23, 1911 (115 years ago)
- Ground: Arena Alviazul
- Capacity: 8,000
- President: Marcos André Mallmann
- League: Campeonato Gaúcho Série A2
- Website: www.celajeadense.com.br
Home colors	Away colors

Clube Esportivo Lajeadense, commonly referred to as Lajeadense, is a Brazilian football club based in Lajeado, Rio Grande do Sul. It currently plays in Campeonato Gaúcho Série A2, the second level of the Rio Grande do Sul state football league.

== History ==
The club was founded on April 4, 1911. They won the Campeonato Gaúcho Second Division in 1959 and in 1979 and many titles in 2010s decade.

== Honours ==
- Campeonato Gaúcho Série A2
  - Winners (2): 1959, 1979
- Campeonato Gaúcho Série B
  - Winners (1): 1978
- Copa FGF
  - Winners (2): 2014, 2015
- Recopa Gaúcha
  - Winners (1): 2015
- Copa Sul-Fronteira
  - Winners (1): 2014
- Super Copa Gaúcha
  - Winners (1): 2014

== Stadium ==
Clube Esportivo Lajeadense play their home games at Arena Alviazul. The stadium has a maximum capacity of 7,500 people.
