= Grêmio Esportivo Bagé =

Bagé
- Full name: Grêmio Esportivo Bagé
- Nickname(s): Jalde-negro (Black Jalde)
- Founded: August 5, 1920
- Ground: Pedra Moura
- Capacity: 10,000
- Chairman: Carlos Alberto Ducos
- League: Campeonato Gaúcho Série A2
Home colours	Away colours

Grêmio Esportivo Bagé, commonly referred to as Bagé, is a Brazilian football club based in Bagé, Rio Grande do Sul. It currently plays in Campeonato Gaúcho Série A2, the second level of the Rio Grande do Sul state football league.

== History ==
Grêmio Esportivo Bagé was founded on August 5, 1920. The club results of the union of two other local teams, the 14 de Julho and Rio Branco.

In relation to the colors, it inherits of Rio Branco the yellow and of the July 14 the black, becoming the traditional gold-black.

=== Founders ===
(in alphabetical order)

•Dr. Átila Vinhas •Dr. Carlos Brasil •Florêncio Py Lima •José Maria Parera •Leonardo Teixeira •Leonidio Malafaia •Nélson Osório Ripalda •Paulino Brandi •Dr. Sílvio Vinhas •Dr. Valandro •Virato Azambuja

=== The First Management ===
President: Alípio Pereira Costa

Treasurer: Sargento Osório

Secretary:Austeclino Guaspe

Captain: Rafael Médice

== Honours ==
=== State ===
- Campeonato Gaúcho
  - Winners (1): 1925
  - Runners-up (5): 1927, 1928, 1940, 1944, 1957
- Copa Governador do Estado
  - Winners (1): 1974
- Campeonato Gaúcho Série A2
  - Winners (3): 1964, 1982, 1985
- Campeonato Gaúcho Série B
  - Runners-up (2): 2017, 2022
- Campeonato do Interior Gaúcho
  - Winners (6): 1925, 1927, 1928, 1940, 1944, 1957
- Copa Cícero Soares
  - Winners (1): 1977

=== City ===
- Campeonato Citadino de Bagé
  - Winners (23): 1922, 1924, 1925, 1927, 1928, 1931, 1932, 1933, 1936, 1939, 1940, 1942, 1944, 1949, 1951, 1952, 1953, 1954, 1955, 1957, 1971, 1975, 1976
- Copa Centenário de Bagé
  - Winners (1): 1959
- Taça Cidade de Bagé
  - Winners (1): 1976

== Rio Grande do Sul First Division Records ==
Year	Position	Year	Position	Year	Position	Year	Position
1922	4th	1940	2nd	1971	9th	1979	15th
1925	1st	1942	4th	1973	8th	1980	14th
1926	*	1944	2nd	1975	8th	1983	11th
1927	2nd	1949	5th	1976	12th	1984	14th
1928	2nd	1953	5th	1977	9th	1986	14th
1929	*	1957	2nd	1978	10th	1994	20th

- Currently Bagé participates in the Second Division of the Rio Grande do Sul (since 1995).

== Stadium ==
- Name: Pedra Moura
- Capacity: 10,000

It was inaugurated in the beginning of the twenties.

== The mascot ==
The mascot is a bee. Chosen by the colors, but also by the work in group and ferocious attacks.

== Rival ==
Bagé's greatest rival is Guarany. The derby between the clubs is called 'Ba-Gua', and it is played there is more than 85 years.
