= Clube Esportivo Aimoré =

Brazilian association football club

Aimoré
- Full name: Clube Esportivo Aimoré
- Nickname: Índio Capilé
- Founded: 26 March 1936; 89 years ago
- Ground: Estádio Cristo Rei
- Capacity: 12,000
- President: André Luiz Schu
- Head coach: PC Oliveira
- League: Campeonato Gaúcho Série A2
- 2025: Gaúcho Série A2, 3rd of 15
- Website: http://www.ceaimore.com.br/
Home colors	Away colors

Clube Esportivo Aimoré, commonly referred to as Aimoré, is a Brazilian football club based in São Leopoldo, Rio Grande do Sul. The club competes in the Série D, the fourth tier of the Brazilian football league system, as well as in the Campeonato Gaúcho Série A, the top division in the Rio Grande do Sul state football league system.

== History ==
The club was founded on March 26, 1936. Aimoré closed its football department in 1996, reopening it ten years later, in 2006. They won the Campeonato Gaúcho Third Level in 2012.

== Honours ==
- Copa FGF
  - Runners-up (2): 2017, 2025
- Campeonato Gaúcho Série A2
  - Runners-up (3): 1982, 1987, 2018
- Campeonato Gaúcho Série B
  - Winners (1): 2012
- Torneio Início do Campeonato Gaúcho
  - Winners (1): 1964

=== City ===
- Campeonato Citadino de São Leopoldo
  - Winners (5): 1942, 1943, 1945, 1950, 1951
- Torneio Início de Porto Alegre
  - Winners (1): 1964

== Stadium ==
Clube Esportivo Aimoré play their home games at Estádio João Corrêa da Silveira, in São Leopoldo, nicknamed Estádio Cristo Rei. The stadium has a maximum capacity of 12,000 people.

== Current squad ==
Note: Flags indicate national team as defined under FIFA eligibility rules; some limited exceptions apply. Players may hold more than one non-FIFA nationality.

No.	Pos.	Nation	Player
—	GK	BRA	Alencar
—	GK	BRA	Axel Costa
—	GK	BRA	Rafael
—	DF	BRA	Alex Herber
—	DF	BRA	Alex Scalsky
—	DF	BRA	Douglas Mã
—	DF	BRA	Fábio Rodighero
—	DF	BRA	Jésum
—	DF	BRA	João Pedro
—	DF	BRA	Luanderson
—	DF	BRA	Luis Henrique
—	DF	BRA	Naydion

No.	Pos.	Nation	Player
—	DF	BRA	Rogério
—	DF	BRA	Vinicius
—	MF	BRA	Ângelo (on loan from Grêmio)
—	MF	BRA	Evandro
—	MF	BRA	Everton Faísca
—	MF	BRA	Jean Paulo
—	MF	BRA	João Paulo
—	MF	BRA	Marcos César
—	MF	BRA	Mikael
—	MF	BRA	Tailson Roberto
—	MF	BRA	Yan Fornazier
