= Esporte Clube Internacional =

Brazilian football club

Inter de Santa Maria
- Full name: Esporte Clube Internacional
- Nicknames: Coloradinho; Interzinho; Alvi-Rubro
- Founded: May 16, 1928; 97 years ago
- Ground: Estádio Presidente Vargas
- Capacity: 12,000
- Website: intersm.com.br
Home colors	Away colors	Third colors

Esporte Clube Internacional, usually known as Inter de Santa Maria, Internacional de Santa Maria, Inter-SM, is a Brazilian football club based in Santa Maria, Rio Grande do Sul. It currently plays in Campeonato Gaúcho, the first tier of the Rio Grande do Sul state of football league.

== History ==
Founded on May 16, 1928. The club competed in the Campeonato Brasileiro Série A in 1982, finishing 21st. Inter plays its home matches in its own stadium, Estádio Presidente Vargas, which has a maximum capacity of 12,000 people and is also known as Baixada Melancólica.

== Honours ==
=== Official tournaments ===
State
Competitions	Titles	Seasons
Copa Governador do Estado	2	1979, 1987
Campeonato Gaúcho Série A2	2	1968, 1991

=== Others tournaments ===
==== State ====
- Campeonato do Interior Gaúcho (1): 1981

==== City ====
- Campeonato Citadino de Santa Maria (15): 1942, 1944, 1945, 1946, 1949, 1950, 1951, 1962, 1965, 1966, 1967, 1968, 1969, 1970, 1974

=== Runners-up ===
- Campeonato Gaúcho Série A2 (3): 2000, 2007, 2025
