= 1960 Panamerican Championship squads =

These are the squads for the countries that played in the 1960 Panamerican Championship.

The age listed for each player is on 6 March 1960, the first day of the tournament. The numbers of caps and goals listed for each player do not include any matches played after the start of the tournament. The club listed is the club for which the player last played a competitive match before the tournament. The nationality for each club reflects the national association (not the league) to which the club is affiliated. A flag is included for coaches who are of a different nationality than their own national team.

== Argentina ==
Head Coach: Guillermo Stábile

No.	Pos.	Player	Date of birth (age)	Caps	Club
	GK	Osvaldo Ayala	5 August 1938 (aged 21)		(Argentina) Boca Juniors
	GK	Vladimiro Tarnawsky	19 August 1939 (aged 20)		(Argentina) Newell's Old Boys
	DF	Rubén Navarro (captain)	30 March 1933 (aged 26)		(Argentina) Independiente
	DF	Marcelo Echegaray	20 November 1936 (aged 23)		(Argentina) Atlanta
	DF	Silvio Marzolini	4 October 1940 (aged 19)		(Argentina) Boca Juniors
	DF	Óscar Claria	17 July 1933 (aged 26)		(Argentina) Atlanta
	MF	Juan Héctor Guidi	14 July 1930 (aged 29)		(Argentina) Lanús
	MF	Walter Antonio Jiménez	29 May 1939 (aged 20)		(Argentina) Independiente
	MF	Ramón Abeledo	29 April 1937 (aged 22)		(Argentina) Independiente
	MF	Carlos Alberto Álvarez	16 January 1934 (aged 26)		(Argentina) Rosario Central
	MF	Raúl Belén	1 July 1931 (aged 28)		(Argentina) Racing
	MF	José Varacka	27 May 1932 (aged 27)		(Argentina) Independiente
	MF	Ricardo Bosich	16 July 1932 (aged 27)		(Argentina) Vélez Sársfield
	MF	Héctor Pederzoli	15 January 1933 (aged 27)		(Argentina) River Plate
	FW	Osvaldo Nardiello	31 August 1936 (aged 23)		(Argentina) Boca Juniors
	FW	Juan Carlos Sarnari	22 January 1942 (aged 18)		(Argentina) River Plate
	FW	Ermindo Onega	30 April 1940 (aged 19)		(Argentina) River Plate
	FW	Pedro Callá	1 January 1934 (aged 26)		(Argentina) Argentinos Juniors
	FW	Edgardo D'Ascenzo	17 June 1937 (aged 22)		(Argentina) Nueva Chicago
	FW	Alberto Dacquarti	15 March 1935 (aged 24)		(Argentina) Nueva Chicago
	FW	Roberto Brookes	1938 (aged 21-22)		(Argentina) Chacarita Juniors

== Brazil ==
Head Coach: Oswaldo Rolla

No.	Pos.	Player	Date of birth (age)	Caps	Club
	GK	Irno Lubke	23 December 1934 (aged 25)		(Brazil) Santos
	GK	Suly	30 October 1938 (aged 21)		(Brazil) Grêmio
	DF	Orlando Rosa	28 February 1939 (aged 21)		(Brazil) Grêmio
	DF	Airton Pavilhão	31 October 1934 (aged 25)		(Brazil) Grêmio
	DF	Soligo	24 June 1931 (aged 28)		(Brazil) Aimoré
	DF	Calvet	3 November 1934 (aged 25)		(Brazil) Grêmio
	DF	Ortunho	1 October 1935 (aged 24)		(Brazil) Grêmio
	MF	Ênio Rodrigues	11 January 1927 (aged 33)		(Brazil) Grêmio
	MF	Mengálvio	17 December 1939 (aged 20)		(Brazil) Aimoré
	MF	Milton Kuelle	22 August 1933 (aged 26)		(Brazil) Grêmio
	MF	Alfeu	24 August 1936 (aged 23)		(Brazil) Internacional
	MF	Élton Fensterseifer	30 September 1937 (aged 22)		(Brazil) Grêmio
	MF	Gessy Lima	24 September 1935 (aged 24)		(Brazil) Grêmio
	MF	Kim	31 January 1933 (aged 27)		(Brazil) Internacional
	FW	Juarez Teixeira	20 September 1928 (aged 31)		(Brazil) Grêmio
	FW	Bruno Comozzato	3 July 1936 (aged 23)		(Brazil) Internacional
	FW	Gilberto Andrade	9 November 1937 (aged 22)		(Brazil) Aimoré
	FW	Ivo Diogo	12 January 1935 (aged 25)		(Brazil) Internacional
	FW	Jurandir	20 May 1937 (aged 22)		(Brazil) Grêmio
	FW	Marino	21 March 1939 (aged 20)		(Brazil) Aimoré

== Costa Rica ==
Head coach: (Uruguay) Rubén Amorín

No.	Pos.	Player	Date of birth (age)	Caps	Club
	GK	Hernán Alvarado Guerrero	25 November 1932 (aged 27)		(Costa Rica) Herediano
	GK	Carlos Alvarado Villalobos	11 December 1927 (aged 32)		(Costa Rica) Alajuelense
	GK	Felipe Induni	16 August 1940 (aged 19)		(Costa Rica) Saprissa
	DF	Álvaro Chaves	11 January 1941 (aged 19)		(Costa Rica) Herediano
	DF	Álvaro Grant	3 February 1938 (aged 22)		(Costa Rica) Herediano
	DF	Alex Sánchez	20 July 1930 (aged 29)		(Costa Rica) Saprissa
	DF	Giovanni Rodríguez Chavarría	8 January 1936 (aged 24)		(Costa Rica) Saprissa
	DF	José Luis Quesada	1 December 1926 (aged 33)		(Costa Rica) Alajuelense
	DF	José Manuel Villalobos	23 February 1939 (aged 21)		(Costa Rica) Herediano
	MF	Marvin Rodríguez	26 November 1934 (aged 25)		(Costa Rica) Saprissa
	MF	Tulio Quirós	7 August 1930 (aged 29)		(Costa Rica) Saprissa
	MF	Edgar Quesada	16 August 1931 (aged 28)		(Costa Rica) Herediano
	MF	Juan José Gámez	8 July 1939 (aged 20)		(Costa Rica) Alajuelense
	MF	Miguel Cortés	30 July 1939 (aged 20)		(Costa Rica) Saprissa
	FW	Alberto Armijo	27 September 1926 (aged 33)		(Costa Rica) Cartaginés
	FW	Juan Ulloa	5 February 1935 (aged 25)		(Costa Rica) Alajuelense
	FW	Jorge Monge	14 February 1938 (aged 22)		(Costa Rica) Saprissa
	FW	Rubén Jiménez	9 December 1932 (aged 27)		(Costa Rica) Saprissa
	FW	Óscar Bejarano	15 September 1932 (aged 27)		(Costa Rica) Herediano
	FW	Álvaro Murillo	24 November 1930 (aged 29)		(Costa Rica) Saprissa
	FW	Guillermo Padilla			(Costa Rica) Uruguay de Coronado
	FW	Guillermo Valenciano	18 October 1939 (aged 20)		(Costa Rica) Saprissa
	FW	Rigoberto Rojas	27 March 1938 (aged 21)		(Costa Rica) Saprissa

== Mexico ==
Head coach: Ignacio Trelles

No.	Pos.	Player	Date of birth (age)	Caps	Club
	GK	Jaime Gómez	29 December 1929 (aged 30)		(Mexico) Guadalajara
	GK	Antonio Carbajal	7 June 1929 (aged 30)		(Mexico) León
	GK	Fernando Barrón	12 October 1933 (aged 26)		(Mexico) Toluca
	DF	Juan Martínez Bosco	2 September 1935 (aged 24)		(Mexico) América
	DF	Jesús del Muro	30 November 1937 (aged 22)		(Mexico) Atlas
	DF	Ignacio Jáuregui	31 July 1938 (aged 21)		(Mexico) Atlas
	DF	Juan Manuel Lemus	24 June 1934 (aged 25)		(Mexico) América
	DF	Jorge Romo	20 April 1923 (aged 36)		(Mexico) Toluca
	MF	Alfonso Portugal	21 January 1934 (aged 26)		(Mexico) América
	MF	Pedro Nájera	3 February 1929 (aged 31)		(Mexico) América
	MF	Sabás Ponce	13 January 1938 (aged 22)		(Mexico) Guadalajara
	MF	Héctor Hernández	6 December 1935 (aged 24)		(Mexico) Guadalajara
	MF	Antonio Vázquez Esperanza	16 June 1934 (aged 25)		(Mexico) Atlante
	MF	Tomás Reynoso	12 December 1935 (aged 24)		(Mexico) Necaxa
	FW	Alfredo del Águila	3 January 1935 (aged 25)		(Mexico) Toluca
	FW	Salvador Reyes Monteón	20 September 1936 (aged 23)		(Mexico) Guadalajara
	FW	Raúl Cárdenas	30 October 1928 (aged 31)		(Mexico) Zacatepec
	FW	Antonio Jasso	11 March 1935 (aged 24)		(Mexico) Zacatepec
	FW	Ramón Sigifredo Mercado	31 August 1933 (aged 26)		(Mexico) Toluca
	FW	Carlos González	12 April 1935 (aged 24)		(Mexico) Atlas
	FW	Isidoro Díaz	14 February 1938 (aged 22)		(Mexico) Guadalajara
	FW	Florentino Quintanar	21 August 1934 (aged 25)		(Mexico) Zacatepec
	FW	Teodoro Castañón	16 April 1936 (aged 23)		(Mexico) Toluca
