= Argentina national football team results (1960–1979) =

National football team results (1960–1979)

This page details the match results and statistics of the Argentina national football team from 1960 to 1979.

== Key ==
Key to matches

- Att.=Match attendance
- (H)=Home ground
- (A)=Away ground
- (N)=Neutral ground

Key to record by opponent

- Pld=Games played
- W=Games won
- D=Games drawn
- L=Games lost
- GF=Goals for
- GA=Goals against

== Results ==
Argentina's score is shown first in each case.

No.	Date	Venue	Opponents	Score	Competition	Argentina scorers	Att.	Ref.
317	8 March 1960	Estadio Nacional, San José (N)	Costa Rica	0–0	1960 Panamerican Championship		—	
318	10 March 1960	Estadio Nacional, San José (N)	Mexico	3–2	1960 Panamerican Championship	Belén (2), Nardiello	20,000	
319	13 March 1960	Estadio Nacional, San José (N)	Brazil	2–1	1960 Panamerican Championship	Belén, Nardiello	—	
320	15 March 1960	Estadio Nacional, San José (N)	Costa Rica	2–0	1960 Panamerican Championship	Onega, D'Ascenzo	—	
321	17 March 1960	Estadio Nacional, San José (N)	Mexico	2–0	1960 Panamerican Championship	Jiménez, D'Ascenzo	30,000	
322	20 March 1960	Estadio Nacional, San José (N)	Brazil	0–1	1960 Panamerican Championship		—	
323	26 May 1960	Estadio Monumental, Buenos Aires (H)	Brazil	4–2	Copa Julio Argentino Roca	D'Ascenzo, Nardiello (2), Belén	—	
324	29 May 1960	Estadio Monumental, Buenos Aires (H)	Brazil	1–4 (a.e.t.)	Copa Julio Argentino Roca	Sosa	63,500	
325	9 July 1960	Estadio Monumental, Buenos Aires (H)	Paraguay	1–0	1960 Taça do Atlântico	Sosa	—	
326	12 July 1960	Maracanã Stadium, Rio de Janeiro (A)	Brazil	1–5	1960 Taça do Atlântico	Sosa	—	
327	24 July 1960	Estadio Monumental, Buenos Aires (H)	Spain	2–0	Friendly	Sanfilippo (2)	—	
328	17 August 1960	Estadio Monumental, Buenos Aires (H)	Uruguay	4–0	1960 Taça do Atlântico	Sanfilippo (3), Jiménez	—	
329	4 December 1960	Estadio Modelo, Guayaquil (A)	Ecuador	6–3	1962 FIFA World Cup qualification	Corbatta (2), Pando, Sosa, Sanfilippo, Ramaciotti	60,000	
330	17 December 1960	Boca Juniors Stadium, Buenos Aires (H)	Ecuador	5–0	1962 FIFA World Cup qualification	Corbatta (2), Sanfilippo, Sosa, Pando	50,000	
331	17 May 1961	Asunción (A)	Paraguay	0–0	Friendly		—	
332	4 June 1961	Estádio Nacional, Lisbon (A)	Portugal	2–0	Friendly	Sanfilippo, Pando	—	
333	11 June 1961	Ramón Sánchez Pizjuán Stadium, Seville (A)	Spain	0–2	Friendly		—	
334	15 June 1961	Stadio Artemio Franchi, Florence (A)	Italy	1–4	Friendly	Sacchi	36,500	
335	19 June 1961	Stadion Za Lužánkami, Brno (A)	Czechoslovakia	3–3	Friendly	Sanfilippo (2), Artime	40,000	
336	24 June 1961	Central Lenin Stadium, Moscow (A)	Soviet Union	0–0	Friendly		102,000	
337	12 October 1961	Estadio de Independiente, Avellaneda (H)	Paraguay	5–1	Friendly	Corbatta (2), Pagani, Sanfilippo, Artime	—	
338	18 November 1961	Estadio Monumental, Buenos Aires (H)	Soviet Union	1–2	Friendly	Belén	110,000	
339	13 March 1962	Estadio Centenario, Montevideo (A)	Uruguay	1–1	Friendly	Sosa	—	
340	28 March 1962	Estadio Monumental, Buenos Aires (H)	Mexico	1–0	Friendly	Chaires (o.g.)	40,000	
341	30 May 1962	Estadio El Teniente, Rancagua (N)	Bulgaria	1–0	1962 FIFA World Cup	Facundo	7,134	
342	2 June 1962	Estadio El Teniente, Rancagua (N)	England	1–3	1962 FIFA World Cup	Sanfilippo	9,794	
343	6 June 1962	Estadio El Teniente, Rancagua (N)	Hungary	0–0	1962 FIFA World Cup		7,945	
344	15 August 1962	Estadio Monumental, Buenos Aires (H)	Uruguay	3–1	Copa Lipton	Pagani, Willington, González	—	
345	7 November 1962	Estadio Nacional, Santiago (A)	Chile	1–1	Copa Carlos Dittborn	Artime	—	
346	21 November 1962	Estadio Monumental, Buenos Aires (H)	Chile	1–0	Copa Carlos Dittborn	Artime	—	
347	10 March 1963	Estadio Félix Capriles, Cochabamba (N)	Colombia	4–2	1963 South American Championship	Zárate (2), J. H. Fernández, Rodríguez	18,000	
348	13 March 1963	Estadio Félix Capriles, Cochabamba (N)	Peru	1–2	1963 South American Championship	Zárate	10,000	
349	20 March 1963	Estadio Félix Capriles, Cochabamba (N)	Ecuador	4–2	1963 South American Championship	Savoy (3), Rodríguez	20,000	
350	24 March 1963	Estadio Hernando Siles, La Paz (N)	Brazil	3–0	1963 South American Championship	Rodríguez, Savoy, Juárez	30,000	
351	28 March 1963	Estadio Hernando Siles, La Paz (N)	Bolivia	2–3	1963 South American Championship	Rodríguez (2)	20,000	
352	31 March 1963	Estadio Hernando Siles, La Paz (N)	Paraguay	1–1	1963 South American Championship	Lallana	15,000	
353	13 April 1963	Estádio do Morumbi, São Paulo (A)	Brazil	3–2	Copa Julio Argentino Roca	Lallana (2), Juárez	—	
354	16 April 1963	Maracanã Stadium, Rio de Janeiro (A)	Brazil	2–5 (a.e.t.)	Copa Julio Argentino Roca	Savoy, E. Fernández	—	
355	15 October 1963	Estadio Defensores del Chaco, Asunción (A)	Paraguay	4–0	Copa Rosa Chevallier Boutell	Artime (2), Savoy, Onega	—	
356	29 October 1963	Estadio Monumental, Buenos Aires (H)	Paraguay	2–3	Copa Rosa Chevallier Boutell	Menotti, Artime	—	
357	31 May 1964	Maracanã Stadium, Rio de Janeiro (N)	Portugal	2–0	Taça das Nações	A. H. Rojas, Rendo	40,000	
358	3 June 1964	Pacaembu Stadium, São Paulo (N)	Brazil	3–0	Taça das Nações	Onega, Telch (2)	60,000	
359	6 June 1964	Maracanã Stadium, Rio de Janeiro (N)	England	1–0	Taça das Nações	A. H. Rojas	15,000	
360	24 September 1964	Estadio Monumental, Buenos Aires (H)	Chile	5–0	Copa Carlos Dittborn	Artime (2), Onega, Rendo, Bielli	—	
361	14 October 1964	Estadio Nacional, Santiago (A)	Chile	1–1	Copa Carlos Dittborn	Rattín	—	
362	25 November 1964	Estadio Defensores del Chaco, Asunción (A)	Paraguay	0–3	Copa Rosa Chevallier Boutell		—	
363	8 December 1964	Estadio Monumental, Buenos Aires (H)	Paraguay	8–1	Copa Rosa Chevallier Boutell	Onega (2), Prospitti (2), Artime (4)	—	
364	3 June 1965	Parc des Princes, Paris (A)	France	0–0	Friendly		11,931	
365	9 June 1965	Maracanã Stadium, Rio de Janeiro (A)	Brazil	0–0	Friendly		—	
366	14 July 1965	Estadio Monumental, Buenos Aires (H)	Chile	1–0	Copa Carlos Dittborn	Á. C. Rojas	—	
367	21 July 1965	Estadio Nacional, Santiago (A)	Chile	1–1	Copa Carlos Dittborn	Más	—	
368	1 August 1965	Estadio Monumental, Buenos Aires (H)	Paraguay	3–0	1966 FIFA World Cup qualification	Onega, Artime, González (o.g.)	63,817	
369	8 August 1965	Estadio Defensores del Chaco, Asunción (A)	Paraguay	0–0	1966 FIFA World Cup qualification		20,763	
370	17 August 1965	Estadio Monumental, Buenos Aires (H)	Bolivia	4–1	1966 FIFA World Cup qualification	Bernao (2), Onega (2)	56,173	
371	29 August 1965	Estadio Hernando Siles, La Paz (A)	Bolivia	2–1	1966 FIFA World Cup qualification	Artime (2)	9,690	
372	1 December 1965	Estadio Monumental, Buenos Aires (H)	Soviet Union	1–1	Friendly	Onega	60,000	
373	11 June 1966	Estadio Monumental, Buenos Aires (H)	Poland	1–1	Friendly	Más	50,000	
374	22 June 1966	Stadio Comunale, Turin (A)	Italy	0–3	Friendly		65,000	
375	13 July 1966	Villa Park, Birmingham (N)	Spain	2–1	1966 FIFA World Cup	Artime (2)	42,738	
376	16 July 1966	Villa Park, Birmingham (N)	West Germany	0–0	1966 FIFA World Cup		46,587	
377	19 July 1966	Hillsborough Stadium, Sheffield (N)	Switzerland	2–0	1966 FIFA World Cup	Artime, Onega	32,127	
378	23 July 1966	Wembley Stadium, London (N)	England	0–1	1966 FIFA World Cup		90,584	
379	18 January 1967	Estadio Centenario, Montevideo (N)	Paraguay	4–1	1967 South American Championship	Más, Bernao, Artime, Albrecht	12,000	
380	22 January 1967	Estadio Centenario, Montevideo (N)	Bolivia	1–0	1967 South American Championship	Bernao	6,000	
381	25 January 1967	Estadio Centenario, Montevideo (N)	Venezuela	5–1	1967 South American Championship	Artime (3), Carone, Marzolini	2,500	
382	28 January 1967	Estadio Centenario, Montevideo (N)	Chile	2–0	1967 South American Championship	Sarnari, Artime	14,000	
383	2 February 1967	Estadio Centenario, Montevideo (N)	Uruguay	0–1	1967 South American Championship		65,000	
384	15 August 1967	Santiago (A)	Chile	0–1	Friendly		—	
385	22 August 1967	Estadio Azteca, Mexico City (A)	Mexico	1–2	Friendly	Gennoni	—	
386	13 October 1967	Asunción (A)	Paraguay	1–1	Friendly	Pardo	—	
387	8 November 1967	Estadio Nacional, Santiago (A)	Chile	1–3	Friendly	Unknown	—	
388	15 May 1968	Asunción (A)	Paraguay	0–2	Friendly		—	
389	5 June 1968	Estadio Monumental, Buenos Aires (H)	Uruguay	2–0	Copa Lipton	Avallay, Fischer	—	
390	20 June 1968	Estadio Centenario, Montevideo (A)	Uruguay	1–2	Copa Newton	Forlán (o.g.)	—	
391	29 August 1968	Estadio Nacional, Lima (A)	Peru	2–2	Friendly	Yazalde, Savoy	—	
392	1 September 1968	Estadio Nacional, Lima (A)	Peru	1–1	Friendly	Veglio	—	
393	27 November 1968	Estadio Lisandro de la Torre, Rosario (H)	Chile	4–0	Copa Carlos Dittborn	Veglio, Fischer (2), Menotti	—	
394	4 December 1968	Estadio Nacional, Santiago (A)	Chile	1–2	Copa Carlos Dittborn	Rendo	—	
395	17 December 1968	Mar del Plata (H)	Poland	1–0	Friendly	Savoy	18,999	
396	22 December 1968	Mar del Plata (H)	Yugoslavia	1–1	Friendly	Olmedo	50,000	
397	19 March 1969	Rosario (H)	Paraguay	1–1	Friendly	Cocco	—	
398	9 April 1969	Asunción (A)	Paraguay	0–0	Friendly		—	
399	28 May 1969	Santiago (A)	Chile	1–1	Friendly	Quintano (o.g.)	—	
400	11 June 1969	La Plata (H)	Chile	2–1	Friendly	Fischer, Brindisi	—	
401	27 July 1969	Estadio Hernando Siles, La Paz (A)	Bolivia	1–3	1970 FIFA World Cup qualification	Tarabini	21,267	
402	3 August 1969	Estadio Nacional, Lima (A)	Peru	0–1	1970 FIFA World Cup qualification		43,147	
403	24 August 1969	Boca Juniors Stadium, Buenos Aires (H)	Bolivia	1–0	1970 FIFA World Cup qualification	Albrecht	47,069	
404	31 August 1969	Boca Juniors Stadium, Buenos Aires (H)	Peru	2–2	1970 FIFA World Cup qualification	Albrecht, Rendo	53,627	
405	4 March 1970	Estádio Beira-Rio, Porto Alegre (A)	Brazil	2–0	Friendly	Conigliaro, Más	100,000	
406	8 March 1970	Maracanã Stadium, Rio de Janeiro (A)	Brazil	1–2	Friendly	Brindisi	100,000	
407	8 April 1970	Boca Juniors Stadium, Buenos Aires (H)	Uruguay	2–1	Friendly	Conigliaro, Más	—	
408	15 April 1970	Estadio Centenario, Montevideo (A)	Uruguay	1–2	Friendly	Más	—	
409	22 October 1970	Asunción (A)	Paraguay	1–1	Friendly	Brindisi	—	
410	8 January 1971	Boca Juniors Stadium, Buenos Aires (H)	France	3–4	Friendly	Brindisi, Nicolau, Laraignée	4,500	
411	13 January 1971	Mar del Plata (H)	France	2–0	Friendly	Laraignée, Madurga	18,000	
412	4 July 1971	Estadio Defensores del Chaco, Asunción (A)	Paraguay	1–1	Copa Rosa Chevallier Boutell	Marcos	—	
413	9 July 1971	Estadio Lisandro de la Torre, Rosario (H)	Paraguay	1–0	Copa Rosa Chevallier Boutell	Laraignée	—	
414	14 July 1971	Boca Juniors Stadium, Buenos Aires (H)	Uruguay	1–0	Copa Lipton	Madurga	—	
415	18 July 1971	Estadio Centenario, Montevideo (A)	Uruguay	1–1	Copa Lipton	Bianchi	—	
416	21 July 1971	Estadio Nacional, Santiago (A)	Chile	2–2	Copa Carlos Dittborn	Bianchi (2)	—	
417	28 July 1971	Estadio Monumental, Buenos Aires (H)	Brazil	1–1	Copa Julio Argentino Roca	Madruga	—	
418	31 July 1971	Estadio Monumental, Buenos Aires (H)	Brazil	2–2 (a.e.t.)	Copa Julio Argentino Roca	Fischer (2)	—	
419	4 August 1971	Boca Juniors Stadium, Buenos Aires (H)	Chile	1–0	Copa Carlos Dittborn	Fischer	—	
420	25 May 1972	Salta (H)	Paraguay	0–0	Friendly		—	
421	31 May 1972	Estadio Nacional, Santiago (A)	Chile	4–3	Copa Carlos Dittborn	Más (2), Raimondo, Mastrángelo	—	
422	22 June 1972	Estádio Fonte Nova, Salvador (N)	Colombia	4–1	Brazil Independence Cup	Brindisi, Bianchi (2), Bargas	—	
423	25 June 1972	Estádio Fonte Nova, Salvador (N)	France	0–0	Brazil Independence Cup		6,587	
424	29 June 1972	Maracanã Stadium, Rio de Janeiro (N)	Portugal	1–3	Brazil Independence Cup	Brindisi	—	
425	2 July 1972	Mineirão, Belo Horizonte (N)	Soviet Union	1–0	Brazil Independence Cup	Pastoriza	8,000	
426	6 July 1972	Estádio Beira-Rio, Porto Alegre (N)	Uruguay	1–0	Brazil Independence Cup	Más	—	
427	9 July 1972	Maracanã Stadium, Rio de Janeiro (N)	Yugoslavia	2–4	Brazil Independence Cup	Brindisi (2)	170,000	
428	27 September 1972	José Amalfitani Stadium, Buenos Aires (H)	Chile	2–0	Copa Carlos Dittborn	Brindisi, Ayala	—	
429	11 October 1972	Santiago Bernabéu Stadium, Madrid (A)	Spain	0–1	Copa Hispanidad		—	
430	25 October 1972	Estadio Nacional, Lima (A)	Peru	2–0	Copa Ramón Castilla	Ayala (2)	—	
431	6 February 1973	Estadio Azteca, Mexico City (A)	Mexico	0–2	Friendly		20,000	
432	14 February 1973	Olympiastadion, Munich (A)	West Germany	3–2	Friendly	Brindisi, Alonso, Ghisso	—	
433	20 February 1973	Bloomfield Stadium, Tel Aviv (A)	Israel	1–1	Friendly	Heredia	16,000	
434	17 May 1973	José Amalfitani Stadium, Buenos Aires (H)	Uruguay	1–1	Copa Lipton	Brindisi	—	
435	23 May 1973	Estadio Centenario, Montevideo (A)	Uruguay	1–1	Copa Newton	Babington	—	
436	13 July 1973	Boca Juniors Stadium, Buenos Aires (H)	Chile	5–4	Copa Carlos Dittborn	Guerini, Ayala (2), Brindisi (2)	—	
437	18 July 1973	Estadio Nacional, Santiago (A)	Chile	1–3	Copa Carlos Dittborn	Brindisi	—	
438	27 July 1973	Boca Juniors Stadium, Buenos Aires (H)	Peru	3–1	Copa Ramón Castilla	Guerini (2), Brindisi	—	
439	9 September 1973	Boca Juniors Stadium, Buenos Aires (H)	Bolivia	4–0	1974 FIFA World Cup qualification	Brindisi (2), Ayala (2)	39,243	
440	16 September 1973	Estadio Defensores del Chaco, Asunción (A)	Paraguay	1–1	1974 FIFA World Cup qualification	Ayala	47,116	
441	23 September 1973	Estadio Hernando Siles, La Paz (A)	Bolivia	1–0	1974 FIFA World Cup qualification	Fornari	19,266	
442	7 October 1973	Boca Juniors Stadium, Buenos Aires (H)	Paraguay	3–1	1974 FIFA World Cup qualification	Ayala (2), Guerini	58,657	
443	22 April 1974	José Amalfitani Stadium, Buenos Aires (H)	Romania	2–1	Friendly	Houseman, Kempes	45,000	
444	18 May 1974	Parc des Princes, Paris (A)	France	1–0	Friendly	Kempes	26,735	
445	22 May 1974	Wembley Stadium, London (A)	England	2–2	Friendly	Kempes (2)	68,000	
446	25 May 1974	Olympic Stadium, Amsterdam (A)	Netherlands	1–4	Friendly	Ayala	20,000	
447	15 June 1974	Neckarstadion, Stuttgart (N)	Poland	2–3	1974 FIFA World Cup	Heredia, Babington	32,700	
448	19 June 1974	Neckarstadion, Stuttgart (N)	Italy	1–1	1974 FIFA World Cup	Houseman	70,100	
449	23 June 1974	Olympiastadion, Munich (N)	Haiti	4–1	1974 FIFA World Cup	Yazalde (2), Houseman, Ayala	25,900	
450	26 June 1974	Parkstadion, Gelsenkirchen (N)	Netherlands	0–4	1974 FIFA World Cup		56,548	
451	30 June 1974	Niedersachsenstadion, Hanover (N)	Brazil	1–2	1974 FIFA World Cup	Brindisi	39,400	
452	3 July 1974	Parkstadion, Gelsenkirchen (N)	East Germany	1–1	1974 FIFA World Cup	Houseman	54,254	
453	12 October 1974	Estadio Monumental, Buenos Aires (H)	Spain	1–1	Copa Hispanidad	Rogel	70,000	
454	6 November 1974	Estadio Nacional, Santiago (A)	Chile	2–0	Copa Carlos Dittborn	Ferrero, López	—	
455	20 November 1974	José Amalfitani Stadium, Buenos Aires (H)	Chile	1–1	Copa Carlos Dittborn	Galleti	—	
456	27 June 1975	Estadio Félix Capriles, Cochabamba (A)	Bolivia	2–1	Copa Cornelio Saavedra	Alderete, Asteciano	—	
457	18 July 1975	Estadio Centenario, Montevideo (A)	Uruguay	3–2	Copa Newton	Alonso, Valdano (2)	—	
458	3 August 1975	Estadio Olímpico, Caracas (A)	Venezuela	5–1	1975 Copa América	Luque (3), Kempes, Ardiles	15,000	
459	6 August 1975	Mineirão, Belo Horizonte (A)	Brazil	1–2	1975 Copa América	Asad	80,000	
460	10 August 1975	Estadio Gigante de Arroyito, Rosario (H)	Venezuela	11–0	1975 Copa América	D. Killer (3), Gallego, Ardiles, Kempes (2), Zanabria (2) Bóveda, Luque	50,000	
461	16 August 1975	Estadio Gigante de Arroyito, Rosario (H)	Brazil	0–1	1975 Copa América		50,000	
462	21 August 1975	Estadio Azteca, Mexico City (N)	United States	6–0	1975 Copa Ciudad de México	Coscia (2), Valencia, Ardiles (2), Cardenas	—	
463	28 August 1975	Estadio Azteca, Mexico City (N)	Costa Rica	2–0	1975 Copa Ciudad de México	Unknown	—	
464	31 August 1975	Estadio Azteca, Mexico City (N)	Mexico	1–1	1975 Copa Ciudad de México	Coscia	—	
465	25 February 1976	Estadio Defensores del Chaco, Asunción (A)	Paraguay	3–2	1976 Taça do Atlântico	Scotta (3)	—	
466	27 February 1976	Estadio Monumental, Buenos Aires (H)	Brazil	1–2	1976 Taça do Atlântico	Kempes	—	
467	20 March 1976	Central Stadium, Kyiv (A)	Soviet Union	1–0	Friendly	Kempes	45,000	
468	24 March 1976	Silesian Stadium, Chorzów (A)	Poland	2–1	Friendly	Scotta, Houseman	60,000	
469	27 March 1976	Népstadion, Budapest (A)	Hungary	0–2	Friendly		25,000	
470	8 April 1976	José Amalfitani Stadium, Buenos Aires (H)	Uruguay	4–1	1976 Taça do Atlântico	Kempes (2), Luque, Scotta	—	
471	28 April 1976	José Amalfitani Stadium, Buenos Aires (H)	Paraguay	2–2	1976 Taça do Atlântico	Kempes (2)	—	
472	19 May 1976	Maracanã Stadium, Rio de Janeiro (A)	Brazil	0–2	1976 Taça do Atlântico		—	
473	9 June 1976	Estadio Centenario, Montevideo (A)	Uruguay	3–0	1976 Taça do Atlântico	Luque, Kempes, Houseman	—	
474	13 October 1976	José Amalfitani Stadium, Buenos Aires (H)	Chile	2–0	Copa Carlos Dittborn	Ardiles, Bertoni	—	
475	28 October 1976	Estadio Nacional, Lima (A)	Peru	3–1	Copa Ramón Castilla	Houseman, Passarella, Quesada (o.g.)	—	
476	10 November 1976	José Amalfitani Stadium, Buenos Aires (H)	Peru	1–0	Copa Ramón Castilla	Passarella	—	
477	28 November 1976	Estadio Monumental, Buenos Aires (H)	Soviet Union	0–0	Friendly		—	
478	27 February 1977	Boca Juniors Stadium, Buenos Aires (H)	Hungary	5–1	Friendly	Luque (2), Bertoni (3)	70,000	
479	22 March 1977	Santiago Bernabéu Stadium, Madrid (N)	Iran	1–1 (4–1p)	Real Madrid 75th Anniversary Cup	Bertoni	35,000	
480	29 May 1977	Boca Juniors Stadium, Buenos Aires (H)	Poland	3–1	Friendly	Bertoni (2), Luque	57,000	
481	5 June 1977	Boca Juniors Stadium, Buenos Aires (H)	West Germany	1–3	Friendly	Passarella	60,000	
482	12 June 1977	Boca Juniors Stadium, Buenos Aires (H)	England	1–1	Friendly	Bertoni	60,000	
483	18 June 1977	Boca Juniors Stadium, Buenos Aires (H)	Scotland	1–1	Friendly	Passarella	57,000	
484	26 June 1977	Boca Juniors Stadium, Buenos Aires (H)	France	0–0	Friendly		40,000	
485	3 July 1977	Boca Juniors Stadium, Buenos Aires (H)	Yugoslavia	1–0	Friendly	Passarella	55,000	
486	12 July 1977	Boca Juniors Stadium, Buenos Aires (H)	East Germany	2–0	Friendly	Houseman, Carrascosa	50,000	
487	24 August 1977	Boca Juniors Stadium, Buenos Aires (H)	Paraguay	2–1	Copa Félix Bogado	Ortiz, Luque	—	
488	31 August 1977	Asunción (A)	Paraguay	0–2 (1–3p)	Copa Félix Bogado		—	
489	19 March 1978	Boca Juniors Stadium, Buenos Aires (H)	Peru	2–1	Copa Ramón Castilla	Houseman, Pagnanini	—	
490	23 March 1978	Lima (A)	Peru	3–1	Copa Ramón Castilla	Luque, Passarella, Houseman	—	
491	29 March 1978	Boca Juniors Stadium, Buenos Aires (H)	Bulgaria	3–1	Friendly	Gallego, Ortiz, Ardiles	60,000	
492	5 April 1978	Estadio Monumental, Buenos Aires (H)	Romania	2–0	Friendly	Passarella (2)	80,000	
493	19 April 1978	Buenos Aires (H)	(Republic of Ireland) League of Ireland XI	3–1	Friendly	Ortiz, Luque, Villa	50,000	
494	25 April 1978	Estadio Centenario, Montevideo (A)	Uruguay	0–2	Friendly		—	
495	3 May 1978	Boca Juniors Stadium, Buenos Aires (H)	Uruguay	3–0	Friendly	Luque, Ardiles, Alonso	—	
496	2 June 1978	Estadio Monumental, Buenos Aires (N)	Hungary	2–1	1978 FIFA World Cup	Luque, Bertoni	71,615	
497	6 June 1978	Estadio Monumental, Buenos Aires (N)	France	2–1	1978 FIFA World Cup	Passarella, Luque	71,666	
498	10 June 1978	Estadio Monumental, Buenos Aires (N)	Italy	0–1	1978 FIFA World Cup		71,712	
499	14 June 1978	Estadio Gigante de Arroyito, Rosario (N)	Poland	2–0	1978 FIFA World Cup	Kempes (2)	37,091	
500	18 June 1978	Estadio Gigante de Arroyito, Rosario (N)	Brazil	0–0	1978 FIFA World Cup		37,326	
501	21 June 1978	Estadio Gigante de Arroyito, Rosario (N)	Peru	6–0	1978 FIFA World Cup	Kempes (2), Tarantini, Luque (2), Houseman	37,315	
502	25 June 1978	Estadio Monumental, Buenos Aires (N)	Netherlands	3–1 (a.e.t.)	1978 FIFA World Cup	Kempes (2), Bertoni	71,483	
503	25 April 1979	Estadio Monumental, Buenos Aires (H)	Bulgaria	2–1	Friendly	Houseman, Passarella	80,000	
504	22 May 1979	Stadion Wankdorf, Bern (N)	Netherlands	0–0 (8–7p)	FIFA 75th Anniversary Cup		40,000	
505	26 May 1979	Stadio Olimpico, Rome (A)	Italy	2–2	Friendly	Valencia, Passarella	59,834	
506	29 May 1979	Lansdowne Road, Dublin (A)	Republic of Ireland	0–0	Friendly		25,000	
507	2 June 1979	Hampden Park, Glasgow (A)	Scotland	3–1	Friendly	Luque (2), Maradona	61,918	
508	18 July 1979	Estadio Hernando Siles, La Paz (A)	Bolivia	1–2	1979 Copa América	López	40,000	
509	2 August 1979	Maracanã Stadium, Rio de Janeiro (A)	Brazil	1–2	1979 Copa América	Coscia	130,000	
510	8 August 1979	José Amalfitani Stadium, Buenos Aires (H)	Bolivia	3–0	1979 Copa América	Passarella, Gáspari, Maradona	30,000	
511	23 August 1979	Estadio Monumental, Buenos Aires (H)	Brazil	2–2	1979 Copa América	Passarella, Ro. Díaz	68,000	
512	12 September 1979	Olympiastadion, West Berlin (A)	West Germany	1–2	Friendly	Castro	45,000	
513	16 September 1979	Red Star Stadium, Belgrade (A)	Yugoslavia	2–4	Friendly	Passarella, Ra. Díaz	20,000	

Notes

1. A: Uruguay were awarded the trophy as the visiting team.
2. B: Argentina were awarded the trophy as the visiting team.
3. C: Matches against Paraguay during the 1976 Taça do Atlântico doubled as the 1976 Copa Félix Bogado.
4. D: Matches against Brazil during the 1976 Taça do Atlântico doubled as the 1976 Copa Julio Argentino Roca.
5. E: The first match against Uruguay during the 1976 Taça do Atlântico doubled as the 1976 Copa Lipton.
6. F: The second match against Uruguay during the 1976 Taça do Atlântico doubled as the 1976 Copa Newton.
7. G: The match against League of Ireland XI in 1978 is considered official by FIFA.

== Record by opponent ==
Team	Pld	W	D	L	GF	GA	GD	WPCT
Bolivia	11	8	0	3	22	11	+11	72.73
Brazil	24	6	5	13	34	45	−11	25.00
Bulgaria	3	3	0	0	6	2	+4	100.00
Chile	22	12	6	4	41	24	+17	54.55
Colombia	2	2	0	0	8	3	+5	100.00
Costa Rica	3	2	1	0	4	0	+4	66.67
Czechoslovakia	1	0	1	0	3	3	0	0.00
East Germany	2	1	1	0	3	1	+2	50.00
Ecuador	3	3	0	0	15	5	+10	100.00
England	5	1	2	2	5	7	−2	20.00
France	7	3	3	1	8	5	+3	42.86
Haiti	1	1	0	0	4	1	+3	100.00
Hungary	4	2	1	1	7	4	+3	50.00
Iran	1	0	1	0	1	1	0	0.00
Israel	1	0	1	0	1	1	0	0.00
Italy	5	0	2	3	4	11	−7	0.00
(Republic of Ireland) League of Ireland XI	1	1	0	0	3	1	+2	100.00
Mexico	6	3	1	2	8	7	+1	50.00
Netherlands	4	1	1	2	4	9	−5	25.00
Paraguay	25	10	11	4	44	25	+19	40.00
Peru	12	7	3	2	26	12	+14	58.33
Portugal	3	2	0	1	5	3	+2	66.67
Poland	6	4	1	1	11	6	+5	66.67
Republic of Ireland	1	0	1	0	0	0	0	0.00
Romania	2	2	0	0	4	1	+3	100.00
Scotland	2	1	1	0	4	2	+2	50.00
Soviet Union	6	2	3	1	4	3	+1	33.33
Spain	5	2	1	2	5	5	0	40.00
Switzerland	1	1	0	0	2	0	+2	100.00
United States	1	1	0	0	6	0	+6	100.00
Uruguay	18	10	4	4	32	16	+16	55.56
Venezuela	3	3	0	0	21	2	+19	100.00
West Germany	4	1	1	2	5	7	−2	25.00
Yugoslavia	4	1	1	2	6	9	−3	25.00
Total	199	96	53	50	356	232	+124	48.24

Source: Results
