= 1960 in Brazilian football =

Football in Brazil
- Season: 1960

The following article presents a summary of the 1960 football (soccer) season in Brazil, which was the 59th season of competitive football in the country.

== Taça Brasil ==
Semifinals

Team 1	Agg.	Team 2	1st leg	2nd leg
Palmeiras	1-0	Fluminense	0-0	1-0
Santa Cruz	3-4	Fortaleza	2-2	1-2

Final

December 22, 1960

Fortaleza	1–3	Palmeiras

December 28, 1960

Palmeiras	8–2	Fortaleza

Palmeiras declared as the Taça Brasil champions by aggregate score of 11–3.

== Torneio Rio-São Paulo ==
Final Standings

Position	Team	Points	Played	Won	Drawn	Lost	For	Against	Difference
1	Fluminense	14	9	6	2	1	22	12	10
2	Botafogo	12	9	4	4	1	17	12	5
3	Vasco da Gama	11	9	4	3	2	17	11	6
4	Corinthians	11	9	4	3	2	11	10	1
5	Flamengo	11	9	5	1	3	13	14	-1
6	Palmeiras	9	9	4	1	4	12	11	1
7	São Paulo	7	9	2	3	4	11	19	-8
8	Santos	6	9	1	4	4	11	17	-6
9	Portuguesa	5	9	2	1	6	11	16	-5
10	América	5	9	1	2	6	14	21	-7

Fluminense declared as the Torneio Rio-São Paulo champions.

== State championship champions ==
State	Champion	State	Champion
Acre	Rio Branco-AC	Pará	Remo
Alagoas	CSA	Paraíba	Campinense
Amapá	Santana	Paraná	Coritiba
Amazonas	Fast	Pernambuco	Náutico
Bahia	Bahia	Piauí	River
Ceará	Fortaleza	Rio de Janeiro	Fonseca
Distrito Federal	Defelê	Rio Grande do Norte	ABC
Espírito Santo	Santo Antônio	Rio Grande do Sul	Grêmio
Goiás	Goiânia	Rondônia	Flamengo-RO
Guanabara	América	Roraima	-
Maranhão	Moto Club	Santa Catarina	Metropol
Mato Grosso	Dom Bosco	São Paulo	Santos
Mato Grosso do Sul	-	Sergipe	Santa Cruz-SE
Minas Gerais	Cruzeiro	Tocantins	-

== Brazilian clubs in international competitions ==
Team	Copa Libertadores 1960
Bahia	First Stage

== Brazil national team ==
The following table lists all the games played by the Brazil national football team in official competitions and friendly matches during 1960.

Date	Opposition	Result	Score	Brazil scorers	Competition
March 6, 1960	Mexico	D	2-2	Élton, Gilberto	Panamerican Championship
March 10, 1960	Costa Rica	L	0-3	-	Panamerican Championship
March 13, 1960	Argentina	L	1-2	Juarez	Panamerican Championship
March 15, 1960	Mexico	W	2-1	Mengálvio, Alfeu	Panamerican Championship
March 17, 1960	Costa Rica	W	4-0	Juarez (2), Élton (2)	Panamerican Championship
March 20, 1960	Argentina	W	1-0	Mílton Kuelle	Panamerican Championship
April 29, 1960	United Arab Republic	W	5-0	Pepe (2), Quarentinha (2), Garrincha	International Friendly
May 1, 1960	United Arab Republic	W	3-1	Pelé (3)	International Friendly
May 6, 1960	United Arab Republic	W	3-0	Quarentinha (2), Garrincha	International Friendly
May 8, 1960	(Sweden) Malmö	W	7-1	Quarentinha, Chinesinho (2), Pepe (2), Pelé (2)	International Friendly (unofficial match)
May 10, 1960	Denmark	W	4-3	Quarentinha (2), Pepe, Chinesinho	International Friendly
May 12, 1960	(Italy) Internazionale	D	2-2	Pelé (2)	International Friendly (unofficial match)
May 16, 1960	(Portugal) Sporting Lisboa	W	4-0	Garrincha, Pepe, Quarentinha, Almir Albuquerque	International Friendly (unofficial match)
May 26, 1960	Argentina	L	2-4	Djalma Santos, Delém	Roca Cup
May 29, 1960	Argentina	W	4-1	Delém (2), Julinho, Servílio	Roca Cup
June 29, 1960	Chile	W	4-0	Waldo (2), Dida, Vavá	International Friendly
July 3, 1960	Paraguay	W	2-1	Delém, Almir Albuquerque	Taça do Atlântico
July 9, 1960	Uruguay	L	0-1	-	Taça do Atlântico
July 12, 1960	Argentina	W	5-1	Pepe (2), Pelé, Delém, Chinesinho	Taça do Atlântico
