= Argentina–Mexico football rivalry =

Sports rivalry

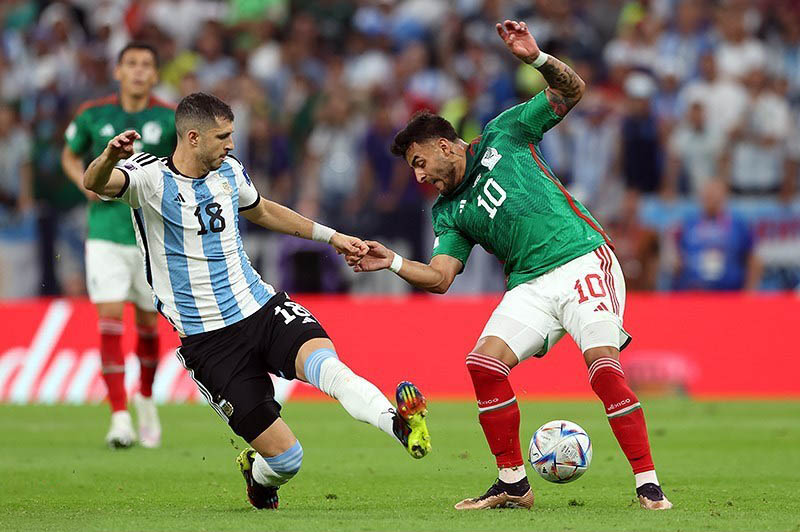
- A moment of the match played at the 2022 FIFA World Cup
- Location: The Americas; Argentina (CONMEBOL); Mexico (CONCACAF)
- Teams: Argentina; Mexico
- First meeting: 19 July 1930; FIFA World Cup; Argentina 6–3 Mexico
- Latest meeting: 26 November 2022; FIFA World Cup; Argentina 2–0 Mexico

Statistics
- Total meetings: 32
- Most wins: Argentina (16)
- Top scorer: Lionel Messi (4)
- All-time series: Argentina: 16; Drawn: 12; Mexico: 4
- Largest victory: Argentina 4–0 Mexico; Friendly (10 September 2019)

The Argentina–Mexico football rivalry is a sports rivalry that exists in some sports media in Mexico for the Argentina national team. Although the rivalry is not a very competitive one with Argentina holding 16 victories, 12 draws and only 4 losses in 32 meetings, the game draws a lot of attention from the media in Mexico. In fact, this rivalry is more keenly felt by Mexican supporters than Argentines, with the latter viewing Brazil, England, Uruguay, Germany, and the Netherlands as bigger rivals. A majority of Argentines do not consider Mexico as rivals. Even Mexican footballers and managers such as Raúl Jiménez or Miguel Herrera reject the existence of the rivalry. Argentina has not lost to Mexico since 2004, with the last 4 meetings being shutout victories. Mexico has not scored against Argentina since 2015 in a friendly.

== History ==
Although the first official match between both nations came in the 1930 FIFA World Cup where Argentina beat Mexico 6–3 in the group stage, the rivalry emerged during the late twentieth century, especially after the 1993 Copa América Final, where Argentina beat Mexico 2–1. That was the first time a non-CONMEBOL nation played in a Copa América final, and the first final played between both sides.

Managed by Alfio Basile, Argentina won the Copa América for the fourteenth time, defending their title won two years before. Argentina would not win another Copa America until 2021.

Overall, Argentina holds the edge in the rivalry in official matches, with sixteen victories, four by Mexico, and twelve draws.

Beyond the rivalry between both teams, many Argentine coaches have served as managers of Mexican teams. Meanwhile, César Menotti is widely recognised for his work with the Mexico national team, Nevertheless, other Argentines who managed Mexico in subsecquent years (such as Ricardo LaVolpe or more recently Gerardo Martino) were heavily criticized by the local media despite some good results leading the team. Former Mexican player and manager Hugo Sánchez has always been reluctant with the idea of having foreign managers.

During the 2022 FIFA World Cup held in Qatar, there was animosity between fans of both sides. Prior to the match between both teams, some Mexican and Argentine fans had a fight in Doha. Both supporters fought again inside Lusail Stadium after Argentina's victory. Previously, Mexican fans, alongside a portion of Uruguayan fans, had been singing a song that included political and social references to the Falklands War singing "Come to see! Come to see! In the Falklands, English language is spoken", with the word Falklands intentionally included, considering that the islands are named Malvinas in Spanish, regardless of any political position. This intentional aggression sparked outrage of the Argentine fans towards them.

== Comparison in major tournaments ==
Key

Denotes which team finished better in that particular competition.
DNQ: Did not qualify.
DNP: Did not participate.
TBD: To be determined.

Tournament	Argentina	Mexico	Notes
1930 FIFA World Cup	2nd	13th	In the group stage, Argentina defeated Mexico 6–3.
1934 FIFA World Cup	10th	DNQ	
1938 FIFA World Cup	Withdrew		
1950 FIFA World Cup	Withdrew	12th	
1954 FIFA World Cup	Withdrew	13th	
1958 FIFA World Cup	13th	11th	
1962 FIFA World Cup	8th	11th	
1966 FIFA World Cup	5th	12th	
1970 FIFA World Cup	DNQ	6th	Tournament hosted by Mexico.
1974 FIFA World Cup	8th	DNQ	
1978 FIFA World Cup	1st	16th	Tournament hosted by Argentina.
1982 FIFA World Cup	11th	DNQ	
1986 FIFA World Cup	1st	6th	Tournament hosted by Mexico.
1990 FIFA World Cup	2nd	Disqualified	
1993 Copa América	1st	2nd	In the group stage, the match ended 0–0. The two would meet again in the final, where Argentina defeated Mexico 2–1.
1994 FIFA World Cup	7th	13th	
1995 Copa América	5th	7th	
1997 Copa América	3rd	6th	
1998 FIFA World Cup	6th	13th	
1999 Copa América	3rd	8th	
2001 Copa América	Withdrew	2nd	
2002 FIFA World Cup	18th	11th	
2004 Copa América	2nd	6th	In the group stage, Mexico defeated Argentina 1–0.
2006 FIFA World Cup	6th	15th	In the Round of 16, Argentina defeated Mexico 2–1.
2007 Copa América	2nd	3rd	In the semifinals, Argentina defeated Mexico 3–0.
2010 FIFA World Cup	5th	14th	In the Round of 16, Argentina defeated Mexico 3–1.
2011 Copa América	7th	11th	Tournament hosted by Argentina.
2014 FIFA World Cup	2nd	10th	
2015 Copa América	2nd	12th	
2016 Copa América	2nd	7th	
2018 FIFA World Cup	16th	12th	
2022 FIFA World Cup	1st	22nd	In the group stage, Argentina defeated Mexico 2–0.
2024 Copa América	1st	9th	
2026 FIFA World Cup	2nd	9th	Tournament hosted by Mexico, the United States and Canada.
2030 FIFA World Cup	TBD		

== List of matches ==
The chart includes the complete list of matches played between both teams:

#	Date	City	Venue	Winner	Score	Competition	Goals (Arg)	Goals (Mex)
1	19 Jul 1930	Montevideo	Centenario	Argentina	6–3	1930 World Cup	Stábile (3), Zumelzú (2), Varallo	Rosas (2), Gayón
2	13 Mar 1956	Mexico City	Olímpico Universitario	(Draw)	0–0	1956 Panamerican		
3	10 Mar 1960	San José	Estadio Nacional	Argentina	3–2	1960 Panamerican	Belén (2), Nardiello	H. Hernández, C. González
4	17 Mar 1960	San José	Estadio Nacional	Argentina	2–0	1960 Panamerican	Jiménez, Nardiello	
5	28 Mar 1962	Buenos Aires		Argentina	1–0	Friendly		
6	22 Aug 1967	Mexico City		Mexico	2–1	Friendly	?	Fragoso (2)
7	6 Feb 1973	Mexico City		Mexico	2–0	Friendly		E. Borja, F. Bustos
8	31 Aug 1975	Mexico City	Estadio Azteca	(Draw) (Note: Regraded as full international match for Mexico but not for Argentina.)	1–1	Mexico City Cup	Coscia	F. Vargas
9	18 Sep 1984	Monterrey	Estadio Universitario	(Draw)	1–1	Friendly	Burruchaga	Negrete
10	25 Oct 1984	Buenos Aires	José Amalfitani	(Draw) (Note: Suspended at 85' due to pitch invasion.)	1–1	Friendly	Gareca	Flores
11	14 Nov 1985	Los Angeles	Memorial Coliseum	(Draw)	1–1	Friendly	Maradona	
12	17 Nov 1985	Puebla	Estadio Cuauhtémoc	(Draw)	1–1	Friendly	Ruggeri	Aguirre
13	17 Jan 1990	Los Angeles	Memorial Coliseum	Mexico	2–0	Friendly		C. Muñoz, Zague
14	13 Mar 1991	Buenos Aires	José Amalfitani	(Draw)	0–0	Friendly		
15	20 Jun 1993	Guayaquil	Estadio Monumental	(Draw)	0–0	1993 Copa América	Ruggeri	Patiño
16	4 Jul 1993	Guayaquil	Estadio Monumental	Argentina	2–1	1993 Copa América	Batistuta (2)	Galindo
17	10 Feb 1999	Los Angeles	Memorial Coliseum	Argentina	1–0	Friendly	Sorín	
18	9 Jun 1999	Chicago	Soldier Field	(Draw)	2–2	Reebok Cup	J. Cruz, G. López	L. Hernández, P. Chávez
19	20 Dec 2000	Los Angeles	Memorial Coliseum	Argentina	2–0	Reebok Cup	Solari, Galletti	
20	4 Feb 2003	Los Angeles	Memorial Coliseum	Argentina	1–0	Friendly	G.J. Rodríguez	
21	10 Jul 2004	Chiclayo	Elías Aguirre	Mexico	1–0	2004 Copa América		R. Morales
22	9 Mar 2005	Los Angeles	Memorial Coliseum	(Draw)	1–1	Friendly	R. Zárate	Fuentes
23	26 May 2005	Hanover	Niedersachsenstadion	(Draw) (Note: Argentina won on penalty shoot-out.)	1–1 (a.e.t.) (6–5 p)	2005 Confed Cup	Figueroa	Salcido
24	24 Jun 2006	Leipzig	Zentralstadion	Argentina	2–1	2006 World Cup	Crespo, M. Rodríguez	Márquez
25	11 Jul 2007	Puerto Ordaz	Cachamay	Argentina	3–0	2007 Copa América	Heinze, Messi, Riquelme	
26	4 Jun 2008	San Diego	Qualcomm Stadium	Argentina	4–1	Friendly	Burdisso, Messi, M. Rodríguez, Agüero	Sinha
27	27 Jun 2010	Johannesburg	Soccer City	Argentina	3–1	2010 World Cup	Tevez (2), Higuaín	J. Hernández
28	8 Sep 2015	Arlington	AT&T Stadium	(Draw)	2–2	Friendly	Agüero, Messi	J. Hernández, Herrera
29	16 Nov 2018	Córdoba	Mario A. Kempes	Argentina	2–0	Friendly	Funes Mori, Brizuela (o.g.)	
30	20 Nov 2018	Mendoza	Malvinas Argentinas	Argentina	2–0	Friendly	Icardi, Dybala	
31	10 Sep 2019	San Antonio	Alamodome	Argentina	4–0	Friendly	L. Martínez (3), Paredes	
32	26 Nov 2022	Lusail	Lusail Stadium	Argentina	2–0	2022 World Cup	Messi, E. Fernández	

== Statistics ==
Competition	Played	Arg. won	Draw	Mex. won
FIFA World Cup	4	4	0	0
FIFA Confederations Cup	1	0	1	0
Copa América	4	2	1	1
Panamerican Championship	3	2	1	0
Friendlies	20	8	9	3
Total	32	16	12	4

=== Official titles comparison ===
Senior titles	Argentina	Mexico
World Cup	3	0
FIFA Confederations Cup	1	1
CONMEBOL–UEFA Cup of Champions	2	0
Copa América / CONCACAF Championship and Gold Cup	16	12
Panamerican / CONCACAF Nations League	1	1
Total	23	14

== Club competition ==
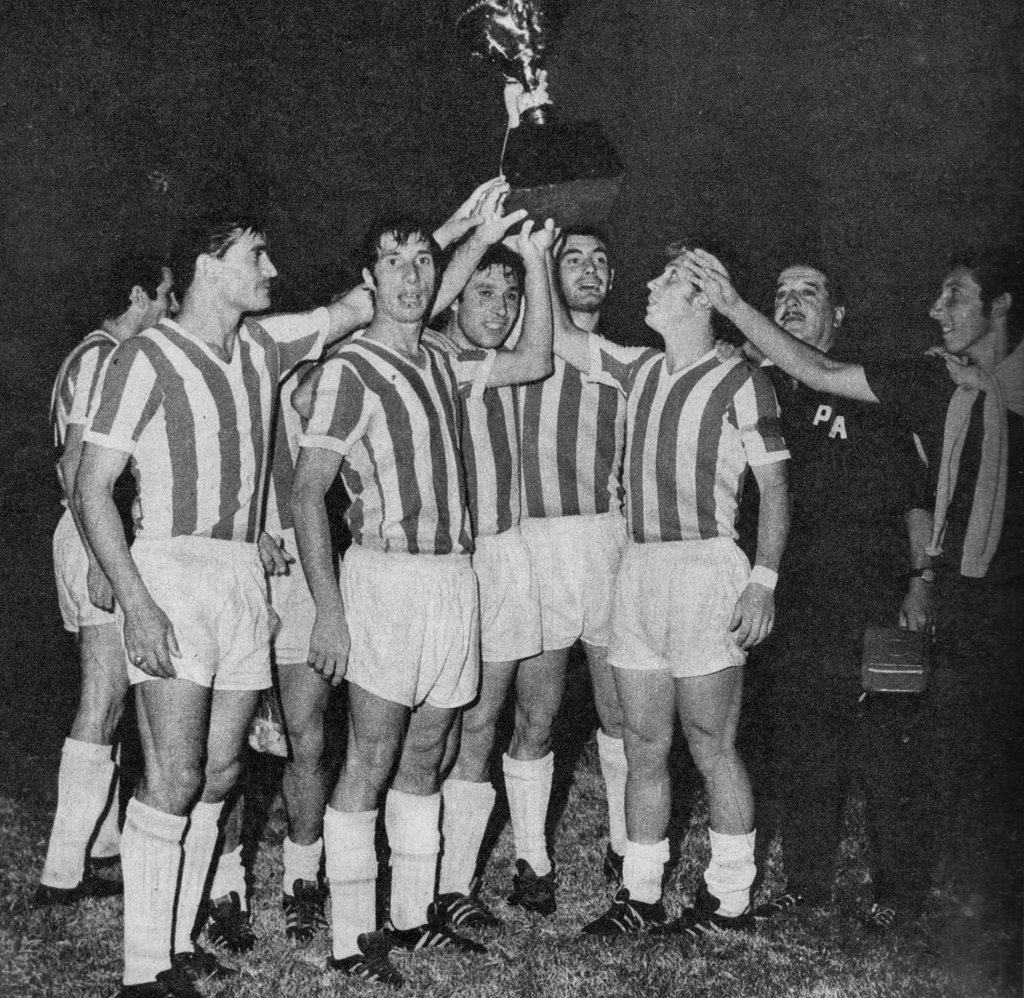
Players of Estudiantes (LP) raising the Copa Interamericana won over Toluca in 1968

At club level, Argentine and Mexican teams met for the first time at Copa Interamericana, a defunct competition contested by Conmebol and Concacaf club champions. In the first edition of the tournament (1968), Estudiantes de La Plata beat Toluca after a two-legged and a playoff series, winning the first trophy for South America.

The first Mexican win over an Argentine side in Copa Interamericana came in 1977 when Club América defeated Boca Juniors. After both teams won one match each, a playoff was held in Mexico City, where América won 2–1 to achieve their first title.

The rivalry between both nations at club level increased during the late 1990s, when Mexican clubs were invited to participate in Copa Libertadores. After Mexican representatives were eliminated on round of 16 in 1998, in the 2000 edition América lost to Boca Juniors in semifinals (5–4 on aggregate). The progress of Mexican sides in the competition was clearly evident in 2001 when Cruz Azul became the first Mexican team to play a final, being defeated by Boca Juniors on penalties after winning one game each (as visitor teams). Previously, Cruz Azul had eliminated Cerro Porteño (round of 16) and two Argentine teams, River Plate and Rosario Central (in quarter and semifinals respectively).

The most controversial game between Mexican and Argentine teams in club competitions occurred in 2005, when Guadalajara faced Boca Juniors in quarter finals. In the first leg, Guadalajara beat Boca Juniors 4–0, being considered one of the greatest achievements of Mexican teams over Argentine rivals. In the second leg at La Bombonera, Chivas player Adolfo Bautista mock Boca Juniors supporters which caused Martín Palermo beat him. As a result, both were sent off while Boca Juniors coach, Jorge Benítez, spit at Bautista's face. The final 0–0 score eliminated Boca Juniors from the competition and the match passed into history as an embarrassing scandal. Benítez's misconduct caused Boca Juniors fired him after the incident.

Tigres UANL became the second Mexican team to play a Copa Libertadores final in 2015, but they lost to River Plate (0–3 on aggregate). After the 2017 edition, Mexican teams would decline to participate in Copa Libertadores due to scheduling problems.

== See also ==
- Argentina–Mexico relations
