= Ênio Rodrigues =

Brazilian footballer (1930–2002)

Personal information
- Full name: Ênio Antônio Rodrigues da Silva
- Date of birth: 10 November 1930
- Place of birth: Porto Alegre, Brazil
- Date of death: 16 January 2002 (aged 71)
- Place of death: Porto Alegre, Brazil
- Position: Defender

Youth career
- Humaitá FC

Senior career*
Years	Team	Apps	(Gls)
1948–1950	GS Força e Luz		
1950–1954	Renner		
1954–1961	Grêmio	315	(4)

International career
1956–1960	Brazil	6	(0)

Managerial career
- 1960: Grêmio (caretaker)
- 1961–1962: Grêmio
- 1964: Pelotas
- * Club domestic league appearances and goals

Ênio Antônio Rodrigues da Silva (10 November 1930 – 16 January 2002), better known as Ênio Rodrigues, was a Brazilian professional footballer and manager, who played as a defender.

== Career ==
Born in Baixada, the neighborhood where Grêmio FBPA was founded, Rodrigues began his career at Humaita Football Club, and later became a professional at GS Força e Luz. He played for Renner and was part of the state champion team in 1954, arriving at Grêmio the following season, where he was five-time state champion and made more than 315 appearances, becoming team captain.

Rodrigues also made six appearances for the Brazil national team in total, with emphasis on his participation in the 1956 and 1960 Panamerican Championship. Also did some work as a manager, being a caretaker in 1960, and in 1961–1962 for Grêmio, in addition to coaching EC Pelotas in 1964.

== Death ==
Ênio Rodrigues died on 16 January 2002, while waiting for a liver transplant.

== Honours ==
=== Player ===
Renner

- Campeonato Gaúcho: 1954
- Campeonato Citadino de Porto Alegre: 1954

Grêmio

- Campeonato Gaúcho: 1956, 1957, 1958, 1959, 1960
- Campeonato Citadino de Porto Alegre: 1956, 1957, 1958, 1959, 1960

Brazil

- Panamerican Championship: 1956

=== Manager ===
Grêmio

- Campeonato Gaúcho: 1962
- Campeonato Sul-Brasileiro: 1962
