= 1960 São Paulo FC season =

São Paulo
1960 season
- Chairman: Laudo Natel
- Manager: Vicente Feola; Remo Januzzi; Flávio Costa
- Torneio Rio-São Paulo: 7th
- Campeonato Paulista: 8th

The 1960 football season was São Paulo's 31st season since club's existence.

== Overall ==
Games played	72 (9 Torneio Rio-São Paulo, 34 Campeonato Paulista, 29 Friendly match)
Games won	32 (2 Torneio Rio-São Paulo, 13 Campeonato Paulista, 17 Friendly match)
Games drawn	18 (3 Torneio Rio-São Paulo, 11 Campeonato Paulista, 4 Friendly match)
Games lost	22 (4 Torneio Rio-São Paulo, 10 Campeonato Paulista, 8 Friendly match)
Goals scored	150
Goals conceded	107
Goal difference	+43
Best result	7–1 (A) v Mirassol - Friendly match - 1960.06.29; 7–1 (H) v Taubaté - Campeonato Paulista - 1960.10.05
Worst result	2–7 (A) v Fluminense - Torneio Rio-São Paulo - 1960.03.20
Most appearances	
Top scorer	

Source: São Paulo FC

== Friendlies ==
January 7 Torneo de Cali	América de Cali (Colombia)	2–2	(Brazil) São Paulo	Cali
	Goal		Goal

January 9 Torneo de Cali	Huracán (Argentina)	0–1	(Brazil) São Paulo	Cali
			Goal

January 13 Torneo de Cali	Deportivo Cali (Colombia)	1–4	(Brazil) São Paulo	Cali
	Goal		Goal

January 17 Torneo de Medellín	Atlético Nacional (Colombia)	0–4	(Brazil) São Paulo	Medellín
			Goal	Stadium: Estadio Atanasio Girardot

January 21 Torneo de Medellín	Huracán (Argentina)	2–0	(Brazil) São Paulo	Medellín
	Goal			Stadium: Estadio Atanasio Girardot

January 24 Torneo de Medellín	Independiente Medellín (Colombia)	2–1	(Brazil) São Paulo	Medellín
	Goal		Goal	Stadium: Estadio Atanasio Girardot

February 3 Torneo de Guadalajara	Guadalajara (Mexico)	0–6	(Brazil) São Paulo	Guadalajara
			Goal	Stadium: Estadio Jalisco

February 6 Torneo de Guadalajara	Atlas (Mexico)	0–0	(Brazil) São Paulo	Guadalajara
				Stadium: Estadio Jalisco

February 11 Torneo de Guadalajara	San Lorenzo (Argentina)	2–2	(Brazil) São Paulo	Guadalajara
	Goal		Goal	Stadium: Estadio Jalisco

February 14 International	León (Mexico)	2–3	(Brazil) São Paulo	León
	Goal		Goal

February 17 Torneo de Guadalajara	Oro (Mexico)	0–4	(Brazil) São Paulo	Guadalajara
			Goal	Stadium: Estadio Jalisco

February 20 International	Tampico (Mexico)	1–3	(Brazil) São Paulo	Tampico
	Goal		Goal	Stadium: Estadio Olimpico Universitario

February 26 International	Boca Juniors (Argentina)	5–2	(Brazil) São Paulo	Buenos Aires
	Goal		Goal	Stadium: Estadio Tomás Adolfo Ducó

May 5 Troféu Roberto Ugolini	Portuguesa	2–0	São Paulo	São Paulo
	Goal			Stadium: Estádio Municipal Paulo Machado de Carvalho (Pacaembu)

May 7 National	EC São Bernardo	0–5	São Paulo	São Bernardo do Campo
			Goal

May 12 Troféu Roberto Ugolini	Juventus	1–3	São Paulo	São Paulo
	Goal		Goal	Stadium: Estádio Conde Rodolfo Crespi (Rua Javari)

May 14 National	Portuguesa Santista	1–0	São Paulo	Santos
	Goal			Stadium: Estádio Ulrico Mursa

May 22 Troféu Roberto Ugolini	Corinthians	1–1	São Paulo	São Paulo
	Goal		Goal	Stadium: Estádio Alfredo Schürig (Parque São Jorge)

May 29 National	Vasco da Gama	4–2	São Paulo	Rio de Janeiro
	Goal		Goal	Stadium: Estádio Vasco da Gama (São Januário)

June 1 Troféu Roberto Ugolini	Palmeiras	1–0	São Paulo	São Paulo
	Goal			Stadium: Estádio Municipal Paulo Machado de Carvalho (Pacaembu)

June 3 National	São Paulo	1–0	Grêmio	São Paulo
	Goal			Stadium: Estádio Municipal Paulo Machado de Carvalho (Pacaembu)

June 13 National	Ranchariense	1–2	São Paulo	Rancharia
	Goal		Goal

June 29 National	Mirassol	1–7	São Paulo	Mirassol
	Goal		Goal

October 2 Morumbi Official Inauguration	São Paulo (Brazil)	1–0	(Portugal) Sporting	São Paulo
	Goal			Stadium: Estádio Cícero Pompeu de Toledo (Morumbi)

October 9 Troféu Dep. Mendonça Falcão	São Paulo (Brazil)	3–0	(Uruguay) Nacional	São Paulo
	Goal			Stadium: Estádio Cícero Pompeu de Toledo (Morumbi)

October 31 National	Nitro-Química	1–2	São Paulo	São Paulo
	Goal		Goal

November 4 National	Bandeirantes	0–3	São Paulo	São Carlos
			Goal

December 8 National	São Paulo	0–1	Bangu	São Paulo
			Goal	Stadium: Estádio Cícero Pompeu de Toledo (Morumbi)

== Official competitions ==
=== Torneio Rio-São Paulo ===
March 10 1	São Paulo	2–1	America-RJ	São Paulo
	Goal		Goal	Stadium: Estádio Municipal Paulo Machado de Carvalho (Pacaembu)

March 16 2	São Paulo	1–2	Vasco da Gama	São Paulo
	Goal		Goal	Stadium: Estádio Municipal Paulo Machado de Carvalho (Pacaembu)

March 20 3	Fluminense	7–2	São Paulo	Rio de Janeiro
	Goal		Goal	Stadium: Estádio Municipal do Rio de Janeiro (Maracanã)

March 30 4	São Paulo	1–0	Portuguesa	São Paulo
	Goal			Stadium: Estádio Municipal Paulo Machado de Carvalho (Pacaembu)

April 2 5	Botafogo	3–2	São Paulo	Rio de Janeiro
	Goal		Goal	Stadium: Estádio Municipal do Rio de Janeiro (Maracanã)

April 6 6	Palmeiras	4–1	São Paulo	São Paulo
	Goal		Goal	Stadium: Estádio Municipal Paulo Machado de Carvalho (Pacaembu)

April 10 7	Corinthians	0–0	São Paulo	São Paulo
				Stadium: Estádio Municipal Paulo Machado de Carvalho (Pacaembu)

April 12 8	São Paulo	1–1	Flamengo	São Paulo
	Goal		Goal	Stadium: Estádio Municipal Paulo Machado de Carvalho (Pacaembu)

April 21 9	São Paulo	1–1	Santos	São Paulo
	Goal		Goal	Stadium: Estádio Municipal Paulo Machado de Carvalho (Pacaembu)

==== Record ====
Final Position	Points	Matches	Wins	Draws	Losses	Goals For	Goals Away	Win%
7th	7	9	2	3	4	11	19	38%

=== Campeonato Paulista ===
June 11 1	São Paulo	1–1	Noroeste	São Paulo
	Goal		Goal	Stadium: Estádio Municipal Paulo Machado de Carvalho (Pacaembu)

June 15 2	São Paulo	1–2	Botafogo	São Paulo
	Goal		Goal	Stadium: Estádio Municipal Paulo Machado de Carvalho (Pacaembu)

June 19 3	Comercial	4–1	São Paulo	Ribeirão Preto
	Goal		Goal	Stadium: Costa Coelho

June 26 4	São Paulo	1–1	Juventus	São Paulo
	Goal		Goal	Stadium: Estádio Municipal Paulo Machado de Carvalho (Pacaembu)

July 16 5	São Paulo	4–1	Jabaquara	São Paulo
	Goal		Goal	Stadium: Estádio Municipal Paulo Machado de Carvalho (Pacaembu)

July 24 6	São Paulo	2–2	Palmeiras	São Paulo
	Goal		Goal	Stadium: Estádio Municipal Paulo Machado de Carvalho (Pacaembu)

July 28 7	São Paulo	3–0	América-SP	São Paulo
	Goal			Stadium: Estádio Municipal Paulo Machado de Carvalho (Pacaembu)

August 4 8	Portuguesa Santista	0–0	São Paulo	Santos
				Stadium: Estádio Ulrico Mursa

August 7 9	XV de Piracicaba	3–3	São Paulo	Piracicaba
	Goal		Goal	Stadium: Estádio Roberto Gomes Pedroza

August 10 10	Portuguesa	2–1	São Paulo	São Paulo
	Goal		Goal	Stadium: Estádio Independência (Canindé)

August 21 11	Corinthians (PP)	2–6	São Paulo	Presidente Prudente
	Goal		Goal	Stadium: Estádio Parque São Jorge

August 25 12	São Paulo	1–1	Guarani	São Paulo
	Goal		Goal	Stadium: Estádio Municipal Paulo Machado de Carvalho (Pacaembu)

August 28 13	São Paulo	1–3	Ferroviária	São Paulo
	Goal		Goal	Stadium: Estádio Municipal Paulo Machado de Carvalho (Pacaembu)

August 31 14	Santos	1–1	São Paulo	Santos
	Goal		Goal	Stadium: Estádio Urbano Caldeira (Vila Belmiro)

September 4 15	Taubaté	0–3	São Paulo	Taubaté
			Goal	Stadium: Campo do Bosque

September 11 16	Ponte Preta	0–0	São Paulo	Campinas
				Stadium: Estádio Moisés Lucarelli

September 15 17	Corinthians	3–1	São Paulo	São Paulo
	Goal		Goal	Stadium: Estádio Municipal Paulo Machado de Carvalho (Pacaembu)

September 18 18	Botafogo	3–0	São Paulo	Ribeirão Preto
	Goal			Stadium: Estádio Luís Pereira (Vila Tibério)

September 24 19	São Paulo	3–3	Comercial	São Paulo
	Goal		Goal	Stadium: Estádio Municipal Paulo Machado de Carvalho (Pacaembu)

October 5 20	São Paulo	7–1	Taubaté	São Paulo
	Goal		Goal	Stadium: Estádio Municipal Paulo Machado de Carvalho (Pacaembu)

October 16 21	Noroeste	5–2	São Paulo	Bauru
	Goal		Goal	Stadium: Estádio Ubaldo de Medeiros

October 19 22	Palmeiras	2–0	São Paulo	São Paulo
	Goal			Stadium: Estádio Cícero Pompeu de Toledo (Morumbi)

October 23 23	São Paulo	3–0	Corinthians (PP)	São Paulo
	Goal			Stadium: Estádio Cícero Pompeu de Toledo (Morumbi)

November 6 24	Ferroviária	1–1	São Paulo	Araraquara
	Goal		Goal	Stadium: Estádio Doutor Adhemar de Barros (Fonte Luminosa)

November 10 25	Juventus	0–3	São Paulo	São Paulo
			Goal	Stadium: Estádio Conde Rodolfo Crespi (Rua Javari)

November 13 26	América-SP	2–2	São Paulo	São José do Rio Preto
	Goal		Goal	Stadium: Estádio Mário Alves de Mendonça

November 16 27	São Paulo	2–0	XV de Piracicaba	São Paulo
	Goal			Stadium: Estádio Municipal Paulo Machado de Carvalho (Pacaembu)

November 20 28	Guarani	2–1	São Paulo	Campinas
	Goal		Goal	Stadium: Estádio Brinco de Ouro da Princesa

November 23 29	São Paulo	4–1	Corinthians	São Paulo
	Goal		Goal	Stadium: Estádio Municipal Paulo Machado de Carvalho (Pacaembu)

November 27 30	Jabaquara	2–3	São Paulo	Santos
	Goal		Goal	Stadium: Estádio Urbano Caldeira (Vila Belmiro)

December 4 31	Portuguesa	4–3	São Paulo	São Paulo
	Goal		Goal	Stadium: Estádio Cícero Pompeu de Toledo (Morumbi)

December 11 32	Santos	1–2	São Paulo	São Paulo
	Goal		Goal	Stadium: Estádio Cícero Pompeu de Toledo (Morumbi)

December 15 33	São Paulo	3–1	Portuguesa Santista	São Paulo
	Goal		Goal	Stadium: Estádio Municipal Paulo Machado de Carvalho (Pacaembu)

December 20 34	São Paulo	5–0	Ponte Preta	São Paulo
	Goal			Stadium: Estádio Municipal Paulo Machado de Carvalho (Pacaembu)

==== Record ====
Final Position	Points	Matches	Wins	Draws	Losses	Goals For	Goals Away	Win%
8th	37	34	13	11	10	74	56	54%
