= Walter Jiménez =

Walter Jiménez may refer to:

- Walter Jiménez (footballer, born 1939) (1939-2023), Argentine football forward
- Walter Jiménez (footballer, born 1977), Argentine football midfielder
