= Orlando Rosa =

Orlando Rosa may refer to:

- Orlando Rosa (footballer), Orlando Rosa Romagna (1932–2011), Brazilian football defender
- Orlando Rosa (wrestler), Orlando Rosa (born 1977), Puerto Rican wrestler
- Orlando Rosa Pinto (1911–unknown), Brazilian football midfielder
