= Pedro Callá =

Argentine footballer

Personal information
- Date of birth: 1 January 1934 (age 92)
- Position: Forward

International career
| Years | Team | Apps | (Gls) |
| 1959–1962 | Argentina | 12 | (2) |

Pedro Callá (born 1 January 1934) is an Argentine former footballer. He played in twelve matches for the Argentina national football team from 1959 to 1962. He was also part of Argentina's squad for the 1959 South American Championship that took place in Argentina.

== Honours ==
The Strongest

- Bolivian Primera División: 1952

Boca Juniors

- Primera División: 1962, 1964
- Copa Libertadores runner-up: 1963

Argentina

- Copa América: 1959
- Panamerican Championship: 1960
