= Juarez Teixeira =

Brazilian footballer (1928–2026)

Juarez
Personal information
- Full name: Juarez Teixeira
- Date of birth: 20 September 1928
- Place of birth: Blumenau, Santa Catarina, Brazil
- Date of death: 6 April 2026 (aged 97)
- Place of death: Porto Alegre, Rio Grande do Sul, Brazil
- Position: Forward

Senior career*
Years	Team	Apps	(Gls)
1948	Blumenau		
1949–1950	Olímpico-SC		
1950–1953	Jabaquara		
1953	Ferroviário-PR		
1954	Caxias-SC		
1955–1963	Grêmio	306	(204)
1961	→ Newell's Old Boys (loan)		
1963	Bagé		

International career
1956–1960	Brazil	8	(3)
- * Club domestic league appearances and goals

Juarez Teixeira (20 September 1928 – 6 April 2026) was a Brazilian professional footballer who played as a forward.

== Career ==
A center forward highlighted by his enormous physical strength, Juarez had a successful career, being state champion in Santa Catarina for Olímpico de Blumenau and Caxias de Joinville, in addition to a victory in Paraná for CA Ferroviário. In 1955 he arrived at Grêmio where he made history, with 306 appearances and 204 goals, being the team's top scorer in the late 1950s.

Teixeira also made eight appearances for the Brazil national team in total, with emphasis on his participation in the 1956 and 1960 Panamerican Championship.

== Death ==
Teixeira died in Porto Alegre, Rio Grande do Sul on 6 April 2026, at the age of 97.

== Honours ==
Olímpico

- Campeonato Catarinense: 1949

Ferroviário

- Campeonato Paranaense: 1953

Caxias-SC

- Campeonato Catarinense: 1954

Grêmio

- Campeonato Gaúcho: 1956, 1957, 1958, 1959, 1960, 1962
- Campeonato Sul-Brasileiro: 1962
- Campeonato Citadino de Porto Alegre: 1956, 1957, 1958, 1959

Brazil

- Panamerican Championship: 1956
