= Milton Kuelle =

Brazilian footballer

Personal information
- Full name: Milton Martins Kuelle
- Date of birth: 22 August 1933 (age 93)
- Place of birth: Porto Alegre, Brazil
- Position: Attacking midfielder

Youth career
- –1951: Grêmio

Senior career*
Years	Team	Apps	(Gls)
1952–1964	Grêmio	511	(129)

International career
1956–1960	Brazil	6	(1)

Managerial career
- 1972: Grêmio
- * Club domestic league appearances and goals as of 8 February 2024

Milton Kuelle (born 22 August 1933), is a former Brazilian footballer who played as an attacking midfielder.

== Career ==
Formed in Grêmio's own youth categories, Kuelle was one of the main players in Grêmio's transition era from the old Baixada stadium to the Olímpico Monumental. He spent his entire career at the club, playing 511 matches and scoring 129 goals, participating in winning eight state championships. He was also a director of Grêmio and had a brief spell as manager in 1972.

Kuelle also made 6 appearances for the Brazil national team in total, with emphasis on his participation in the 1956 and 1960 Panamerican Championship.

== Personal life ==
After retiring, he graduated in dentistry, including later working at Grêmio FBPA. He was also a councilor in the city of Porto Alegre in the 1960s.

== Honours ==
Grêmio

- Campeonato Gaúcho: 1956, 1957, 1958, 1959, 1960, 1962, 1963, 1964
- Campeonato Sul-Brasileiro: 1962
- Campeonato Citadino de Porto Alegre: 1956, 1957, 1958, 1959, 1960, 1964

Brazil

- Panamerican Championship: 1956
