= Gessy Lima =

Brazilian footballer

Gessy
Personal information
- Full name: Gessy Lima
- Date of birth: 24 September 1935
- Place of birth: Uruguaiana, Brazil
- Date of death: 4 April 1989 (aged 53)
- Place of death: Porto Alegre, Brazil
- Position: Forward

Senior career*
Years	Team	Apps	(Gls)
1950–1954	Uruguaiana		
1955	Ferro Carril-RS		
1955–1962	Grêmio	302	(208)
1963	Portuguesa		

International career
1960	Brazil	4	(0)
- * Club domestic league appearances and goals as of 9 February 2024

Gessy Lima (24 September 1935 – 4 April 1989), was a Brazilian professional footballer who played as a forward.

== Career ==
Born in Uruguaiana, Gessy Lima earned the nickname "Paradoxal Craque" at Grêmio. In a friendly against Boca Juniors at La Bombonera on 26 February 1959, he scored four goals in the match. He made 302 appearances for the club and scored 208 goals.

Gessy also made 4 appearances for the Brazil national team in total, during the 1960 Panamerican Championship.

== Honours ==
Grêmio

- Campeonato Gaúcho: 1956, 1957, 1958, 1959, 1960, 1962
- Campeonato Citadino de Porto Alegre: 1956, 1957, 1958, 1959, 1960
