= 1960 Panamerican Championship =

Tournament details
- Country: Costa Rica
- Venue: Estadio Nacional
- Dates: 6–20 March
- Teams: 4

Final positions
- Champions: Argentina (1st title)
- Runners-up: Brazil
- Third place: Mexico
- Fourth place: Costa Rica

Tournament statistics
- Matches played: 12
- Goals scored: 32 (2.67 per match)
- Top goal scorer(s): Five players (3 goals each)

The 1960 Panamerican Championship was the third and final edition of the Panamerican Championship, an international football tournament featuring national teams from North, Central and South America. It was hosted in San José, Costa Rica, between March 6 and March 20, in 1960. All the matches were held at Estadio Nacional.

Four teams played in a double round-robin tournament, it was won by Argentina.

== Teams ==
Confederation	Team	Qualification Path
Host	Costa Rica	Host and 1960 CCCF Championship Champions; CCCF and NAFC 1958 Championship Runners-up
Conmebol (South America)	Brazil; Argentina	Defending Champions of 1956 Panamerican Championship; Champion of 1959 South American Championship (Argentina)
NAFC (North America)	Mexico	CCCF and NAFC 1958 Championship Champions

== Venue ==
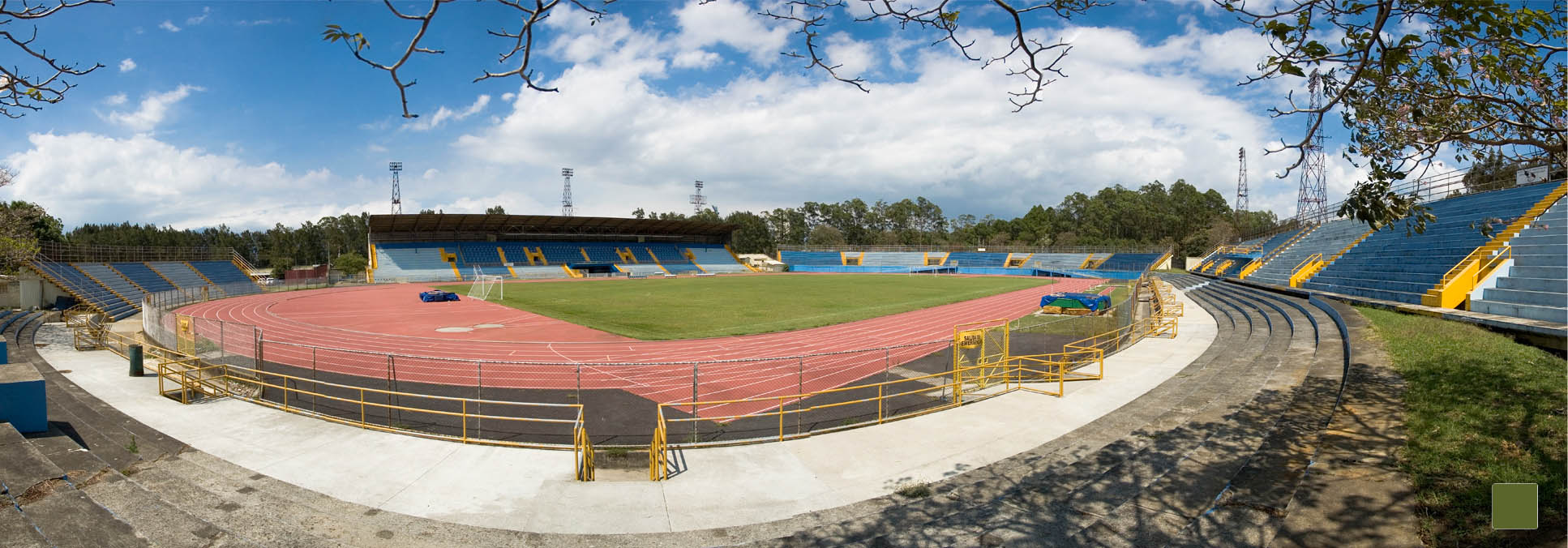
Estadio Nacional, venue

== Final table ==
Rank	Team	Pts	Pld	W	D	L	GF	GA	GD
1	Argentina	9	6	4	1	1	9	4	5
2	Brazil	7	6	3	1	2	10	8	2
3	Mexico	4	6	1	2	3	9	10	–1
4	Costa Rica	4	6	1	2	3	4	10	–6

== Match details ==
6 March 1960

Mexico	2–2	Brazil
Mercado 82'; Contreras 87'	Report	Élton 17'; Gilberto 65'

Estadio Nacional, San José
Attendance: 30,000
Referee: Juan Soto Paris (Costa Rica)

8 March 1960

Argentina	0–0	Costa Rica
	Report

Estadio Nacional, San José
Referee: Arthur Villarino (Brazil)

10 March 1960

Argentina	3–2	Mexico
Belén 10', 78'; Nardiello 11'	Report	Hernández 34'; González 40'

Estadio Nacional, San José
Attendance: 20,000
Referee: Arthur Villarino (Brazil)

10 March 1960

Costa Rica	3–0	Brazil
Valenciano 14'; Quesada 28'; Rojas 76'	Report

Estadio Nacional, San José
Attendance: 25,000
Referee: Luis Antonio Ventre (Argentina)

13 March 1960

Costa Rica	1–1	Mexico
Valenciano 35'	Report	Hernández 62'

Estadio Nacional, San José
Referee: Luis Antonio Ventre (Argentina)

13 March 1960

Argentina	2–1	Brazil
Nardiello 5'; Belén 55'	Report	Juarez 60'

Estadio Nacional, San José
Referee: Rafael Valenzuela (Mexico)

15 March 1960

Argentina	2–0	Costa Rica
Onega 12'; D'Ascenso 79'	Report

Estadio Nacional, San José
Referee: Rafael Valenzuela (Mexico)

15 March 1960

Brazil	2–1	Mexico
Alfeu 5'; Mengálvio 34'	Report	Mercado 44'

Estadio Nacional, San José
Referee: Juan Soto Paris (Costa Rica)

17 March 1960

Argentina	2–0	Mexico
Jiménez 21'; Nardiello 70'	Report

Estadio Nacional, San José
Attendance: 30,000
Referee: Juan Soto Paris (Costa Rica)

17 March 1960

Costa Rica	0–4	Brazil
	Report	Juarez 28', 31'; Élton 87', 89'

Estadio Nacional, San José
Referee: Luis Antonio Ventre (Argentina)

20 March 1960

Costa Rica	0–3	Mexico
	Report	González 19'; Águila 61'; Mercado 86'

Estadio Nacional, San José
Attendance: 18,000
Referee: Luis Antonio Ventre (Argentina)

20 March 1960

Brazil	1–0	Argentina
Kuelle 65'

Estadio Nacional, San José
Referee: Juan Soto Paris (Costa Rica)

Team details

Brazil
Argentina

GK	Suly
DF	Orlando Rosa
DF	Airton Pavilhão
DF	Raul Calvet
DF	Ortunho
MF	Mengálvio	Substituted off
MF	Élton
MF	Milton Kuelle
FW	Marino	Substituted off
FW	Juarez
FW	Alfeu
Substitutes:
MF	Kim	Substituted in
FW	Ivo Diogo	Substituted in
Manager:
(Brazil) Oswaldo Rolla

GK	Osvaldo Ayala
DF	Rubén Navarro
DF	Silvio Marzolini
MF	Carlos Álvarez
MF	José Varacka
MF	Héctor Pederzoli
FW	Walter Jiménez
FW	Eugenio Callá	(substituted off) 46'
FW	Raúl Belén
FW	Ramón Abeledo	(substituted off) 62'
FW	Osvaldo Nardiello	(substituted off) 80'
Substitutes:
MF	Edgardo D'Ascenzo	(substituted in) 46'
FW	Ermindo Onega	(substituted in) 62'
MF	Lorenzo Dacquarti	(substituted in) 80'
Manager:
(Argentina) Guillermo Stábile

1960 Panamerican Championship

Argentina
1st title

== Awards ==
=== Top goalscorers ===
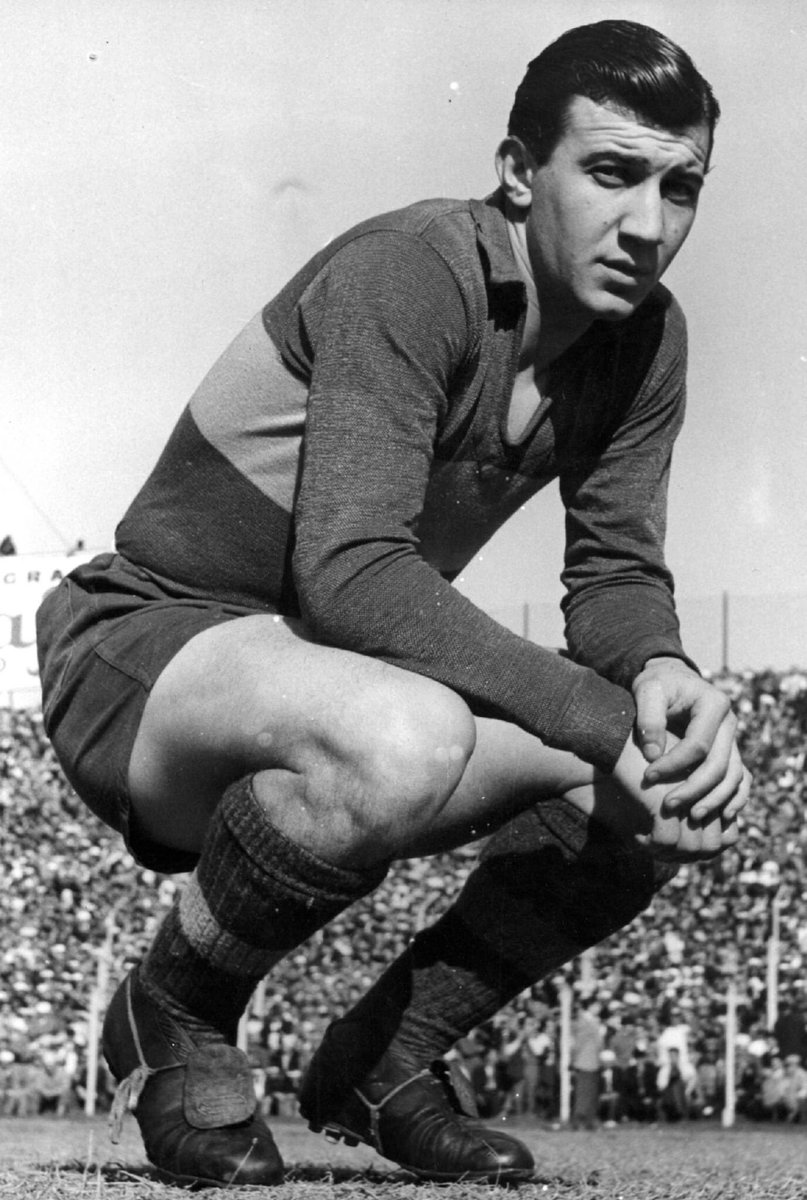
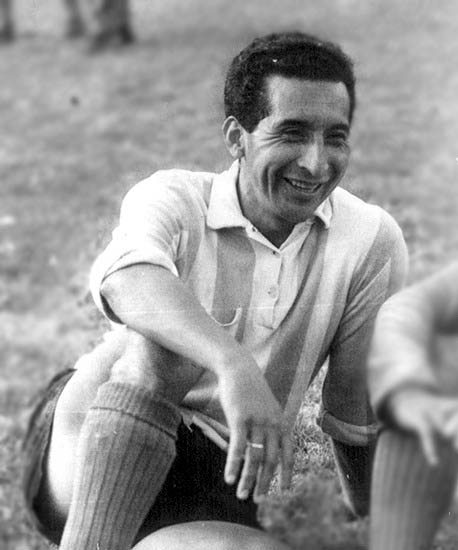
Argentine players Osvaldo Nardiello (left) and Raúl Belén, two of the top scorers of the competition with 3 goals

There were 32 goals scored in 12 matches, for an average of 2.67 goals per match.

3 goals

- (Argentina) Osvaldo Nardiello
- (Argentina) Raúl Belén
- (Brazil) Elton
- (Brazil) Juarez
- (Mexico) Sigifredo Mercado

2 goals

- (Mexico) Carlos González

Source: RSSSF

=== Team of the Tournament ===
Ideal XI by RSSSF
Goalkeeper	Defenders	Midfielders	Forwards
(Costa Rica) Hernán Alvarado	(Brazil) Airton Pavilhão (Argentina) Rubén Navarro	(Argentina) José Varacka (Costa Rica) Marvin Rodríguez (Mexico) Alfredo del Águila	(Costa Rica) Guillermo Valenciano (Brazil) Élton Fensterseifer (Brazil) Juarez Teixeira (Argentina) Raúl Belén (Mexico) Sigifredo Mercado
