= Marino (footballer, born 1939) =

Brazilian footballer

Personal information
- Full name: Marino da Silva
- Date of birth: 21 March 1939
- Place of birth: São Leopoldo, Brazil
- Date of death: 26 September 2001 (aged 62)
- Place of death: São Leopoldo, Brazil
- Position: Right winger

Youth career
- Aimoré

Senior career*
Years	Team	Apps	(Gls)
1956–1959	Aimoré		
1960–1964	Grêmio	248	(117)
1965–1966	Cerro		
1966–1967	Esportivo		
1967–1968	Internacional		

International career
1960	Brazil	6	(0)
- * Club domestic league appearances and goals as of 9 February 2024

Marino da Silva (21 March 1939 – 26 September 2001) was a Brazilian professional footballer who played as a right winger.

== Career ==
Having started his career at Aimoré in his hometown, Marino became famous at Grêmio, where he made 248 appearances and scored 117 goals. A fast winger, he often jokes: "I'm not Garrincha, but I know how to harass an opposing defense." On 1 May 1963, he scored four goals against SC Internacional. He also scored a goal from midfield line against Lev Yashin, excusing Grêmio in Europe in 1962.

Marino also made 4 appearances for the Brazil national team in total, during the 1960 Panamerican Championship.

== Honours ==
Grêmio

- Campeonato Gaúcho:1960, 1962, 1964
- Campeonato Sul-Brasileiro: 1962
- Campeonato Citadino de Porto Alegre: 1960, 1964
