= José Varacka =

Argentine footballer and coach

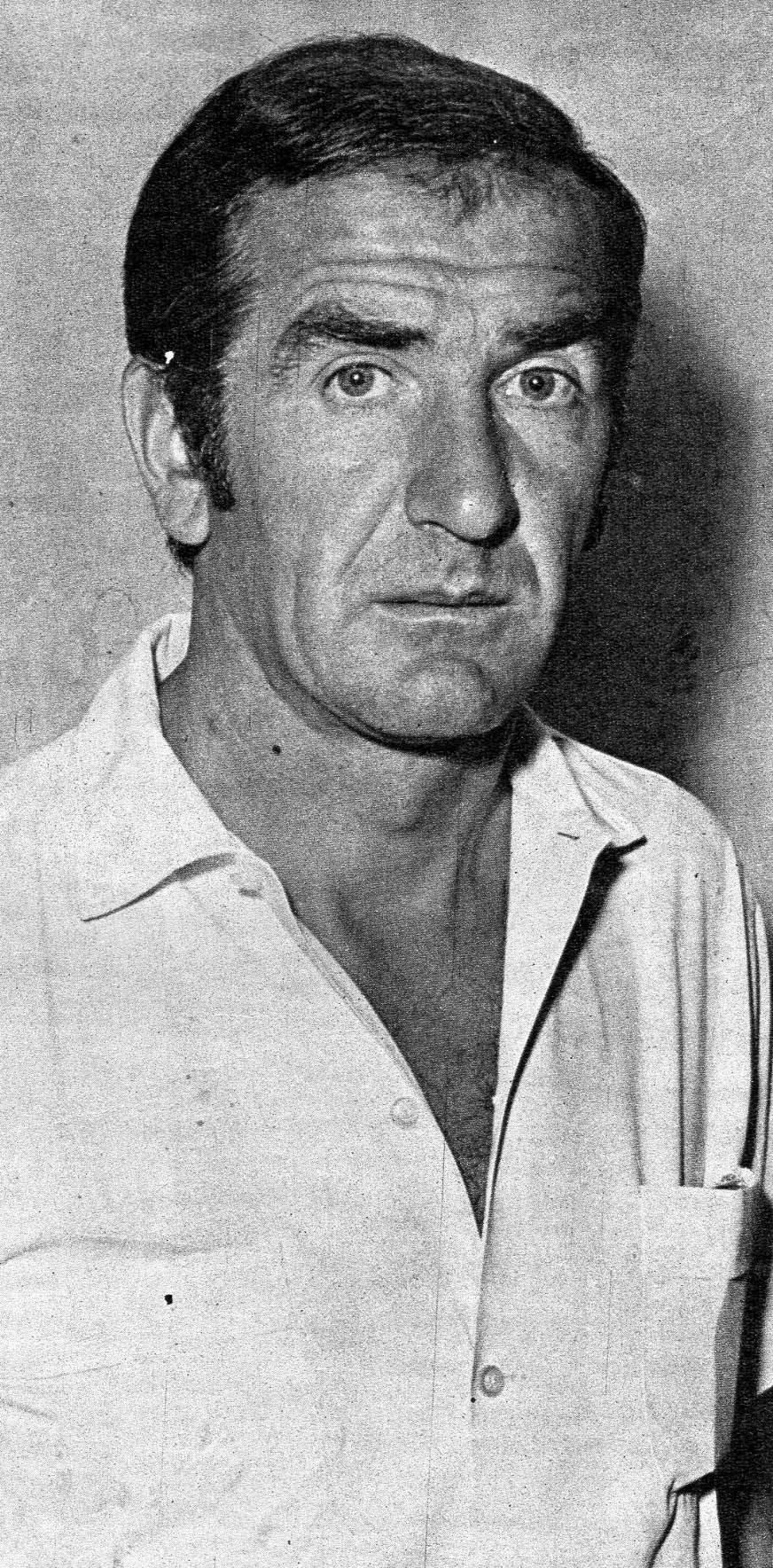
- Varacka in 1969

Personal information
- Date of birth: 27 May 1932
- Place of birth: Buenos Aires, Argentina
- Date of death: 22 October 2018 (aged 86)
- Height: 1.82 m (6 ft 0 in)
- Position: Midfielder

Senior career*
Years	Team	Apps	(Gls)
1952–1960	Independiente	202	(2)
1960–1965	River Plate	146	(1)
1966	San Lorenzo	17	(0)
1967	Porvenir Miraflores		
1968	Colo-Colo		

International career
1956–1966	Argentina	28	(0)

Managerial career
- 1968–1971: Gimnasia LP
- 1972: Boca Juniors
- 1973–1974: Gimnasia LP
- 1975: Atlanta
- 1975–1977: Atlético Junior
- 1978–1979: Gimnasia LP
- 1979: Millonarios
- 1980–1981: Atlético Junior
- 1981–1983: Argentinos Juniors
- 1983: River Plate
- 1984: Atlético Junior
- 1987–1988: Atlético Junior
- * Club domestic league appearances and goals as of November 2008

José Varacka (27 May 1932 – 22 October 2018) was an Argentine football player and coach.

== Club career ==
A midfielder, Varacka played for three of the big five teams in Argentina. He started his career in 1952 with Independiente. In 1954 he played and scored in a famous 6–0 win over Real Madrid. He joined River Plate in 1960 where he played for six seasons.

In 1966 Varacka joined San Lorenzo de Almagro and after one season with the club he would down his career at Colo-Colo in Chile and then Miraflores in Peru.

== International career ==
Varacka played in the 1958 and 1966 editions of the FIFA World Cup. He played in the Copa América 1956 and 1959. He was also part of the Argentina national team that won the 1964 Copa de Las Naciones, played in Brazil.

== Managerial career ==
Varacka started his managerial career with Gimnasia y Esgrima de La Plata in 1968. He went on to serve as the manager of Boca Juniors and River Plate. He won two Colombian league titles during his four spells as manager of Atlético Junior (1977 and 1980). In 1981 his Argentinos Juniors team dramatically avoided relegation on the last day of the season by beating his former team San Lorenzo 1–0, causing their relegation instead. Varacka also managed the Argentina national team in the 1974 world cup alongside Vladislao Cap.

== Honours ==
=== Player ===
Argentina

- Copa América: 1959
- Panamerican Championship: 1960
- Taça das Nações: 1964

=== Manager ===
Atlético Junior

- Categoría Primera A: 1977, 1980
