= Kim (footballer, born 1933) =

Brazilian footballer

Personal information
- Full name: Alcy Martha de Freitas
- Date of birth: 31 January 1933 (age 93)
- Place of birth: Montenegro, Brazil
- Height: 1.85 m (6 ft 1 in)
- Position: Midfielder

Senior career*
Years	Team	Apps	(Gls)
1953–1958	Aimoré		
1958–1963	Internacional		
1963–1965	Rio Grande		

International career
1960	Brazil	1	(0)
- * Club domestic league appearances and goals as of 15 February 2024

Alcy Martha de Freitas (born 31 January 1933), better known as Kim, is a Brazilian former professional footballer who played as a midfielder.

== Career ==
A player with good stature, Kim stood out for his excellent ability to land balls, as well as his long strides and elasticity in tackles. He began his career at Aimoré and later played for SC Internacional from 1958 to 1963, becoming champion in 1961. He ended his career at SC Rio Grande in 1965, after suffering from a detached retina.

Kime also made 1 appearances for the Brazil national team in total, during the 1960 Panamerican Championship.

== Personal life ==
Kim is brother os also footballers Alcindo and Alceu, father of Alzio, and uncle of Cláudio Freitas.

== Honours ==
Internacional

- Campeonato Gaúcho: 1961
