= Ermindo Onega =

Argentine footballer (1940–79)

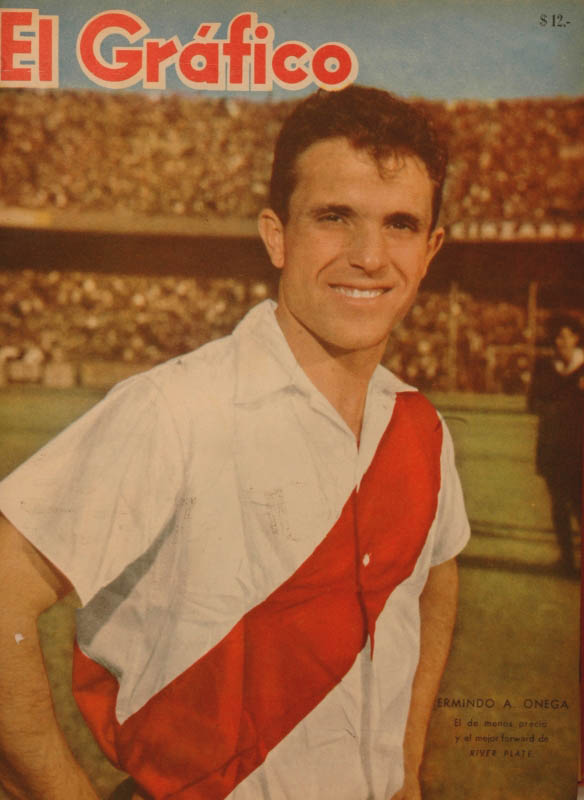
- Onega in 1961

Personal information
- Full name: Ermindo Ángel Onega
- Date of birth: April 30, 1940
- Place of birth: Las Parejas, Santa Fe, Argentina
- Date of death: December 21, 1979 (aged 39)
- Position: Attacking midfielder

Senior career*
Years	Team	Apps	(Gls)
1957–1968	River Plate	222	(98)
1969–1971	Peñarol	74	(22)
1972	Vélez Sársfield	30	(6)
1975–1977	Deportes La Serena	71	(17)
Total		397	(143)

International career
1960–1967	Argentina	30	(11)
- * Club domestic league appearances and goals

Ermindo Ángel Onega (30 April 1940 – 21 December 1979) was an Argentine footballer, attacking midfielder and forward from River Plate. He played for River Plate from 1957 to 1968, scoring 98 goals in 222 matches. In 1972, he played for Club Atlético Vélez Sársfield, scoring 6 goals in 30 matches.

Onega also had spells with Peñarol in Uruguay and La Serena in Chile. He was the older brother of Daniel Onega, also a River Plate footballer.

Onega died in a road accident in 1979 on his way to the city of Rosario. He was only 39 years old.

== Honours ==
River Plate

- Argentine Primera División: 1957; runner-up: 1960, 1962, 1963, 1965, 1966, 1968 Nacional
- Copa Libertadores Runner-up: 1966

Peñarol

- Intercontinental Champions' Supercup: 1969
- Uruguayan Primera División Runner-up: 1969, 1970, 1971
- Copa Libertadores Runner-up: 1970

Argentina

- Panamerican Championship: 1960
- Taça das Nações: 1964
