= Chinesinho =

Brazilian footballer (1935–2011)

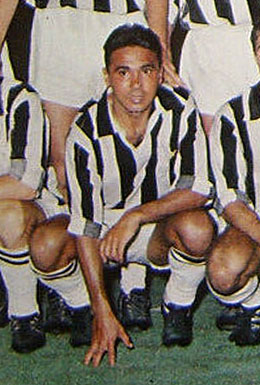
- Chinesinho at Juventus in 1965

Personal information
- Full name: Sidney Colônia Cunha
- Date of birth: 28 June 1935
- Place of birth: Rio Grande, Brazil
- Date of death: 16 April 2011 (aged 75)
- Position: Midfielder

Senior career*
Years	Team	Apps	(Gls)
1954	Renner	41	(1)
1955–1958	Internacional	74	(6)
1958–1962	Palmeiras	241	(55)
1962–1963	Modena	20	(3)
1963–1965	Catania	59	(5)
1965–1967	Juventus	85	(8)
1967–1972	Lanerossi Vicenza	90	(10)
1972	New York Cosmos	1	(0)
1973–1974	Nacional-SP	?	(?)

International career
1956–1961	Brazil	17	(7)

Managerial career
- 1976: Vicenza
- 1978–1979: Foggia
- 1979–1981: Forlì
- 1985: Palmeiras
- * Club domestic league appearances and goals

Sidney Colônia Cunha (28 June 1935 – 16 April 2011), commonly known as Chinesinho (Little Chinese), was a Brazilian footballer who played professionally, at both club and international levels, as a midfielder.

== Career ==
Born in Rio Grande, Chinesinho played for Renner, Internacional and Palmeiras in Brazil, before moving to Italy to play for Modena Football Club, Catania, Juventus and Lanerossi Vicenza, and in the United States for the New York Cosmos.

At international level, he made 17 appearances for Brazil between 1956 and 1961, scoring seven goals; he was a member of the team that finished in second place at the 1959 South American Championship.

== Honours ==
=== Club ===
Internacional

- Campeonato Gaúcho: 1955

Palmeiras

- Campeonato Paulista: 1959
- Campeonato Brasileiro Série A: 1960
- Copa Libertadores Runner-up: 1961

Catania

- Coppa delle Alpi Runner-up: 1964

Juventus

- Serie A: 1966–67

=== International ===
Brazil

- Panamerican Championship: 1956
- Copa América Runner-up: 1959
