= Élton Fensterseifer =

Brazilian footballer

Élton
Personal information
- Full name: Élton Fensterseifer
- Date of birth: 30 September 1937
- Place of birth: Roca Sales, Brazil
- Date of death: 22 December 2010 (aged 73)
- Place of death: Porto Alegre, Brazil
- Position: Defensive midfielder

Youth career
- SC Concórdia (Roca Sales)

Senior career*
| Years | Team | Apps | (Gls) |
| 1956–1963 | Grêmio | 326 | (80) |
| 1963–1966 | Botafogo | | |
| 1966–1969 | Internacional | | |

International career
| 1960 | Brazil | 6 | (3) |
- * Club domestic league appearances and goals as of 9 February 2024

Élton Fensterseifer (30 September 1937 – 23 December 2010), was a Brazilian professional footballer who played as a defensive midfielder.

== Career ==
Graduated from SC Concórdia de Roca Sales, his hometown, he was taken to Grêmio at the end of 1955 and was very pleased with the tests. In 1956, integrated into the main team, he was champion of the city and state, winning his fifth consecutive championship. He also had successful spells at Botafogo, where he won the Rio-São Paulo Tournament twice, and at Internacional, champion in 1969 and runner-up in the 1968 Torneio Roberto Gomes Pedrosa.

Élton also made 6 appearances for the Brazil national team and scored 3 goals in total, during the 1960 Panamerican Championship.

== Personal life ==
Élton entered political life after retiring in Rio Grande do Sul as a state deputy from 1971 to 1979.

== Honours ==
Grêmio

- Campeonato Gaúcho: 1956, 1957, 1958, 1959, 1960, 1962
- Campeonato Sul-Brasileiro: 1962
- Campeonato Citadino de Porto Alegre: 1956, 1957, 1958, 1959, 1960

Botafogo

- Torneio Rio-São Paulo: 1964, 1966

Internacional

- Campeonato Gaúcho: 1969

Individual

- Prêmio Belfort Duarte: 1970

== Death ==
Élton Fensterseifer died of a heart attack on 22 December 2010 in Porto Alegre.
