= Carlos Guerini =

Argentinian footballer (1949–2023)

Personal information
- Full name: Carlos Alfredo Guerini Lacasia
- Date of birth: 10 March 1949
- Place of birth: Córdoba, Argentina
- Date of death: 24 October 2023 (aged 74)
- Place of death: Spain
- Height: 1.77 m (5 ft 10 in)
- Position: Forward

Senior career*
Years	Team	Apps	(Gls)
- General Paz Juniors
- Rosario Puerto Belgrano
- Belgrano
- Boca Juniors
1973–1975	Málaga	41	(7)
1975–1979	Real Madrid	67	(11)
- Talleres
- Belgrano
Total		108+	(18+)
- * Club domestic league appearances and goals

Carlos Alfredo Guerini Lacasia (10 March 1949 – 24 October 2023) was an Argentine professional footballer who played as a forward.

== Career ==
Born in Córdoba, Guerini began his career with General Paz Juniors in 1966, later playing for Rosario Puerto Belgrano, Belgrano, Boca Juniors, Málaga, Real Madrid and Talleres.

== Death ==
Guerini died in Spain on 24 October 2023, where he was visiting his children, aged 74.
