= Suly =

Brazilian footballer

Personal information
- Full name: Suly Cabral Machado
- Date of birth: 29 December 1938 (age 87)
- Place of birth: Pelotas, Brazil
- Position: Goalkeeper

Senior career*
Years	Team	Apps	(Gls)
1952–1957	Brasil de Pelotas		
1954	→ Aimoré (loan)		
1960	Grêmio	35	(0)
1961–1968	São Paulo	266	(0)
1966	→ Botafogo-SP (loan)		
1973	Brasil de Pelotas		

International career
1960	Brazil	1	(0)
- * Club domestic league appearances and goals as of 30 August 2023

Suly Cabral Machado (born 29 December 1938), simply known as Suly (and sometimes referred as Suli), is a Brazilian former professional footballer who played as a goalkeeper.

== Career ==
Suly started his career in Brasil de Pelotas, and arrived at Grêmio in 1960, when he was called up to the 1960 Panamerican Championship. Afterwards, he transferred to São Paulo FC where he was the main goalkeeper for most of the 1960s.

Suly conceded the 500th goal of Pelé's career.

== Personal life ==
After retiring from football, he graduated in veterinary medicine and worked in the profession.

== Honours ==
=== Grêmio ===
- Campeonato Gaúcho: 1960
- Campeonato Citadino de Porto Alegre: 1960
