= Raúl Belén =

Argentine footballer (1931–2010)

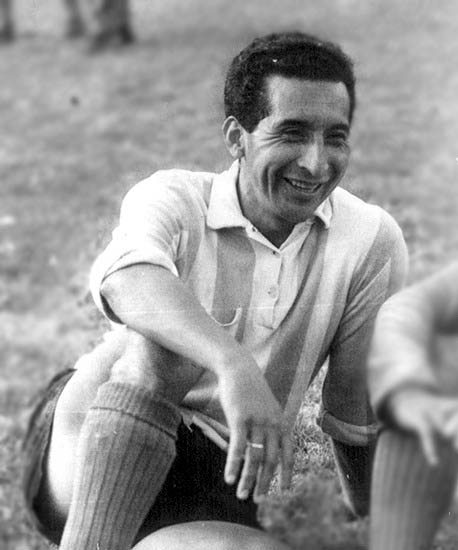

Personal information
- Full name: Raúl Oscar Belén
- Date of birth: 1 July 1931
- Place of birth: Argentina
- Date of death: 22 August 2010 (aged 79)
- Position: Left winger

Senior career*
Years	Team	Apps	(Gls)
1951–56	Newell's Old Boys		
1956–64	Racing		
1965–66	Newell's Old Boys		

International career
	Argentina	31	(8)
- * Club domestic league appearances and goals

Raúl Oscar Belén (1 July 1931 in Roldán, Santa Fe – 2 August 2010) was an Argentine football forward who played for Argentina in the 1962 FIFA World Cup. He also played for Racing Club de Avellaneda.

== Biography ==
Belén gave his first steps as a footballer in Newell's Old Boys, where he played from 1951 to 1956. Nevertheless, he is mostly known for his tenure at Racing Club de Avellaneda, where he played 174 matches scoring 42 goals. Belén's highlights with Newell were two goals v Rosario Central that helped his team to win both matches. Some of his teammates there were Jorge Griffa and José Yudica.

Belén was part of the first tours that teams outside Buenos Aires went to Europe, playing with Newell's in some friendly matches in the Netherlands and Luxembourg. After he suffered tuberculosis during one of those tours, Belén had to leave football for one year, but as his performances deceased due to the illness, Newell's executives decided to cancel his contract. As a result, he moved to Buenos Aires to play for Racing Club de Avellaneda.

Although Belén started playing as a midfielder, he gained recognition as a left-winger, after Racing Club coach José Della Torre moved him to that position, although he denied playing as a winger at the beginning. Because of his performance at the 1959 South American Championship, Belén was considered the best left-winger in the competition.

Belén had 31 caps for the Argentina national team, scoring 8 goals. He was part of the team at the two editions of 1959 Copa América (in Argentina and Ecuador, where he was champion and runner-up, respectively). Belén also won the 1960 Panamerican Championship, being also one of the top scorers of Argentina along with Osvaldo Nardiello. Belén was part of the team that participated in the 1962 FIFA World Cup in Chile.

== Titles ==
Racing

- Primera División (2): 1958, 1961

Argentina

- Copa América (1): 1959 (A)
- Panamerican Championship (1): 1960
