= Ivo Diogo =

Brazilian footballer (1935-2009)

Ivo Lul Diogo, better known as Ivo Diogo (January 12, 1935 in São Borja, Rio Grande do Sul – July 7, 2009 in Porto Alegre), was a Brazilian football (soccer) player, who played as a midfielder. He made four appearances for the Brazil national team in 1960.

== Clubs ==
- Internacional: 1955 - 1960
- Newells Old Boys: 1961
- Grêmio: 1962
- San Lorenzo: 1963 - 1964

== Honours ==
- Campeonato Gaúcho: 1955, 1961.
