= Silvio Marzolini =

Argentine footballer (1940–2020)

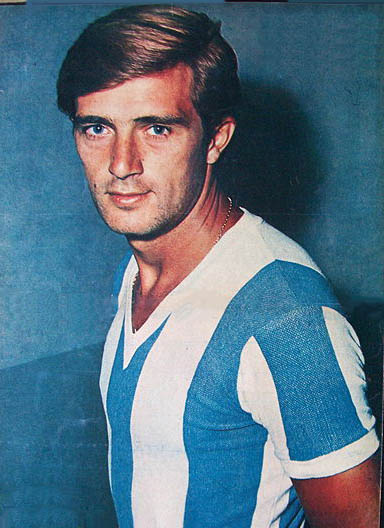
- Marzolini with Argentina, c. 1966

Personal information
- Date of birth: 4 October 1940
- Place of birth: Buenos Aires, Argentina
- Date of death: 17 July 2020 (aged 79)
- Place of death: Buenos Aires, Argentina
- Height: 1.83 m (6 ft 0 in)
- Position: Left-back

Senior career*
Years	Team	Apps	(Gls)
1959	Ferro Carril Oeste	53	(0)
1960–1972	Boca Juniors	387	(10)
Total		440	(10)

International career
1960–1969	Argentina	28	(1)

Managerial career
- 1975–1976: All Boys
- 1981: Boca Juniors
- 1995–1996: Boca Juniors
- * Club domestic league appearances and goals

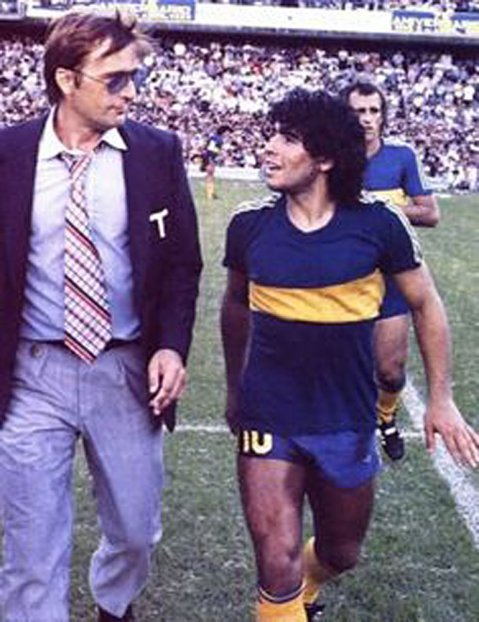
Marzolini (left) coached Diego Maradona in 1981

Silvio Marzolini (4 October 1940 – 17 July 2020) was an Argentine footballer who gained recognition during his tenure on Boca Juniors (1960–72). He is widely regarded as the best Argentine left-back of all time, playing that position for the Argentina national team in the 1962 FIFA World Cup and the 1966 FIFA World Cup, where he was elected as the best left back of that tournament. Marzolini played a total of 28 games for Argentina.

== Playing career ==
Marzolini's first steps as footballer were in Deportivo Italiano, soon moving to the young divisions of Ferro Carril Oeste in 1955. After a discussion with the club managers asking to play in the senior team, Marzolini was suspended for two years. Nevertheless, he debuted in Primera División in May 1959, playing against Boca Juniors, that would hire him the following year.

Marzolini debuted with Boca on 3 April 1960 against Estudiantes de La Plata, defeating it by 2–1. Boca finished third at the end of the season, with Marzolini playing all of the games.

In 1961 Marzolini scored his first goal in the top division, but Boca did not have a great campaign, finishing fifth. Marzolini played a total of 29 games scoring 2 goals. The first achievement came in 1962 when Boca won the title, with notable players such as goalkeeper Antonio Roma, Brazilian striker Paulo Valentim and Norberto Menéndez. Boca finished first with 42 points. Marzolini was also the most capped player of the season with 28 games played.

Marzolini was named as left-back in the 1966 FIFA World Cup team of the tournament while Argentina was eliminated at the quarter final stage.

== Managerial career ==
After retiring as a player, Marzolini became manager of All Boys where he stayed from 1975 to 1976. In 1981 Marzolini returned to Boca Juniors, with which he won the 1981 Metropolitano with superstar Diego Maradona as the outstanding player of the team. Other notable players for Boca were Miguel Brindisi, goalkeeper Hugo Gatti and defender Oscar Ruggeri.

== Legacy ==
In a 2007 interview with FourFourTwo magazine, English great Bobby Charlton named him in his dream eleven, describing him as a player who "wasn’t that fast, but his positioning was so good he didn’t need to be", and that he had "such good control that it gave him time and space to play the ball away safely".

== Personal life and death ==
Marzolini suffered a stroke in 2019 and was later diagnosed with cancer. He died on 17 July 2020, at the age of 79.

His grandson Facundo Lescano, son of his daughter Maria Marta, is a footballer, currently playing in Italy for U.S. Salernitana 1919.

== Honours ==
=== Player ===
Boca Juniors

- Primera División: 1962, 1964, 1965, 1969 Nacional, 1970 Nacional
- Copa Argentina: 1969
- Copa Libertadores runner-up: 1963

Argentina

- Panamerican Championship: 1960
- Copa América runner-up: 1967

Individual

- FIFA World Cup All-Star Team: 1966
- IFFHS Argentina All Times Dream Team: 2021

=== Manager ===
Boca Juniors

- Primera División: 1981 Metropolitano
