= Ramón Abeledo =

Argentine footballer (born 1937)

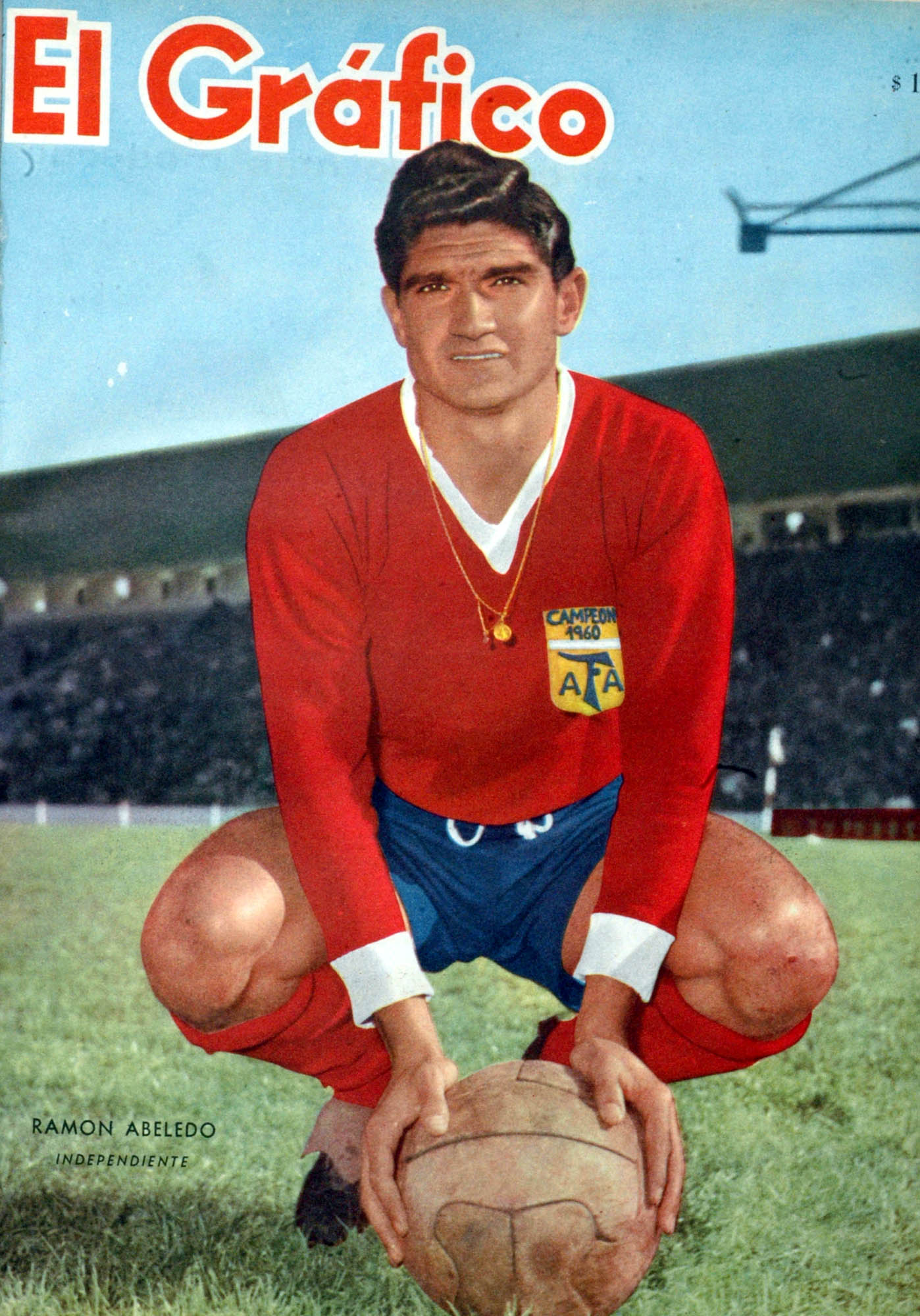

Personal information
- Full name: Ramón Gregorio Abeledo
- Date of birth: 19 April 1937 (age 89)
- Place of birth: Argentina
- Height: 1.69 m (5 ft 7 in)
- Position: Midfielder

Senior career*
Years	Team	Apps	(Gls)
1955–1962	Independiente	87	(30)
1964	Boca Juniors	2	(0)
1964	Peñarol	?	(?)

International career
1962–1963	Argentina	7	(0)
- * Club domestic league appearances and goals

Ramón Gregorio Abeledo (born 29 April 1937) is an Argentine football midfielder who played for Argentina in the 1962 FIFA World Cup. He also played for Club Atlético Independiente.
