= Walter Jiménez (footballer, born 1939) =

Argentine footballer (1939–2023)

Walter Antonio Jiménez De Simoni
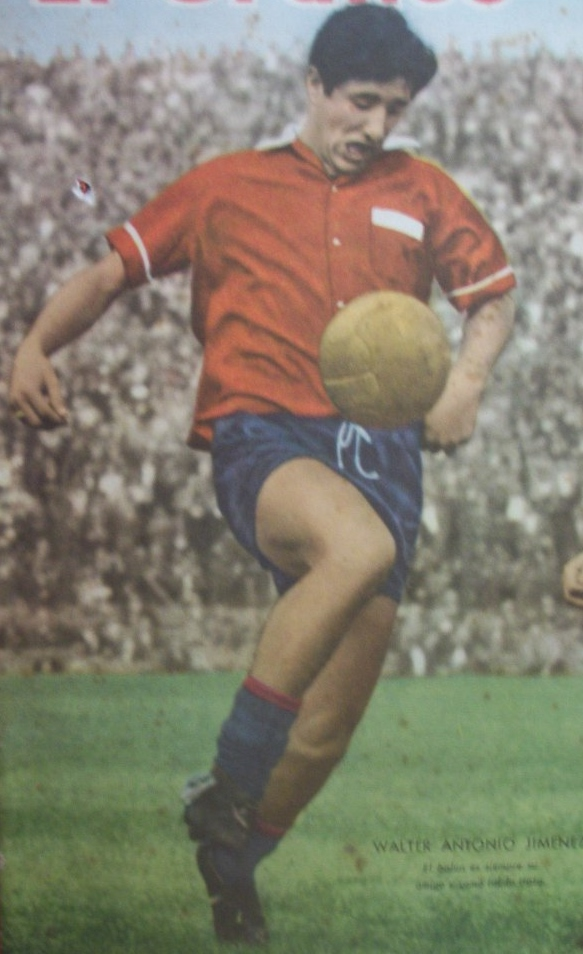

Personal information
- Full name: Walter Antonio Jiménez De Simoni
- Date of birth: 25 May 1939
- Place of birth: Argentina
- Date of death: 19 January 2023 (aged 83)
- Position: Forward

Senior career*
Years	Team	Apps	(Gls)
1955–1962	Independiente		
1963–1966	Colo-Colo		
1967	Audax Italiano		
1968	Deportes Concepción		
1969	Palestino		
1970–1971	Audax Italiano		

International career
1962	Argentina		
- * Club domestic league appearances and goals

Walter Antonio Jiménez De Simoni (25 May 1939 – 19 January 2023) was an Argentine footballer who played as a forward for clubs of Argentina and Chile and the Argentina national team in the 1962 FIFA World Cup qualification.

== Career ==
- Independiente 1955–1962
- Colo-Colo 1963–1966
- Audax Italiano 1967
- Deportes Concepción 1968
- Palestino 1969
- Audax Italiano 1970–1971

== Honours ==
Independiente

- Argentine Primera División: 1960

Colo-Colo

- Chilean Primera División: 1963

Argentina

- Panamerican Championship: 1960
