= Gilberto Andrade =

Brazilian footballer (1937–2000)

Personal information
- Full name: Gilberto Garcia Andrade
- Date of birth: 9 November 1937
- Place of birth: Porto Alegre, Brazil
- Date of death: 9 October 2000 (aged 62)
- Place of death: Porto Alegre, Brazil
- Position: Forward

Senior career*
Years	Team	Apps	(Gls)
1956–1961	Aimoré		
1962	Internacional		
1963–1964	Portuguesa		
1964–1965	Internacional		
1966	Flamengo-RS		
1967	Grêmio		
1968	Perdigão		
1969–1970	São José-RS		

International career
1960	Brazil	2	(1)
- * Club domestic league appearances and goals as of 12 February 2024

Gilberto Garcia Andrade (9 November 1937 – 9 October 2000), also known as Gilberto or Gilberto Andrade, was a Brazilian professional footballer who played as a forward.

== Career ==
Gilberto Andrade began his career at Aimoré, where he played with other great players such as Suly and Mengálvio, with whom he was called up to the Brazil national team. Afterwards he played for Internacional, Portuguesa, Grêmio, SER Caxias and EC São José.

Andrade also made 2 appearances for the Brazil national team in total, and scored one goal, during the 1960 Panamerican Championship.
