= Orlando Rosa (footballer) =

Brazilian footballer (1932–2011)

Personal information
- Full name: Orlando Rosa Romagna
- Date of birth: 29 February 1932
- Place of birth: Júlio de Castilhos, Brazil
- Date of death: 23 May 2011 (aged 79)
- Place of death: Porto Alegre, Brazil
- Position: Defender

Youth career
- 1947–1950: Grêmio

Senior career*
| Years | Team | Apps | (Gls) |
| 1950–1953 | Grêmio | | |
| 1953–1958 | Renner | | |
| 1958–1961 | Grêmio | | |
| 1961–1962 | Flamengo-RS | | |
| 1962 | São José-RS | | |
| 1963 | Esperança-RS | | |

International career
| 1960 | Brazil | 5 | (0) |
- * Club domestic league appearances and goals

Orlando Rosa Romagna (29 February 1932 – 23 May 2011), better known as Orlando Rosa, was a Brazilian professional footballer who played as a defender.

== Career ==
Trained in the youth sectors of Grêmio, he played at the club until 1953, especially in the aspirants, when he was taken to GE Renner for the 1954 season. Predestined, he was part of the squad in the only achievement in the club's history, impressing with the precision of his tackles, with a lot of technique, clashing with other defenders of Rio Grande do Sul football at the time. He returned to Grêmio for a new spell, this time victorious, with three more state titles and 147 appearances. He would still play for GE Flamengo (currently SER Caxias), São José and Esperança de Novo Hamburgo.

Orlando Rosa also made five appearances for the Brazil national team during the 1960 Panamerican Championship.

== Honours ==
Renner

- Campeonato Gaúcho: 1954
- Campeonato Citadino de Porto Alegre: 1954

Grêmio

- Campeonato Gaúcho: 1958, 1959, 1960,
- Campeonato Citadino de Porto Alegre: 1958, 1959, 1960
