= Airton Pavilhão =

Brazilian footballer (1934-2012)

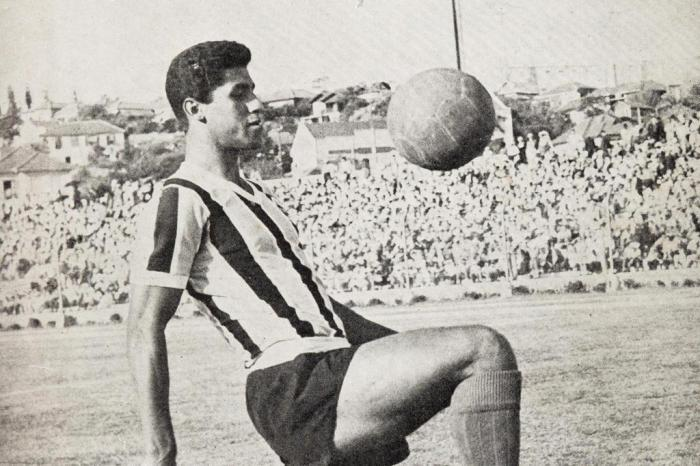

Airton Ferreira da Silva, best known as Airton Pavilhão (31 October 1934 – 3 April 2012) was an association football defender.

Pavilhão was born and died in Porto Alegre, Brazil. In the course of his career (1949–1971), he played for Força e Luz, Grêmio, Santos and Cruz Alta Rio Grande do Sul. He won eleven Campeonato Gaúcho with Grêmio (from 1956 to 1960 and from 1962 to 1967). He made six appearances for the Brazil national team in 1960.
