= Osvaldo Nardiello =

Argentine footballer (1936–2020)

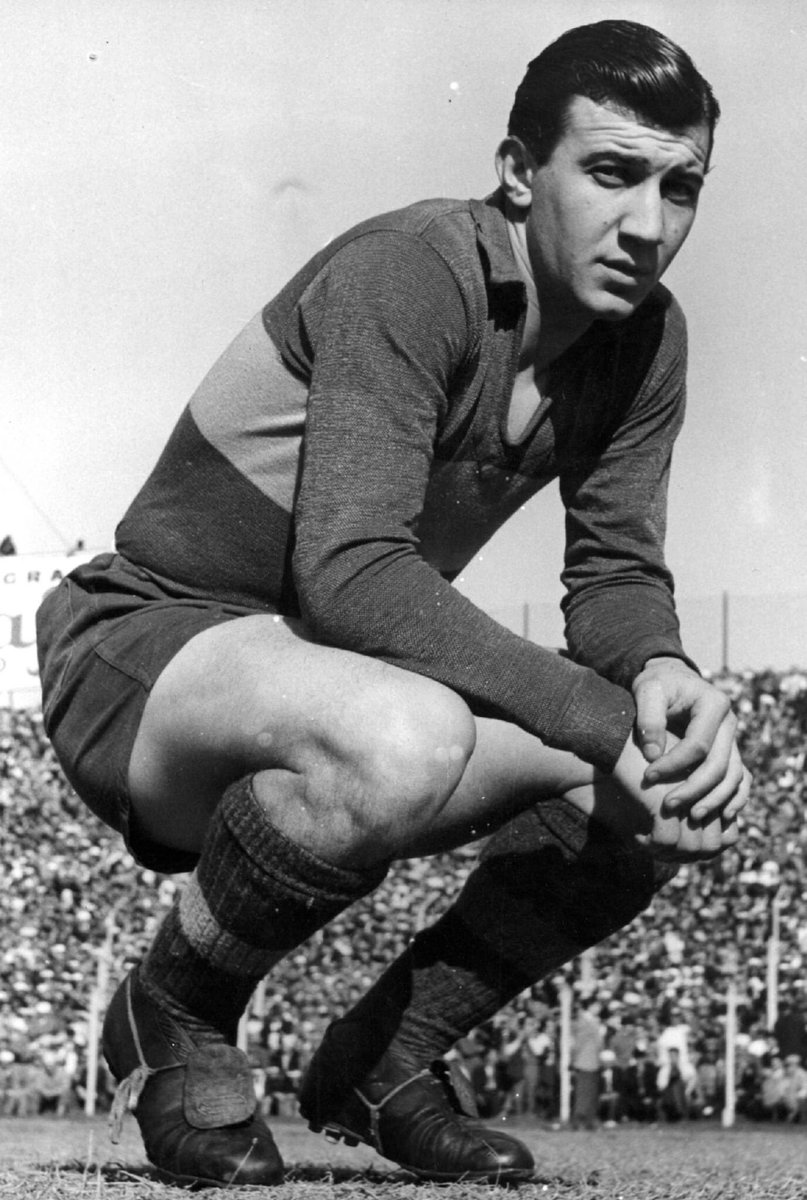
- Nardiello with Boca Juniors

Personal information
- Full name: Ángel Osvaldo Nardiello
- Date of birth: 31 August 1936
- Date of death: 26 May 2020 (aged 83)

Senior career*
Years	Team	Apps	(Gls)
1955–57	Newell's Old Boys	56	(12)
1958–62	Boca Juniors	107	(44)
1963–65	Estudiantes LP	40	(9)
1965–66	Chacarita Juniors	27	(6)
1967	San Lorenzo (MdP)	10	(0)

International career
1959–1962	Argentina	11	(3)
- * Club domestic league appearances and goals

Ángel Osvaldo Nardiello (Rosario, Santa Fe, 31 August 1936 – 26 May 2020) was an Argentine footballer that played as right winger.

He played in eleven matches for the Argentina national football team from 1959 to 1962. He was also part of Argentina's squad for the 1959 South American Championship that took place in Argentina.

== Biography ==
A native of Rosario, Santa Fe, Nardiello debuted with Newell's Old Boys in 1955, playing there until 1957. Nicknamed Motoneta because of his speed, Nardiello would be soon called up to play with the Argentina national team

Nardiello then moved to Boca Juniors, where he debuted in July 1958. He was part of the team that won the 1962 Argentine Primera División championship after eight seasons without titles. Some of Nardiello's teammates in Boca Juniors were Antonio Roma, Silvio Marzolini, Antonio Rattín, Juan José Pizzuti, and Brazilian forwards Paulo Valentim, Mauro Rapahel (Maurinho), and Almir Moraes Albuquerque. He stayed in Boca Juniors for two years, playing 29 matches with 21 goals scored in Primera División.

After his tenure on Boca Juniors, Nardiello then played for Estudiantes de La Plata, Chacarita Juniors, and San Lorenzo de Mar del Plata. In local football, he played a total of 240 matches scoring 71 goals. In the Argentina national team, Nardiello played 12 matches scoring five goals, three of them to Brazil.

Nardiello was also famous for his addition to tobacco, he died after being six days in a coma. He had been an emergency operation due to a peritonitis.

== Titles ==
Boca Juniors

- Primera División (1): 1962

Argentina

- Copa América (1): 1959 (A)
- Panamerican Championship (1): 1960
