= Alfeu (footballer) =

Brazilian footballer (born 1936)

Alfeu Martha de Freitas
Personal information
- Full name: Alfeu Martha de Freitas
- Date of birth: August 24, 1936
- Place of birth: Montenegro, Rio Grande do Sul, Brazil
- Position: Midfielder

Senior career*
Years	Team	Apps	(Gls)
1956–1957	Aimoré		
1958	Portuguesa		
1959–1962	Internacional		
1963–1964	San Lorenzo		
1964	Grêmio		

International career
1960	Brazil	5	(1)
- * Club domestic league appearances and goals

Alfeu Martha de Freitas (born August 24, 1936 in Montenegro, Rio Grande do Sul), known as just Alfeu, was a Brazilian football (soccer) player, who played as a midfielder and played in clubs of Brazil and Argentina. He made five appearances for the Brazil national team in 1960.

== Clubs ==
- Aimoré: 1956 - 1957
- Portuguesa: 1958 - 1958
- Internacional: 1959 - 1962
- San Lorenzo: 1963 - 1964
- Grêmio: 1964 - 1964

== Honours ==
- Campeonato Gaúcho: 1961.
