= Carlos González (footballer, born 1935) =

Mexican footballer

Personal information
- Full name: Carlos González Cabrera
- Date of birth: April 12, 1935
- Place of birth: La Piedad, Michoacán, Mexico
- Date of death: July 8, 2017 (aged 82)
- Position: Forward

Senior career*
Years	Team	Apps	(Gls)
- Club Atlas

International career
1956–1961	Mexico	10	(4)
- * Club domestic league appearances and goals

Carlos González Cabrera (12 April 1935 – 8 July 2017) was a Mexican football league forward.

== Career ==
He played for Mexico in the 1958 FIFA World Cup. He also played for Club Atlas.
