= 1962 Campeonato Sul-Brasileiro =

Tournament details
- Country: South Region, Brazil
- Dates: 21 January – 18 March
- Teams: 6

Final positions
- Champions: (Rio Grande do Sul) Grêmio
- Runners-up: (Santa Catarina (state)) Marcílio Dias

Tournament statistics
- Matches played: 30
- Goals scored: 86 (2.87 per match)

The Campeonato Sul-Brasileiro (English: Southern Brazil Championship), sometimes referred as Torneio da Legalidade, was a regional tournament organized in 1962 by the state federations of Paraná, Santa Catarina and Rio Grande do Sul. It was the first regional competition involving teams from the southern region.

== History ==
The competition was designed with the aim of rivaling the Torneio Rio-São Paulo. It was called the Torneio da Legalidade (English: Legality Tournament) as a way of defending the Brazilian constitution at the time, which provided for the inauguration of João Goulart, then vice president of Brazil, to assume the vacancy after the resignation of Jânio Quadros. At the time, there was a popular movement that yearned for new elections, contrary to what was stipulated by law.

== Participants ==
Team	Domestic league results
(Rio Grande do Sul) Internacional	1961 Campeonato Gaúcho champions
(Rio Grande do Sul) Grêmio	1961 Campeonato Gaúcho runners-up
(Paraná (state)) Operário Ferroviário	1961 Campeonato Paranaense runners-up
(Paraná (state)) Coritiba	Invited
(Santa Catarina (state)) Metropol	1961 Campeonato Catarinense champions
(Santa Catarina (state)) Marcílio Dias	1961 Campeonato Catarinense runners-up

Note
EC Comercial (Cornélio Procópio), the 1961 Campeonato Paranaense champions, withdrew from the dispute. Coritiba was invited in their place.

== Format ==
The competition was played in a round-robin format, where the team that scored the most points became champion.

== Final table ==
Pos	Team	Pld	W	D	L	GF	GA	GD	Pts
1	(Rio Grande do Sul) Grêmio (C)	10	7	3	0	18	4	+14	17
2	(Santa Catarina (state)) Marcílio Dias	10	4	4	2	15	13	+2	12
3	(Rio Grande do Sul) Internacional	10	4	3	3	19	11	+8	11
4	(Paraná (state)) Coritiba	10	3	2	5	12	15	−3	8
5	(Paraná (state)) Operário Ferroviário	10	3	1	6	10	18	−8	7
6	(Santa Catarina (state)) Metropol	10	1	3	6	12	25	−13	5

Source: RSSSF
Rules for classification: 1) points; 2) wins; 3) goal difference; 4) goals for.
(C) Champions

== Champion ==
Campeonato Sul-Brasileiro
(Rio Grande do Sul)
Grêmio
1st title
