= Panamerican Championship =

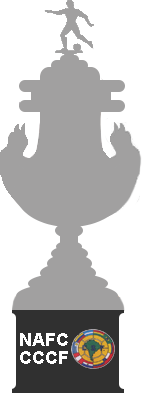
- Trophy given to champions
- Organiser(s): Panamerican Football Confederation (PFC)
- Founded: 1952; 74 years ago
- Abolished: 1960; 66 years ago
- Teams: 6 (1952–1956); 4 (1960)
- Related competitions: Copa América; CONCACAF Championship; Gold Cup
- Most championships: Brazil (2 titles)

The Panamerican Championship was an official continental competition of association football organized by the Panamerican Football Confederation (PFC) every four years for senior national teams, with three editions held from 1952 through 1960.

The competition was similar to the Copa América but included nations not only from the South American Football Confederation but also from the North American Football Confederation (NAFC) and the Confederación Centroamericana y del Caribe de Fútbol (CCCF) (which merged to form CONCACAF in 1961).

== History ==
The Panamerican Championship (Spanish: Campeonato Panamericano de Fútbol) and (Portuguese: Campeonato Panamericano de futebol) was an international football tournament founded in 1949 by the Panamerican Football Confederation. It was created to bring together the three football confederations of the Americas at the time: CONMEBOL, NAFC and CCCF. The tournament was held on three occasions, with Brazil winning the title twice and Argentina once. As an attempt to establish a championship for the entire Americas, the reigning champions of the NAFC Championship, the CCCF Championship, and the South American Championship (now the Copa América), together with the host nation, qualified automatically. The remaining places were filled by other member associations of the Panamerican Football Confederation.

=== Panamerican Football Confederation ===
Panamerican Football Confederation
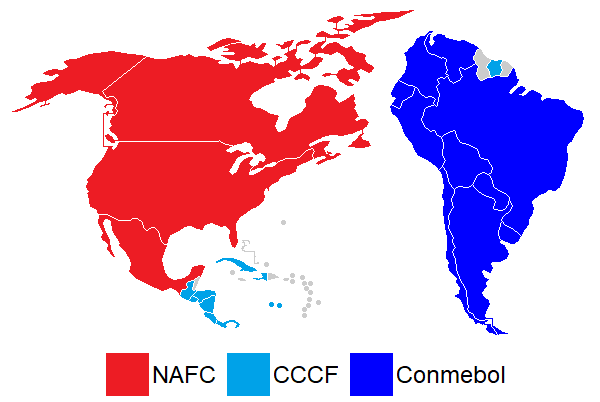
- Abbreviation: PFC
- Formation: 1946
- Dissolved: 1961
- Type: Football organization
- Members: 32 members associations

The Panamerican Football Confederation (PFC; Spanish: Confederación Panamericana de Fútbol; Portuguese: Confederação Panamericana de Futebol; French: Confédération Panaméricaine de football; Dutch: Panamerikaanse voetbalconfederatie) was an umbrella organisation established in 1946 to coordinate football between the existing continental confederations of the Americas. Its membership comprised the North American Football Confederation (NAFC), the Central American and Caribbean Football Confederation (CCCF) and the South American Football Confederation (CONMEBOL). The organisation ceased to exist in 1961 after CONMEBOL withdrew, while the NAFC and CCCF merged later that year to form CONCACAF.

== Results ==
Ed.	Year	Host city	(gold) Champions	(silver) Runners-up	(bronze) Third place	Fourth place
1	1952	Santiago, Chile	Brazil	Chile	Uruguay	Peru
2	1956	Mexico City, Mexico	Brazil	Argentina	Costa Rica	Peru
3	1960	San José, Costa Rica	Argentina	Brazil	Mexico	Costa Rica

== Performance by nation ==
Team	Champions	Runners-up	Third place	Appearances
Brazil	2	1	0	3 (1952, 1956, 1960)
Argentina	1	1	0	2 (1956, 1960)
Chile	0	1	0	2 (1952, 1956)
Costa Rica	0	0	1	2 (1956, 1960)
Mexico	0	0	1	3 (1952, 1956, 1960)
Uruguay	0	0	1	1 (1952)
Peru	0	0	0	2 (1952, 1956)
Panama	0	0	0	1 (1952)

== Record and statistics ==
=== All-time top scorers ===
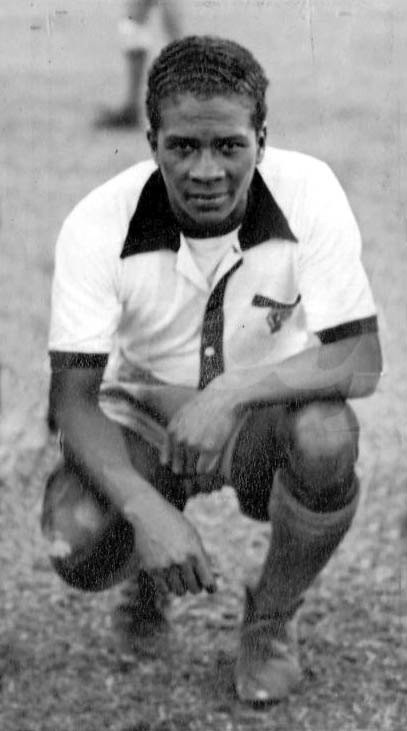
Valeriano López, all-time top scorer with 7 goals

Rank	Nat.	Player	Goals	Played
1	(Peru)	Valeriano López	7	5
2	(Chile)	Andrés Prieto	6	2
3	(Uruguay)	Oscar Míguez	5	5
3	(Argentina)	Omar Sívori	5	5
3	(Uruguay)	Julio Abbadie	5	5
4	(Brazil)	Chinesinho	4	3
4	(Mexico)	Carlos Septién	4	5
4	(Brazil)	Larry	4	5
4	(Brazil)	Baltazar	4	5
4	(Brazil)	Rodrigues Tatu	4	5
4	(Brazil)	Pinga	4	5
4	(Costa Rica)	Jorge Monge	4	5
5	(Argentina)	Humberto Maschio	3	4
5	(Argentina)	Osvaldo Nardiello	3	5
5	(Brazil)	Juarez	3	5
5	(Argentina)	Raúl Belén	3	6
5	(Mexico)	Sigifredo Mercado	3	6
5	(Brazil)	Elton	3	6

=== Winning Coaches ===
Edition	Coach
1952	(Brazil) Zezé Moreira
1956	(Brazil) Teté
1960	(Argentina) Guillermo Stábile

=== Overall team records ===
Rank	Team	Part	Pld	W	D	L	GF	GA	GD	Pts
1	Brazil	3	16	11	3	2	34	15	+19	25
2	Argentina	2	11	6	4	1	20	9	+11	16
3	Mexico	3	16	3	4	9	18	30	-12	10
4	Peru	2	10	3	3	4	20	16	+4	9
5	Chile	2	10	4	1	5	20	17	+3	9
6	Costa Rica	2	11	3	3	5	15	25	-10	9
7	Uruguay	1	5	3	0	2	16	10	+6	6
8	Panama	1	5	0	0	5	5	28	-23	0

=== Most goals in a match ===
The most goals in a single match was eight, on two occasions.

Goals	Winner	Score	Loser	Edition
8	Peru	7–1	Panama	(Chile) 1952
8	Brazil	7–1	Costa Rica	(Mexico) 1956
7	Chile	6–1	Panama	(Chile) 1952
7	Uruguay	6–1	Panama	(Chile) 1952
5	Brazil	5–0	Panama	(Chile) 1952

== See also ==
- CCCF Championship
- CONCACAF Gold Cup
- Copa América
- Copa América Centenario
- North American Nations Cup
- Afro-Asian Cup of Nations
- Finalissima
- AFC–OFC Challenge Cup
