= 1990 Campeonato Gaúcho =

Campeonato Gaúcho
- Season: 1990
- Champions: Grêmio
- Relegated: Aimoré; Novo Hamburgo
- Copa do Brasil: Grêmio; Caxias
- Série B: Juventude; Caxias
- Matches: 195
- Goals: 404 (2.07 per match)
- Top goalscorer: Nílson (Internacional) – 22 goals
- Biggest home win: Grêmio 6-0 Novo Hamburgo (March 24, 1990)
- Biggest away win: Lajeadense 0-4 Juventude (March 25, 1990); Aimoré 1-5 Grêmio (May 20, 1990)
- Highest scoring: Grêmio 6-0 Novo Hamburgo (March 24, 1990); Caxias 4-2 Grêmio (May 1, 1990); Pelotas 5-1 Lajeadense (May 9, 1990); Aimoré 1-5 Grêmio (May 20, 1990); Aimoré 4-2 Passo Fundo (June 3, 1990)

The 70th season of the Campeonato Gaúcho kicked off on February 4, 1990, and ended on July 29, 1990. Fourteen teams participated. Holders Grêmio won their 28th title. Aimoré and Novo Hamburgo were relegated.

== Participating teams ==
Club	Stadium	Home location	Previous season
Aimoré	Cristo-Rei	São Leopoldo	12th
Caxias	Centenário	Caxias do Sul	3rd
Esportivo	Montanha	Bento Gonçalves	8th
Glória	Altos da Glória	Vacaria	4th
Grêmio	Olímpico	Porto Alegre	1st
Guarany	Taba Índia	Cruz Alta	2nd (Second level)
Internacional	Beira-Rio	Porto Alegre	2nd
Juventude	Alfredo Jaconi	Caxias do Sul	7th
Lajeadense	Florestal	Lajeado	10th
Novo Hamburgo	Santa Rosa	Novo Hamburgo	9th
Passo Fundo	Vermelhão da Serra	Passo Fundo	6th
Pelotas	Boca do Lobo	Pelotas	5th
Santa Cruz	Plátanos	Santa Cruz do Sul	11th
Ypiranga	Colosso da Lagoa	Erechim	1st (Second level)

== System ==
The championship would have three stages:

- First phase: The fourteen teams played each other in a double round-robin system. The two best teams in each round qualified to the Final quadrangular. If the same teams qualified in both stages, the teams with the best overall record advanced. The team with the best record won one bonus point to the final quadrangular.
- Final quadrangular: The four remaining teams played each other in a double round-robin system; the team with the most points won the title.

== Championship ==
=== First phase ===
==== First round ====
Pos	Team	Pld	W	D	L	GF	GA	GD	Pts	Qualification or relegation
1	Grêmio	13	9	3	1	28	6	+22	21	Qualified
2	Internacional	13	7	5	1	15	4	+11	19	Qualified
3	Caxias	13	6	5	2	15	12	+3	17	
4	Juventude	13	5	5	3	16	12	+4	15	
5	Ypiranga de Erechim	13	5	3	5	19	17	+2	13	
6	Pelotas	13	4	5	4	13	12	+1	13	
7	Guarany de Cruz Alta	13	4	4	5	10	14	−4	12	
8	Esportivo	13	4	4	5	16	16	0	12	
9	Santa Cruz	13	2	7	4	12	15	−3	11	
10	Lajeadense	13	3	5	5	10	17	−7	11	
11	Passo Fundo	13	4	2	7	13	20	−7	10	
12	Novo Hamburgo	13	3	4	6	8	19	−11	10	
13	Glória	13	3	4	6	12	17	−5	10	
14	Aimoré	13	0	8	5	7	13	−6	8	

Updated to match(es) played on April 15, 1990. Source: RSSSF.com
Rules for classification: 1) points; 2) wins; 3) goal difference; 4) number of goals scored.

==== Second round ====
Pos	Team	Pld	W	D	L	GF	GA	GD	Pts	Qualification or relegation
1	Caxias	13	7	4	2	22	13	+9	18	Qualified
2	Grêmio	13	6	4	3	22	10	+12	16	Qualified
3	Pelotas	13	5	5	3	16	11	+5	15	
4	Guarany de Cruz Alta	13	5	5	3	13	10	+3	15	
5	Ypiranga de Erechim	13	4	7	2	15	11	+4	15	
6	Santa Cruz	13	4	7	2	10	10	0	15	
7	Glória	13	4	6	3	10	13	−3	14	
8	Juventude	13	5	3	5	10	11	−1	13	
9	Internacional	13	4	5	4	12	8	+4	13	
10	Esportivo	13	4	3	6	12	14	−2	11	
11	Lajeadense	13	3	5	5	6	13	−7	11	
12	Passo Fundo	13	2	7	4	9	14	−5	11	
13	Novo Hamburgo	13	3	2	8	14	19	−5	8	
14	Aimoré	13	1	5	7	9	23	−14	7	

Updated to match(es) played on June 22, 1990. Source: RSSSF.com
Rules for classification: 1) points; 2) wins; 3) goal difference; 4) number of goals scored.

==== Final standings ====
Pos	Team	Pld	W	D	L	GF	GA	GD	Pts	Qualification or relegation
1	Grêmio	26	15	7	4	50	16	+34	37	Qualified
2	Caxias	26	13	9	4	37	25	+12	35	Qualified
3	Internacional	26	11	10	5	27	12	+15	32	Qualified
4	Juventude	26	10	8	8	26	23	+3	28	Playoffs
5	Ypiranga de Erechim	26	9	10	7	34	28	+6	28	Playoffs
6	Pelotas	26	9	10	7	29	23	+6	28	
7	Guarany de Cruz Alta	26	9	9	8	23	24	−1	27	
8	Santa Cruz	26	6	14	6	22	27	−5	26	
9	Esportivo	26	8	7	11	28	30	−2	23	
10	Glória	26	7	10	9	22	30	−8	24	
11	Lajeadense	26	6	10	10	16	30	−14	22	
12	Passo Fundo	26	6	9	11	22	34	−12	21	
13	Novo Hamburgo	26	6	6	14	22	38	−16	18	Relegated
14	Aimoré	26	1	13	12	16	36	−20	15	Relegated

Updated to match(es) played on June 22, 1990. Source: RSSSF.com
Rules for classification: 1) points; 2) wins; 3) goal difference; 4) number of goals scored.

==== Playoffs ====
Team 1	Score	Team 2
Juventude	1–0	Ypiranga de Erechim

=== Final quadrangular ===
Pos	Team	Pld	W	D	L	GF	GA	GD	Pts	Qualification or relegation
1	Grêmio	6	3	3	0	13	7	+6	10	Champions
2	Caxias	6	1	5	0	5	4	+1	7	
3	Internacional	6	1	2	3	5	8	−3	4	
4	Juventude	6	0	4	2	6	10	−4	4	

Updated to match(es) played on July 29, 1990. Source: RSSSF.com
Rules for classification: 1) points; 2) wins; 3) goal difference; 4) number of goals scored.

== State Cups ==
Two state cups, the Copa Cidade de Porto Alegre and the Copa Aneron Corrêa de Oliveira were slated to be disputed in the first semester of 1991 by the Second-level teams - the former for the clubs from the south of the state and the Porto Alegre region, and the latter for the clubs of the north of the state. However, once it was decided that the First level would be expanded to twenty clubs in 1991, these cups also became qualifiers for the first level.

In the Copa Cidade de Porto Alegre, the seventeen clubs were divided into two groups, one with eight and other with nine teams, in which the teams in a group played each other in a double round-robin format, with the two teams with the most points qualifying to the 1991 First level and to the Semifinals, the winners of which played each other to define the champions.

In the Copa Aneron Corrêa, the fifteen clubs were divided into two groups, one with eight and other with seven teams, in which the teams in a group played each other in a double round-robin format, with the four teams with the most points qualifying to the Second phase. In the second phase, the qualified teams in each group would play each other in a double round-robin format once more, with the best team of each group qualifying to the 1991 First level and to the Finals.

=== Copa Cidade de Porto Alegre ===
==== First phase ====
===== Group 1 =====
Pos	Team	Pld	W	D	L	GF	GA	GD	Pts	Qualification or relegation
1	Brasil de Pelotas	16	10	6	0	31	9	+22	26	Qualified;Promoted
2	São Paulo	16	8	7	1	21	8	+13	23	Qualified;Promoted
3	Guarany de Bagé	16	9	4	3	19	13	+6	22	
4	Grêmio Santanense	16	7	5	4	14	14	0	19	
5	14 de Julho	16	7	4	5	23	16	+7	18	
6	Grêmio Bagé	16	4	4	8	17	21	−4	12	
7	Farroupilha	16	3	6	7	10	16	−6	12	
8	Rio-Grandense	16	2	4	10	10	25	−15	8	
9	Rio Grande	16	1	2	13	4	27	−23	4	

Updated to match(es) played on June 23, 1991. Source: RSSSF.com
Rules for classification: 1) points; 2) wins; 3) goal difference; 4) number of goals scored.

===== Group 2 =====
Pos	Team	Pld	W	D	L	GF	GA	GD	Pts	Qualification or relegation
1	Novo Hamburgo	14	10	4	0	28	4	+24	24	Qualified;Promoted
2	Aimoré	14	10	2	2	28	5	+23	22	Qualified;Promoted
3	Internacional de Santa Maria	14	8	4	2	29	8	+21	20	
4	São Borja	14	6	1	7	12	21	−9	13	
5	Encantado	14	4	4	6	13	14	−1	12	
6	São José	14	5	1	8	12	23	−11	11	
7	Estrela	14	2	4	8	8	24	−16	8	
8	Cruzeiro	14	0	2	12	5	36	−31	2	

Updated to match(es) played on June 16, 1991. Source: RSSSF.com
Rules for classification: 1) points; 2) wins; 3) goal difference; 4) number of goals scored.

==== Semifinals ====
Team 1	Agg.	Team 2	1st leg	2nd leg
São Paulo	0–0 (p. 10-11)	Novo Hamburgo	0–0	0–0
Aimoré	1–1 (p. 8-9)	Brasil de Pelotas	1–0	0–1

==== Finals ====
Team 1	Series	Team 2	Game 1	Game 2	Game 3
Novo Hamburgo	2–4	Brasil de Pelotas	0–1	1–0	0–4

=== Copa Aneron Corrêa de Oliveira ===
==== First phase ====
===== Group A =====
Pos	Team	Pld	W	D	L	GF	GA	GD	Pts	Qualification or relegation
1	Dínamo	12	9	3	0	18	3	+15	21	Qualified
2	Três Passos	12	5	3	4	14	8	+6	13	Qualified
3	SER São Gabriel	12	4	4	4	11	12	−1	12	Qualified
4	Tupy	12	5	2	5	13	9	+4	12	Qualified
5	Botafogo de Três de Maio	12	5	1	6	11	14	−3	11	
6	Flamengo de Horizontina	12	3	3	6	7	13	−6	9	
7	Rosário	12	2	2	8	10	25	−15	6	

Updated to match(es) played on June 9, 1991. Source: RSSSF.com
Rules for classification: 1) points; 2) wins; 3) goal difference; 4) number of goals scored.

===== Group B =====
Pos	Team	Pld	W	D	L	GF	GA	GD	Pts	Qualification or relegation
1	Guarany de Garibaldi	14	9	5	0	21	9	+12	23	Qualified
2	Ipiranga	14	6	6	2	15	12	+3	18	Qualified
3	Tabajara-Guaíba	14	7	3	4	17	7	+10	17	Qualified
4	Pratense	14	5	6	3	12	5	+7	16	Qualified
5	Igrejinha	14	3	6	5	15	17	−2	12	
6	Botafogo de Fagundes Varela	14	3	6	5	11	17	−6	12	
7	Veranense	14	2	6	6	5	11	−6	10	
8	Pradense	14	1	2	11	8	26	−18	4	

Updated to match(es) played on June 9, 1991. Source: RSSSF.com
Rules for classification: 1) points; 2) wins; 3) goal difference; 4) number of goals scored.

==== Second phase ====
===== Group C =====
Pos	Team	Pld	W	D	L	GF	GA	GD	Pts	Qualification or relegation
1	Dínamo	6	4	2	0	9	2	+7	10	Qualified;Promoted
2	Três Passos	6	2	4	0	4	1	+3	8	
3	Tupy	6	1	2	3	6	7	−1	4	
4	SER São Gabriel	6	0	2	4	1	10	−9	2	

Updated to match(es) played on July 21, 1991. Source: RSSSF.com
Rules for classification: 1) points; 2) wins; 3) goal difference; 4) number of goals scored.

===== Group D =====
Pos	Team	Pld	W	D	L	GF	GA	GD	Pts	Qualification or relegation
1	Tabajara-Guaíba	6	4	2	0	7	1	+6	10	Qualified;Promoted
2	Guarany de Garibaldi	6	2	3	1	9	6	+3	7	
3	Pratense	6	0	4	2	4	7	−3	4	
4	Ipiranga	6	0	3	3	0	6	−6	3	

Updated to match(es) played on July 21, 1991. Source: RSSSF.com
Rules for classification: 1) points; 2) wins; 3) goal difference; 4) number of goals scored.

==== Finals ====
Team 1	Agg.	Team 2	1st leg	2nd leg
Tabajara-Guaíba	2–0	Dínamo	2–0	0–0
