= Ricardo Thalheimer =

Brazilian footballer

Personal information
- Date of birth: 29 December 1992 (age 33)
- Place of birth: Santo Augusto, Brazil
- Height: 1.84 m (6 ft 0 in)
- Position: Centre back

Team information
- Current team: São Luiz

Youth career
- São Luiz
- Cruzeiro de Santiago
- Fragata
- União Frederiquense

Senior career*
| Years | Team | Apps | (Gls) |
| 2013–2015 | União Frederiquense | 4 | (0) |
| 2013 | → Três Passos (loan) | | |
| 2014 | → Palmeirense (loan) | 13 | (0) |
| 2015 | → Santo Ângelo (loan) | 19 | (1) |
| 2016 | Tupy | 20 | (0) |
| 2017–2018 | São Luiz | 33 | (3) |
| 2018 | Novo Hamburgo | 8 | (0) |
| 2017–2019 | São Luiz | 7 | (0) |
| 2019 | Avaí | 21 | (0) |
| 2020 | CRB | 5 | (0) |
| 2020–2021 | Ypiranga | 6 | (0) |
| 2021 | Aimoré | 3 | (0) |
| 2021–2022 | Internacional | | |
| 2022– | São Luiz | 21 | (0) |
- * Club domestic league appearances and goals as of 11 March 2023

Ricardo Thalheimer (born 29 December 1992) is a Brazilian footballer who plays as a central defender for São Luiz.

== Club career ==
Born in Santo Augusto, Rio Grande do Sul, Ricardo finished his formation with União Frederiquense in 2012, being promoted to the first team on 26 November of that year. After representing lowly locals Três Passos, EC Palmeirense, Santo Ângelo and Tupy, he joined São Luiz for the 2017 season.

On 11 August 2017, after winning the year's Campeonato Gaúcho Série A2, Ricardo renewed his contract with São Luiz. In April of the following year, he moved to Novo Hamburgo for the 2018 Campeonato Brasileiro Série D, but agreed to return to his previous club in August.

On 21 February 2019, Ricardo was presented at Série A side Avaí. He made his top tier debut on 12 May, starting in a 0–0 home draw against CSA.

== Honours ==
São Luiz

- Campeonato Gaúcho Série A2: 2017

Avaí

- Campeonato Catarinense: 2019
