= Sander (footballer) =

Brazilian footballer

Personal information
- Full name: Sander Henrique Bortolotto
- Date of birth: 3 October 1990 (age 36)
- Place of birth: Corumbá de Goiás, Brazil
- Height: 1.77 m (5 ft 9 1/2 in)
- Position: Left back

Team information
- Current team: Novorizontino
- Number: 5

Youth career
- 2010–2011: São Luiz
- 2011: → Santo Ângelo (loan)

Senior career*
| Years | Team | Apps | (Gls) |
| 2011 | Três Passos | | |
| 2011 | Concórdia | 0 | (0) |
| 2012 | Santo Ângelo | | |
| 2012–2013 | Tupy-RS | 27 | (2) |
| 2013 | → Panambi (loan) | 13 | (0) |
| 2014 | São José-RS | 7 | (0) |
| 2014 | Rio Branco-AC | 7 | (1) |
| 2015 | Avaí | 3 | (0) |
| 2016 | Cruzeiro-RS | 4 | (0) |
| 2016 | Ypiranga-RS | 22 | (0) |
| 2017 | Cruzeiro-RS | 12 | (0) |
| 2017–2022 | Sport | 225 | (6) |
| 2023–2024 | Goiás | 69 | (1) |
| 2025 | Cuiabá | 34 | (0) |
| 2026– | Novorizontino | 16 | (1) |
- * Club domestic league appearances and goals as of 17 November 2026

Sander Henrique Bortolotto (born 3 October 1990), simply known as Sander, is a Brazilian professional footballer who plays as a left back for Grêmio Novorizontino.

== Club career ==
Born in Corumbá de Goiás, Sander finished his formation with São Luiz, and made his senior debut with Três Passos in 2011. He subsequently moved to Concórdia in the same year, and on 12 July 2012 was announced at Tupy de Crissiumal.

After a short spell at Panambi, Sander featured regularly for Tupi during the 2013 season, also scoring a goal in the Campeonato Gaúcho Série B final against Nova Prata which ensured the club's first professional title of their history. On 29 November 2013, he agreed to a move to São José-RS.

On 1 April 2014 Sander signed for Rio Branco-AC, and impressed enough to secure a move to Série A side Avaí on 20 January 2015. However, he only featured rarely for the club, and joined Cruzeiro-RS on 1 March 2016.

On 18 April 2016, Sander signed a contract with Ypiranga-RS until the end of the year. On 20 December he returned to his previous club, becoming an undisputed starter for the side and being named the best left back of the 2017 Campeonato Gaúcho.

On 6 June 2017, Sander signed for top tier club Sport.

== Career statistics ==
As of 14 May 2017

| Club | Season | League | | | State League | | Cup | | Continental | | Other | | Total | |
| Club | Season | Division | Apps | Goals | Apps | Goals | Apps | Goals | Apps | Goals | Apps | Goals | Apps | Goals |
|---|---|---|---|---|---|---|---|---|---|---|---|---|---|---|
| Concórdia | 2011 | Catarinense | — | | 0 | 0 | — | | — | | 3 (Note: All appearance(s) in Copa Santa Catarina) | 0 | 3 | 0 |
| Tupy-RS | 2012 | Gaúcho Série B | — | | 10 | 1 | — | | — | | — | | 10 | 1 |
| Tupy-RS | 2013 | Gaúcho Série B | — | | 17 | 1 | — | | — | | — | | 17 | 1 |
| Tupy-RS | Subtotal | | — | | 27 | 2 | — | | — | | — | | 27 | 2 |
| Panambi (loan) | 2013 | Gaúcho Série A2 | — | | 13 | 0 | — | | — | | — | | 12 | 7 |
| São José-RS | 2014 | Gaúcho | — | | 7 | 0 | — | | — | | — | | 7 | 0 |
| Rio Branco-AC | 2014 | Série D | 0 | 0 | 6 | 1 | 1 | 0 | — | | — | | 7 | 1 |
| Avaí | 2015 | Série A | 0 | 0 | 3 | 0 | 0 | 0 | — | | — | | 3 | 0 |
| Cruzeiro-RS | 2016 | Gaúcho | — | | 4 | 0 | — | | — | | — | | 4 | 0 |
| Ypiranga-RS | 2016 | Série C | 18 | 0 | — | | 4 | 0 | — | | 11 (Note: All appearance(s) in Supercopa Gaúcha) | 0 | 33 | 0 |
| Cruzeiro-RS | 2017 | Gaúcho | — | | 12 | 0 | — | | — | | — | | 12 | 0 |
| Career total | | | 18 | 0 | 72 | 3 | 5 | 0 | 0 | 0 | 14 | 0 | 109 | 3 |

== Honours ==
=== Club ===
Tupy-RS

- Campeonato Gaúcho Série B: 2013

Rio Branco-AC

- Campeonato Acreano: 2014

Sport

- Campeonato Pernambucano: 2017, 2019

Goiás

- Copa Verde: 2023

Novorizontino

- Campeonato Brasileiro Série B: 2026

=== Individual ===
- Campeonato Gaúcho Melhores onze: 2017
- Campeonato Gaúcho Melhor recém-chegado: 2017
