= 1976 Campeonato Gaúcho =

Campeonato Gaúcho
- Season: 1976
- Champions: Internacional
- 1976 Copa Brasil: Grêmio; Internacional; Caxias
- 1977 Copa Brasil: Grêmio; Internacional; Caxias; Juventude
- Matches: 324
- Goals: 700 (2.16 per match)
- Top goalscorer: Alcino (Grêmio) – 17 goals
- Biggest home win: Internacional 14–0 Ferro Carril (May 23, 1976)
- Biggest away win: Ferro Carril 0-5 Grêmio (March 28, 1976)
- Highest scoring: Internacional 14–0 Ferro Carril (May 23, 1976)

The 56th season of the Campeonato Gaúcho kicked off on January 18, 1976, and ended on August 22, 1976. Thirty-two teams participated. Internacional won their 24th title.

== Participating teams ==
Club	Stadium	Home location	Previous season
Aimoré	Cristo-Rei	São Leopoldo	24th
Alegrete	Municipal Farroupilha	Alegrete	22nd
Armour	Miguel Copatti	Santana do Livramento	–
Atlântico	Baixada Rubra	Erechim	29th
Atlético de Carazinho	Paulo Coutinho	Carazinho	8th
Cruzeiro	Beira-Rio	Porto Alegre	–
Caxias	Baixada Rubra	Caxias do Sul	3rd
Esportivo	Montanha	Bento Gonçalves	21st
Estrela	Walter Jobim	Estrela	–
Farroupilha	Nicolau Fico	Pelotas	28th
Ferro Carril	Joal de Lima e Silva	Uruguaiana	–
Gaúcho	Wolmar Salton	Passo Fundo	9th
Grêmio	Pedra Moura	Bagé	10th
Grêmio	Olímpico	Porto Alegre	2nd
Guarany	Estrela D'Alva	Bagé	14th
Guarany	Alcides Santarosa	Garibaldi	31st
Internacional	Beira-Rio	Porto Alegre	1st
Internacional	Vicente Goulart	São Borja	16th
Internacional	Presidente Vargas	Santa Maria	5th
Juventude	Alfredo Jaconi	Caxias do Sul	–
Juventude	Ernesto Dornelles	Guaporé	32nd
Lajeadense	Florestal	Lajeado	13th
Pelotas	Boca do Lobo	Pelotas	23rd
Pradense	Waldemar Grazziotin	Antônio Prado	–
Rio-Grandense	Torquato Pontes	Rio Grande	12th
São José	Passo d'Areia	Porto Alegre	15th
São Luiz	19 de Outubro	Ijuí	6th
Santa Cruz	Plátanos	Santa Cruz do Sul	4th
Santa Rosa	Carlos Denardin	Santa Rosa	–
Sá Viana	Álamos	Uruguaiana	–
Tupi	Eucaliptos	Crissiumal	30th
Ypiranga	Colosso da Lagoa	Erechim	11th

== System ==
The championship would have four stages.:

- Preliminary phase: The thirty clubs that had qualified in the Copa Governador do Estado of the previous year would be divided into six groups of five teams. Each team would play against the teams of their own group twice and the three best teams of each group would qualify to the First stage.
- First phase: The remaining eighteen teams, now joined by Grêmio and Internacional, would play each other once. The four best teams would qualify to the Second round. The winner would also qualify for the Final phase.
- Second phase: The remaining four teams would play each other twice. the best team in each round qualified to the Final phase.
- Finals: The winners of the first stage and the two rounds of the second stage qualified to this stage. Each participant would have one point allotted to them by stage won, and the teams would play each other until one reached four points, with that team winning the title.

== Championship ==
=== Preliminary phase ===
==== Group 1 ====
Pos	Team	Pld	W	D	L	GF	GA	GD	Pts	Qualification or relegation
1	Inter de São Borja	8	4	2	2	8	5	+3	10	Qualified to First phase
2	Grêmio Bagé	8	4	2	2	7	5	+2	10	Qualified to First phase
3	Ferro Carril	8	3	3	2	8	6	+2	9	Qualified to First phase
4	Alegrete	8	2	2	4	4	8	−4	6	
5	Pelotas	8	2	1	5	5	8	−3	5	

Updated to match(es) played on March 21, 1976. Source: RSSSF.com
Rules for classification: 1) points; 2) wins; 3) goal difference; 4) number of goals scored.

==== Group 2 ====
Pos	Team	Pld	W	D	L	GF	GA	GD	Pts	Qualification or relegation
1	Rio-Grandense	8	3	4	1	13	5	+8	10	Qualified to First phase
2	Guarany de Bagé	8	3	4	1	6	3	+3	10	Qualified to First phase
3	Sá Viana	8	3	3	2	8	8	0	9	Qualified to First phase
4	Farroupilha	8	3	3	2	9	10	−1	9	
5	Armour	8	0	2	6	4	14	−10	2	

Updated to match(es) played on March 21, 1976. Source: RSSSF.com
Rules for classification: 1) points; 2) wins; 3) goal difference; 4) number of goals scored.

==== Group 3 ====
Pos	Team	Pld	W	D	L	GF	GA	GD	Pts	Qualification or relegation
1	Esportivo	8	4	4	0	9	3	+6	12	Qualified to First phase
2	Cruzeiro	8	3	3	2	8	4	+4	9	Qualified to First phase
3	Juventude	8	2	5	1	7	5	+2	9	Qualified to First phase
4	Aimoré	8	2	3	3	5	8	−3	7	
5	Lajeadense	8	0	3	5	2	11	−9	3	

Updated to match(es) played on March 21, 1976. Source: RSSSF.com
Rules for classification: 1) points; 2) wins; 3) goal difference; 4) number of goals scored.

==== Group 4 ====
Pos	Team	Pld	W	D	L	GF	GA	GD	Pts	Qualification or relegation
1	Caxias	8	6	1	1	14	2	+12	13	Qualified to First phase
2	Santa Cruz	8	5	1	2	11	4	+7	11	Qualified to First phase
3	Estrela	8	4	0	4	11	9	+2	8	Qualified to First phase
4	São José	8	2	3	3	6	9	−3	7	
5	Guarany de Garibaldi	8	0	1	7	4	22	−18	1	

Updated to match(es) played on March 21, 1976. Source: RSSSF.com
Rules for classification: 1) points; 2) wins; 3) goal difference; 4) number of goals scored.

==== Group 5 ====
Pos	Team	Pld	W	D	L	GF	GA	GD	Pts	Qualification or relegation
1	Atlântico	8	4	4	0	12	4	+8	12	Qualified to First phase Finals
2	São Luiz	8	3	5	0	14	5	+9	11	Qualified to First phase Finals
3	Atlético de Carazinho	8	2	4	2	7	6	+1	8	Qualified to First phase Finals
4	Juventude de Guaporé	8	2	3	3	11	22	−11	7	
5	Pradense	8	1	0	7	5	22	−17	2	

Updated to match(es) played on March 21, 1976. Source: RSSSF.com
Rules for classification: 1) points; 2) wins; 3) goal difference; 4) number of goals scored.

==== Group 6 ====
Pos	Team	Pld	W	D	L	GF	GA	GD	Pts	Qualification or relegation
1	Gaúcho	8	3	5	0	18	4	+14	11	Qualified to First phase Finals
2	Internacional de Santa Maria	8	3	4	1	12	5	+7	10	Qualified to First phase Finals
3	Ypiranga de Erechim	8	1	6	1	8	7	+1	8	Qualified to First phase Finals
4	Tupi	8	1	4	3	11	18	−7	6	
5	Santa Rosa	8	1	3	4	3	17	−14	5	

Updated to match(es) played on March 21, 1976. Source: RSSSF.com
Rules for classification: 1) points; 2) wins; 3) goal difference; 4) number of goals scored.

=== First phase ===
Pos	Team	Pld	W	D	L	GF	GA	GD	Pts	Qualification or relegation
1	Grêmio	19	18	0	1	45	8	+37	36	Playoffs
2	Internacional	19	17	2	0	55	4	+51	36	Playoffs
3	Caxias	19	11	4	4	28	12	+16	26	Qualified to Second round
4	Esportivo	19	11	4	4	29	17	+12	26	Qualified to Second round
5	Atlântico	19	7	7	5	16	10	+6	21	
6	Inter de São Borja	19	7	6	6	23	22	+1	20	
7	Juventude	19	6	8	5	17	16	+1	20	
8	Internacional de Santa Maria	19	5	9	5	18	19	−1	19	
9	Estrela	19	7	5	7	16	17	−1	19	
10	Atlético de Carazinho	19	5	8	6	16	17	−1	18	
11	Guarany de Bagé	19	6	6	7	10	14	−4	18	
12	Grêmio Bagé	19	7	4	8	19	24	−5	18	
13	Ypiranga de Erechim	19	6	6	7	13	20	−7	18	
14	Gaúcho	19	6	5	8	28	30	−2	17	
15	Cruzeiro	19	3	9	7	16	18	−2	15	
16	Santa Cruz	19	4	7	8	16	23	−7	15	
17	São Luiz	19	5	5	9	16	24	−8	15	
18	Rio-Grandense	19	2	6	11	11	31	−20	10	
19	Sá Viana	19	4	1	14	12	41	−29	9	
20	Ferro Carril	19	1	2	16	11	59	−48	4	

Updated to match(es) played on July 25, 1976. Source: RSSSF.com
Rules for classification: 1) points; 2) goal difference; 3) wins; 4) number of goals scored.

==== Playoffs ====
28 July 1977
Finals

Grêmio	2 – 0	Internacional
Alexandre Bueno 40'; Ancheta 58'	Report

Olímpico, Porto Alegre
Attendance: 46,822
Referee: Agomar Martins Röhrig

=== Second phase ===
==== First round ====
Pos	Team	Pld	W	D	L	GF	GA	GD	Pts	Qualification or relegation
1	Internacional	3	3	0	0	8	2	+6	6	Qualified to Final phase
2	Grêmio	3	2	0	1	6	3	+3	4	
3	Esportivo	3	1	0	2	5	9	−4	2	
4	Caxias	3	0	0	3	3	8	−5	0	

Updated to match(es) played on August 9, 1976. Source: RSSSF.com
Rules for classification: 1) points; 2) wins; 3) goal difference; 4) number of goals scored.

==== Second round ====
Pos	Team	Pld	W	D	L	GF	GA	GD	Pts	Qualification or relegation
1	Internacional	3	2	1	0	4	1	+3	5	Qualified to Final phase
2	Grêmio	3	0	3	0	2	2	0	3	
3	Caxias	3	0	2	1	2	3	−1	2	
4	Esportivo	3	0	2	1	1	3	−2	2	

Updated to match(es) played on August 22, 1976. Source: RSSSF.com
Rules for classification: 1) points; 2) wins; 3) goal difference; 4) number of goals scored.

=== Finals ===
Teams			Scores		
Team 1	Points	Team 2	1st leg	2nd leg	Agg.
Internacional	4:1	Grêmio	2:0	—	2:0

22 August 1976
Finals

Internacional	2 – 0	Grêmio
Lula 59'; Dario 65'	Report

Beira-Rio, Porto Alegre
Referee: Agomar Martins Röhrig

== Copa Governador do Estado ==
=== System ===
The cup would have six stages:

- First phase: The twenty-four teams that had been eliminated in the Final phase of the previous year's Copa Governador do Estado would be divided into six groups of four teams. each team would play twice against the teams of its own group. All teams qualified to the Second phase.
- Second phase: The twenty-four teams joined the twelve teams that had been eliminated in the Preliminary phase of the Campeonato Gaúcho and were divided into six groups of six teams. Once again, all teams qualified to the Third phase.
- Third phase: The thirty-six teams joined the sixteen teams that had been eliminated in the First phase of the Campeonato Gaúcho and were divided into ten groups of five teams. The two best teams of each group and the two best third-placers would qualify to the 1977 Campeonato Gaúcho. The best teams of each group qualified to the Fourth phase. wins by two goals of difference or more were worth an extra point.
- Fourth phase: The remaining ten teams would play each other in a double-legged knockout tie. The qualified team with the best performance in the previous stage qualified directly to the Final phase.
- Fifth phase: The remaining four teams would play each other in a double-legged knockout tie. The winners qualified to the Final phase.
- Final phase: The remaining three teams would play each other once. The team with the most points won the title.

=== Third phase ===
==== Group A ====
Pos	Team	Pld	W	D	L	GF	GA	GD	Pts	Qualification or relegation
1	Rio-Grandense	8	3	4	1	6	3	+3	11 (Note: Rio-Grandense withdrew from its berth in the 1977 Campeonato Gaúcho)	Qualified to Fourth phase
2	Pelotas	8	2	4	2	6	4	+2	10	Qualified to 1977 Campeonato Gaúcho
3	Grêmio Bagé	8	3	4	1	4	4	0	10	Qualified to 1977 Campeonato Gaúcho
4	Armour	8	2	4	2	5	5	0	8	
5	Farroupilha	8	1	2	5	4	9	−5	4	

Updated to match(es) played on October 30, 1976. Source: RSSSF.com
Rules for classification: 1) points; 2) wins; 3) goal difference; 4) number of goals scored.

==== Group B ====
Pos	Team	Pld	W	D	L	GF	GA	GD	Pts	Qualification or relegation
1	Guarany de Bagé	8	4	4	0	11	6	+5	13	Qualified to 1977 Campeonato Gaúcho;Fourth phase
2	Brasil de Pelotas	8	3	3	2	10	8	+2	10	Qualified to 1977 Campeonato Gaúcho
3	São Paulo	8	3	2	3	16	15	+1	10	Qualified to 1977 Campeonato Gaúcho
4	Rio Grande	8	2	3	3	9	10	−1	8	
5	Fluminense	8	1	2	5	7	4	+3	4	

Updated to match(es) played on October 31, 1976. Source: RSSSF.com
Rules for classification: 1) points; 2) wins; 3) goal difference; 4) number of goals scored.

==== Group C ====
Pos	Team	Pld	W	D	L	GF	GA	GD	Pts	Qualification or relegation
1	São Gabriel	8	6	1	1	14	8	+6	15 (Note: São Gabriel withdrew from its berth in the 1977 Campeonato Gaúcho)	Qualified to Fourth phase
2	Riograndense	8	4	2	2	12	5	+7	12	Qualified to 1977 Campeonato Gaúcho
3	Alegrete	8	4	0	4	9	14	−5	9	
4	Sá Viana	8	1	2	5	7	19	−12	5	
5	Cruzeiro de São Borja	8	2	1	5	5	11	−6	5	

Updated to match(es) played on October 31, 1976. Source: RSSSF.com
Rules for classification: 1) points; 2) wins; 3) goal difference; 4) number of goals scored.

==== Group D ====
Pos	Team	Pld	W	D	L	GF	GA	GD	Pts	Qualification or relegation
1	São Luiz	8	6	1	1	13	5	+8	16	Qualified to 1977 Campeonato Gaúcho;Fourth phase
2	Santo Ângelo	8	5	0	3	14	6	+8	14 (Note: Santo Ângelo withdrew from its berth in the 1977 Campeonato Gaúcho)	
3	Inter de São Borja	8	3	2	3	13	8	+5	10	Qualified to 1977 Campeonato Gaúcho
4	Santa Rosa	8	2	1	5	7	12	−5	6	
5	Tupi	8	2	0	6	6	22	−16	4	

Updated to match(es) played on October 31, 1976. Source: RSSSF.com
Rules for classification: 1) points; 2) wins; 3) goal difference; 4) number of goals scored.

==== Group E ====
Pos	Team	Pld	W	D	L	GF	GA	GD	Pts	Qualification or relegation
1	Internacional de Santa Maria	8	6	2	0	16	4	+12	17	Qualified to 1977 Campeonato Gaúcho;Fourth phase
2	Cachoeira	8	5	1	2	21	6	+15	16	Qualified to 1977 Campeonato Gaúcho
3	Oriente de São Gabriel	8	3	2	3	8	10	−2	10	
4	Pedro Osório	8	2	0	6	5	17	−12	4	
5	XIV de Julho de Itaqui	8	1	1	6	3	16	−13	4	

Updated to match(es) played on October 31, 1976. Source: RSSSF.com
Rules for classification: 1) points; 2) wins; 3) goal difference; 4) number of goals scored.

==== Group F ====
Pos	Team	Pld	W	D	L	GF	GA	GD	Pts	Qualification or relegation
1	Gaúcho	8	6	0	2	13	8	+5	15	Qualified to 1977 Campeonato Gaúcho;Fourth phase
2	Atlético de Carazinho	8	5	0	3	16	5	+11	14	Qualified to 1977 Campeonato Gaúcho
3	Atlântico	8	5	1	2	11	5	+6	14	
4	Santa Bárbara	8	1	2	5	5	13	−8	4	
5	Juventude de Guaporé	8	1	1	6	7	21	−14	3	

Updated to match(es) played on October 31, 1976. Source: RSSSF.com
Rules for classification: 1) points; 2) wins; 3) goal difference; 4) number of goals scored.

==== Group G ====
Pos	Team	Pld	W	D	L	GF	GA	GD	Pts	Qualification or relegation
1	Juventude	8	5	3	0	18	1	+17	17	Qualified to 1977 Campeonato Gaúcho;Fourth phase
2	Ypiranga de Erechim	8	5	3	0	11	2	+9	16	Qualified to 1977 Campeonato Gaúcho
3	14 de Julho	8	4	1	3	13	11	+2	12	Qualified to 1977 Campeonato Gaúcho
4	Tabajara-Guaíba	8	1	1	6	3	16	−13	4	
5	Glória	8	0	2	6	2	17	−15	2	

Updated to match(es) played on October 31, 1976. Source: RSSSF.com
Rules for classification: 1) points; 2) wins; 3) goal difference; 4) number of goals scored.

==== Group H ====
Pos	Team	Pld	W	D	L	GF	GA	GD	Pts	Qualification or relegation
1	Santa Cruz	8	3	4	1	14	11	+3	11	Qualified to 1977 Campeonato Gaúcho;Fourth phase
2	Cruzeiro	8	3	4	1	10	8	+2	11	Qualified to 1977 Campeonato Gaúcho
3	Estrela	8	3	4	1	6	4	+2	10	Qualified to 1977 Campeonato Gaúcho
4	Lajeadense	8	1	4	3	7	7	0	7	
5	Encantado	8	1	2	5	9	16	−7	4	

Updated to match(es) played on =October 31, 1976. Source: RSSSF.com
Rules for classification: 1) points; 2) wins; 3) goal difference; 4) number of goals scored.

==== Group I ====
Pos	Team	Pld	W	D	L	GF	GA	GD	Pts	Qualification or relegation
1	São José	8	6	1	1	13	2	+11	16 (Note: São José withdrew from its berth on the 1977 Campeonato Gaúcho)	Qualified to Fourth phase
2	Novo Hamburgo	8	4	2	2	14	5	+9	14	Qualified to 1977 Campeonato Gaúcho
3	Aimoré	8	4	4	0	10	3	+7	13	
4	Igrejinha	8	1	2	5	9	16	−7	5	
5	Mundo Novo	8	0	1	7	2	22	−20	1	

Updated to match(es) played on October 31, 1976. Source: RSSSF.com
Rules for classification: 1) points; 2) wins; 3) goal difference; 4) number of goals scored.

==== Group J ====
Pos	Team	Pld	W	D	L	GF	GA	GD	Pts	Qualification or relegation
1	Esportivo	8	7	1	0	21	1	+20	21	Qualified to 1977 Campeonato Gaúcho;Fourth phase
2	Guarany de Garibaldi	8	2	4	2	10	10	0	9	
3	Pratense	8	2	4	2	2	8	−6	8	
4	Pradense	8	1	3	4	6	11	−5	6	
5	Botafogo de Fagundes Varela	8	0	4	4	3	12	−9	4	

Updated to match(es) played on October 31, 1976. Source: RSSSF.com
Rules for classification: 1) points; 2) wins; 3) goal difference; 4) number of goals scored.

=== Fourth phase ===
Team 1	Agg.	Team 2	1st leg	2nd leg
São Gabriel	3–2	São Luiz	2–1	1–1
Rio-Grandense	0–2	Guarany de Bagé	0–1	0–1
Inter de Santa Maria	2–4 (a.e.t)	Gaúcho	1–0	1–4
Juventude	5–2	Santa Cruz	3–1	2–1
São José	1–3	Esportivo	1–1	0–2

=== Fifth phase ===
Team 1	Agg.	Team 2	1st leg	2nd leg
Guarany de Bagé	2–2 (pen. 3-4)	São Gabriel	0–1	2–1
Gaúcho	0–2	Juventude	0–2	0–0
Esportivo		bye		

=== Final phase ===
Pos	Team	Pld	W	D	L	GF	GA	GD	Pts	Qualification or relegation
1	Juventude	2	1	1	0	5	1	+4	4	Champions
2	Esportivo	2	1	1	0	5	2	+3	4	
3	São Gabriel	2	0	0	2	1	8	−7	0	

Updated to match(es) played on December 12, 1976. Source: RSSSF.com
Rules for classification: 1) points; 2) wins; 3) goal difference; 4) number of goals scored.
