= Gardel =

Gardel may refer to:

== People ==
- Carlos Gardel (1890–1935), French-born Argentine singer, songwriter, composer and actor, a prominent figure in the history of tango
- Gabriele Gardel (born 1977), Swiss former racing driver
- Gardel (footballer) (1955–2009), Brazilian footballer
- Julio Sánchez Gardel (1879–1937), Argentine dramatist and writer
- Louis Gardel (born 1939), French novelist, screenwriter and publisher
- Margaret Gardel, American biophysicist
- Maximilien Gardel (1741–1787), French ballet dancer and choreographer
- Pierre Gardel (1758–1840), French ballet dancer and choreographer
- Sam Gardel (born 1988), Australian-Italian rugby league player

== Places ==
- Gardel, Guadeloupe, settlement in Le Moule, Guadeloupe
- Gardel Mehr, village in Lorestan, Iran
- Tazehabad-e Gardel Gari, village in Kermanshah, Iran

== Other uses ==
- Premios Gardel, Argentine music awards

== See also ==
- Gardell
- Gardella
- Gardelle
- Gardelli
- Gardellini
