= Jean Dias =

Brazilian footballer

Personal information
- Full name: Jean Dias da Costa
- Date of birth: 22 October 1990 (age 36)
- Place of birth: Conceição do Tocantins, Brazil
- Height: 1.70 m (5 ft 7 in)
- Position: Forward

Team information
- Current team: Cuiabá
- Number: 77

Youth career
- Goiânia

Senior career*
Years	Team	Apps	(Gls)
2010–2012	Goiânia	17	(1)
2011	→ Veranópolis (loan)	4	(0)
2012	→ Veranópolis (loan)	0	(0)
2012	→ Nova Prata (loan)	8	(2)
2013	Ariquemes	10	(1)
2013–2015	Nova Prata	49	(6)
2014	→ São Gabriel (loan)	2	(1)
2016	Brasil de Farroupilha	6	(0)
2017	São Luiz	15	(5)
2017	Metropolitano	2	(0)
2017–2018	Brusque	23	(3)
2018	→ Metropolitano (loan)	0	(0)
2019	Marcílio Dias	18	(3)
2019–2020	São Caetano	15	(3)
2020	Criciúma	19	(3)
2021	XV de Piracicaba	13	(1)
2021	Caxias	16	(1)
2022	São Luiz	11	(1)
2022	Marcílio Dias	13	(2)
2022	→ Manaus (loan)	4	(0)
2023	Caxias	14	(3)
2023	Internacional	10	(1)
2024	Paysandu	40	(6)
2025	Ponte Preta	25	(3)
2025–2026	Atlético Goianiense	27	(0)
2026–	Cuiabá	21	(3)
- * Club domestic league appearances and goals as of 18 November 2026

Jean Dias da Costa (born 22 October 1990), known as Jean Dias, is a Brazilian footballer who plays for Cuiabá. Mainly a forward, he can also play as an attacking midfielder.

== Club career ==
Born in Conceição do Tocantins, Tocantins, Jean Dias moved to Goiânia at early age and represented the youth sides of Goiânia EC. After making his senior debut with the side in the 2010 Campeonato Goiano Segunda Divisão, he had two spells at Veranópolis, the second one without playing.

In 2012, Jean Dias played for Nova Prata in the year's Campeonato Gaúcho Série B, and signed for Ariquemes in March 2013. He later returned to Nova Prata, achieving promotion from the Gauchão Série B in 2013 but being immediately relegated in the following year.

Jean Dias began the 2016 season with Brasil de Farroupilha, but became a free agent after the Campeonato Gaúcho Série A2 ended, and later worked in a rubber factory in Nova Prata before being invited to join São Luiz for the 2017 campaign. He also represented Metropolitano for a short period, before signing for Brusque on 4 September 2017.

In 2018, Jean Dias returned to Metropolitano on loan, but left on 31 August to return to Brusque. On 10 December of that year, he agreed to a deal with Marcílio Dias.

On 23 April 2019, Jean Dias moved to São Caetano, where he won the Copa Paulista and the Campeonato Paulista Série A2. On 19 June 2020, he was presented at Série C side Criciúma.

On 22 January 2021, Jean Dias was announced at XV de Piracicaba. On 3 June, after featuring regularly, he signed for Caxias.

Jean Dias returned to São Luiz on 26 November 2021, being a starter before returning to Marcílio Dias on 1 April 2022. On 19 July, he was loaned to Manaus in the third division, before returning to Marcílio and helping the side to win the 2022 Copa Santa Catarina.

In December 2022, Jean Dias returned to Caxias, and was a regular starter as the club reached the 2023 Campeonato Gaúcho finals. On 10 April 2023, he signed for Série A side Internacional until the end of the year.

Jean Dias made his top tier debut at the age of 32 on 15 April 2023, coming on as a second-half substitute for Pedro Henrique in a 1–1 away draw against Fortaleza.

== Career statistics ==
As of 26 January 2025

Club	Season	League			State League		Cup		Continental		Other		Total	
Club	Season	Division	Apps	Goals	Apps	Goals	Apps	Goals	Apps	Goals	Apps	Goals	Apps	Goals
Goiânia	2010	Goiano 2ª Divisão	—		8	0	—		—		—		8	0
Goiânia	2011	Goiano 2ª Divisão	—		4	1	—		—		—		4	1
Goiânia	2012	Goiano 2ª Divisão	—		5	0	—		—		—		5	0
Goiânia	Total		—		17	1	—		—		—		17	1
Veranópolis (loan)	2011	Gaúcho	—		4	0	—		—		—		4	0
Veranópolis (loan)	2012	Gaúcho	—		0	0	—		—		—		0	0
Nova Prata (loan)	2012	Gaúcho Série B	—		8	2	—		—		—		8	2
Ariquemes	2013	Rondoniense	—		10	1	—		—		—		10	1
Nova Prata	2013	Gaúcho Série B	—		20	2	—		—		—		20	2
Nova Prata	2014	Gaúcho Série A2	—		15	3	—		—		—		15	3
Nova Prata	2015	Gaúcho Série B	—		14	1	—		—		—		14	1
Nova Prata	Total		—		49	6	—		—		—		49	6
São Gabriel (loan)	2014	Gaúcho Série B	—		2	1	—		—		—		2	1
Brasil de Farroupilha	2016	Gaúcho Série A2	—		6	0	—		—		—		6	0
São Luiz	2017	Gaúcho Série A2	—		15	5	—		—		—		15	5
Metropolitano	2017	Série D	2	0	—		—		—		—		2	0
Brusque	2017	Série D	0	0	—		—		—		8 (Note: Appearance(s) in Copa Santa Catarina)	1	8	1
Brusque	2018	Série D	6	0	17	3	1	0	—		5	1	29	4
Brusque	Total		6	0	17	3	1	0	—		13	2	37	5
Metropolitano (loan)	2018	Catarinense Série B	—		8	0	—		—		—		8	0
Marcílio Dias	2019	Catarinense	—		18	3	—		—		—		18	3
São Caetano	2019	Série D	5	0	—		—		—		18 (Note: Appearance(s) in Copa Paulista)	5	23	5
São Caetano	2020	Paulista A2	—		10	3	—		—		—		10	3
São Caetano	Total		5	0	10	3	—		—		18	5	33	8
Criciúma	2020	Série C	15	2	4	1	—		—		—		19	3
XV de Piracicaba	2021	Paulista A2	—		13	1	—		—		—		13	1
Caxias	2021	Série D	16	1	—		—		—		—		16	1
São Luiz	2022	Série D	0	0	11	1	—		—		—		11	1
Marcílio Dias	2022	Série D	13	2	—		—		—		13	3	26	5
Manaus (loan)	2022	Série C	4	0	—		—		—		—		4	0
Caxias	2023	Série D	0	0	14	3	—		—		—		14	3
Internacional	2023	Série A	10	1	—		3	0	1 (Note: Appearance(s) in Copa Libertadores)	0	—		14	1
Paysandu	2024	Série B	28	4	12	2	2	0	—		4 (Note: Appearance(s) in Copa Verde)	0	46	6
Ponte Preta	2025	Série B	0	0	4	1	—		—		—		4	1
Career total			99	10	218	34	6	0	1	0	48	10	377	54

== Honours ==
São Luiz

- Campeonato Gaúcho Série A2: 2017

Metropolitano

- Campeonato Catarinense Série B: 2018

Brusque

- Copa Santa Catarina: 2018

São Caetano

- Copa Paulista: 2019
- Campeonato Paulista Série A2: 2020

Marcílio Dias

- Copa Santa Catarina: 2022

Paysandu

- Campeonato Paraense: 2024
- Copa Verde: 2024
