= Wagner (footballer, born 1991) =

Brazilian footballer

Personal information
- Full name: Wagner Ricardo Silva da Silva
- Date of birth: 27 May 1991 (age 35)
- Place of birth: Eldorado do Sul, Brazil
- Position: Attacking midfielder

Team information
- Current team: Avenida

Senior career*
Years	Team	Apps	(Gls)
2011	Santo Ângelo		
2013–2014	Três Passos	25	(3)
2014	Tupy-RS	0	(0)
2014	São José-RS	0	(0)
2015	Cruzeiro-RS	14	(3)
2015–2016	Chapecoense	19	(0)
2016	Goiás	24	(5)
2016–2017	Santa Cruz	3	(0)
2017	Caxias	14	(1)
2017	Brasil de Pelotas	14	(1)
2018	Cianorte	0	(0)
2018	→ Cruzerio-RS (loan)	9	(0)
2018	União Frederiquense	6	(1)
2018	Cruzerio-RS	0	(0)
2019	Aimoré	12	(2)
2019	Caxias	10	(0)
2020–	Avenida	0	(0)
2020	→ Aimoré (loan)	11	(3)
- * Club domestic league appearances and goals as of 13:01, 6 October 2020 (UTC)

Wagner Ricardo Silva da Silva (born 27 May 1991), simply known as Wagner, is a Brazilian footballer who plays for Avenida as an attacking midfielder.

== Club career ==
Born in Eldorado do Sul, Rio Grande do Sul, Wagner had failed trials at both Internacional and Grêmio. After making his debuts as a senior with Santo Ângelo in 2011, he went on to appear with Três Passos, Tupy, São José-PA and Cruzeiro, all in his native state, aside from playing for a number of amateur clubs.

With Cruzeiro, Wagner impressed during 2015 Campeonato Gaúcho. On 29 April of that year he signed a contract with Série A side Chapecoense.

Wagner made his debut in the main category of Brazilian football on 24 May 2015, coming on as a second-half substitute for Ananias in a 1–0 home win against Santos. He scored his first professional goal on 19 August 2015, netting the first in a 1–1 Copa Sudamericana away draw against Ponte Preta; it was also Chape's first goal in a continental competition.
