= Pablo (footballer, born March 1991) =

Brazilian footballer

Personal information
- Full name: Pablo Ricardo de Souza
- Date of birth: 7 March 1991 (age 35)
- Place of birth: São Gonçalo, Brazil
- Height: 1.87 m (6 ft 2 in)
- Position: Centre-back

Team information
- Current team: Aimoré

Youth career
- Atlético Paranaense
- Boavista

Senior career*
Years	Team	Apps	(Gls)
2012	Anapolina	3	(0)
2013	São José dos Campos	15	(3)
2013	Duque de Caxias	1	(0)
2014	São José dos Campos	18	(2)
2015	Mogi Mirim	4	(0)
2016	São Carlos	0	(0)
2017	Novo Hamburgo	16	(0)
2017–2018	Luverdense	29	(2)
2019	São Luiz	0	(0)
2019–2020	Aimoré	17	(0)
2020	Canaã-BA	4	(0)
2021–2022	São José-RS	46	(3)
2023	Sergipe	14	(0)
2023–2024	Sampaio Corrêa-RJ	15	(2)
2024	União Frederiquense	12	(1)
2025	Atlético Piauiense	0	(0)
2025	Inhumas	7	(0)
2025	Novo Hamburgo	16	(1)
- * Club domestic league appearances and goals

Pablo Ricardo de Souza (born 7 March 1991) is a Brazilian former professional footballer who played as a centre-back.

== Career ==
Born in São Gonçalo, Rio de Janeiro, Pablo represented Atlético Paranaense and Boavista as a youth. He started his senior professional career in 2012 with Anapolina, representing São José dos Campos, Jataiense, Duque de Caxias in the following years.

On 14 September 2015, Pablo signed with second-tier club Mogi Mirim. On 31 October, he made his debut, playing the whole ninety minutes of a 2–0 defeat against Ceará. He contributed with 4 games in the league.

In February 2017, Pablo signed with Novo Hamburgo after a stint with São Carlos. At Novo Hamburgo, he formed a partnership in central defence with the experienced Júlio Santos. He played 16 matches as his club won the 2017 Campeonato Gaúcho. On 11 May 2017, he signed with Luverdense of the second tier. He scored his first goal on 6 June, in a 1–1 draw against Vila Nova.

In the final years of his career, he also played for São José-RS, Sergipe, Atlético Piauiense, Sampaio Corrêa-RJ, among others. He retired while playing for Novo Hamburgo, once again winning the second tier of the Rio Grande do Sul state championship.

== Honours ==
Duque de Caxias

- Copa Rio: 2013

Novo Hamburgo

- Campeonato Gaúcho: 2017
- Campeonato Gaúcho Série A2: 2025

Sampaio Corrêa

- Campeonato Carioca Série A2: 2023
