= Dona Francisca =

Municipality of Rio Grande do Sul, Brazil

- Municipality
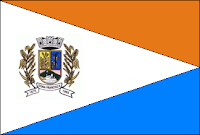
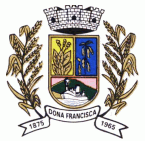
- Flag Coat of arms

- Location within Rio Grande do Sul

- Location in Brazil
- Coordinates: 29°37′S 53°21′W
- Country: Brazil
- State: Rio Grande do Sul

Population (2022)
  - Total: 3,079
- Time zone: UTC−3 (BRT)

Dona Francisca is a municipality in the state of Rio Grande do Sul, Brazil.

== Geography ==
It is located at a latitude of 29°37'18" south and a longitude of 53°21'26" west, at an altitude of 49 meters. According to the Brazilian Institute of Geography and Statistics (IBGE) in 2022, it had a population of 3,079 inhabitants. Its population is composed of people of Italian, German, Portuguese, and African descent.

== Paleontology ==
Researchers from the Lutheran University of Brazil (ULBRA) discovered in April 2010 a nearly complete fossil of a Prestosuchus chiniquensis, over seven meters long, weighing 900 kilograms, and approximately 238 million years old. It is the most complete and well-preserved specimen of its kind found in the world.

== Culture ==
Dona Francisca is the hometown of the world's first beatified altar boy, Adílio Daronch, who along with Father Manuel Gómez González were martyred for promoting harmony and concord between the Maragatos and Chimangos and defending the causes of faith, denouncing anything that incited war and discord among people.

The municipality has also been titled the National Capital of Rice Productivity.

City Anniversary

In the second half of July, the most traditional municipal festival in the region, the Week of Dona Francisca, is celebrated. This event lasts 10 days and includes festivities in all the communities of the municipality. During this week, there is also a traditional dance where the sovereigns of the municipality are chosen. The traditional "Motocross" event takes place on the last weekend of the festivities, attracting thousands of visitors, alongside the Agro-Industrial Fair.

== Economy ==
The main economic activity is agriculture, with rice and tobacco being the most cultivated products.

== Tourism ==
Padre José Iop Square is the main point of reference due to its strategic location, offering a broad view: to the north, the imposing Santo Antônio hill, and to the south, the Jacuí River with its productive floodplains.

Other spots to enjoy this landscape marked by German and Italian culture are located in the Trombudo area. The first is the Friedrich Family House, built in 1920; the other is the Secretti Family House, built in 1910. These are rustic buildings, unique examples of German and Italian colonial architecture in Rio Grande do Sul. Exploring their interiors is like stepping back in time: the hand-hewn wood, brick walls made by the immigrants themselves, and the layout of the spaces give the feel of living in a colonial house. These buildings are relics that should be visited. In Trombudo, one can also visit the Bat Cave, a natural sculpture in stone. Not far away is the Segatto Family Waterfall, which is surrounded by a diverse array of forest species. Visits to these places can be enjoyed on foot, allowing visitors to connect with nature and enjoy the fresh air.

=== Monument to Our Lady of the Navigators ===
On the banks of the Jacuí River, in the Obaldino Benjamin Tessele Historical Park, stands the Monument to Our Lady of the Navigators, the patron saint of the Municipality.

=== Jacuí River ===
The Jacuí River is a major asset of Dona Francisca, whose port today holds great historical value for having been the main outlet for the region's agricultural production in the past. To enhance its importance, it is also made a space for fun, recreation, and leisure. Activities such as canoeing, sport fishing, and boat rides are encouraged.

== See also ==
- List of municipalities in Rio Grande do Sul
