= Daronch =

Daronch is a surname. Notable people with the surname include:

- Adílio Daronch (1908–1924), Brazilian murder victim
- Carol DaRonch (born 1956), abductee of Ted Bundy
