= Adílio Daronch =

Brazilian martyr

Blessed Adílio Daronch

Martyr
- Born: 25 October 1908; Dona Francisca, Cachoeira do Sul, Rio Grande do Sul, Brazil
- Died: 21 May 1924 (aged 15); Feijão Miúdo, Três Passos, Rio Grande do Sul, Brazil
- Venerated in: Roman Catholic Church
- Beatified: 21 October 2007, Municipal Exposition Park, Frederico Westphalen, Brazil by Cardinal José Saraiva Martins
- Feast: 21 May
- Attributes: Palm
- Patronage: Diocese of Frederico Westphalen; WYD 2013 (co-patron)

Adílio Daronch (25 October 1908 – 21 May 1924) was a Brazilian Catholic adolescent.

Daronch was born to immigrants and lived his entire life in Brazil where he was known to have had a love for football and riding. He became a dedicated altar server following the reception of his First Communion and often accompanied the priest Manuel Gómez González on his long missions of evangelization. The pair were murdered in 1924 on one such mission after revolutionaries became outraged with Manuel's active apostolate in their area.

The pair's beatification process opened in Brazil in the late 1990s and culminated on 21 October 2007 with their beatification held in Brazil. Daronch was made the co-patron for World Youth Day 2013 and in 2012 was made the patron for the Diocese of Frederico Westphalen.

== Life ==
Adílio Daronch was born in Brazil in Rio Grande do Sul on 25 October 1908 as the third of eight children born to the immigrants Pietro Daronch (d. 5.5.1923) and Giuditta Segabinazzi (2.2.1884–23.3.1932). His father was an immigrant from Agordo in the Belluno province of Italy who settled in Brazil in 1890. His mother was also an immigrant. In 1911 the Daronchs moved to Passo Fundo and then again in 1913 to Nonoai. He was baptized on 1 November. His siblings were (in order):

- Herminia
- Abílio
- Zolmira
- Carmelinda
- Annita
- João
- Vilma

His sister Zolmira recounted that Daronch loved football and was a well-liked child. His sister Zolmira was born after the Daronch's moved to Passo Fundo while his siblings Carmelinda to Vilma were all born after the Daronch's next relocation. His Italian paternal grandparents were Sebastiano Da Ronch (b. 1829) and Francesca Schena (b. 1838) and his paternal uncles (in order) were Luigi and Vincenzo as well as his aunt Giovanna Maria; his father was the last-born to his grandparents. The Daronch's arrived in Rio de Janeiro from Genoa on the ship "Europa" on 1 December 1890 and his father began work as an apprentice shoemaker. His maternal grandparents were Felippe and Praxedes Girardi.

His parents married on 15 January 1905 at a wedding that the Pallottine priest Guido Spiesbenger oversaw. His father was later murdered in 1923.

He became a student at a school that the priest Manuel Gómez González managed and Daronch also accompanied the priest on his visits to the Kaingang Indians as part of his work in the missions. He served as an altar server after he made his First Communion (1917 or 1918) at which point he began serving Mass for González.

He and Gómez González were shot and killed on one such trip after revolutionaries attacked the pair. The Bishop of Santa Maria asked González in 1924 to go to the Teutonic colonies in the forest in the south so González decided to take Daronch with him; the two set off on this mission on 2 March around Easter. The pair stopped in Palmeria to administer the sacraments where González exhorted the local revolutionaries to practice mutual respect and forgiveness. But the extremists took a strong dislike to this and grew incensed when González provided a Christian burial for their victims, and plotted to kill them for this.

On 20 May 1924 the pair stopped in Braga (where some soldiers were stationed) to ask for directions, where Adílio Daronch attended González's final Mass, in a ruined chapel. The locals warned the two not to go into the forest where they would be at risk. But they proceeded and were ambushed in the morning of 21 May (and ordered off their mules) and were taken into a remote area in the forest before being bound to separate trees and shot dead. Their remains were discovered on 25 May and were buried; they were exhumed and relocated to the parish church in Nonoai in 1964. The people placed a monument on their place of death.

== Beatification ==
The beatification cause opened on 29 March 1996 under Pope John Paul II after the Congregation for the Causes of Saints issued the nihil obstat and titled Daronch as a Servant of God; the cause was joined to that of González. The diocesan process was held from 1996 to 1997 with the C.C.S. validating the investigation on 4 December 1998. The postulation sent the Positio to the C.C.S. for assessment in 2001 at which point historians met and approved the dossier on 13 February 2001; theologians approved it as well on 26 September 2006 as did the C.C.S. cardinal and bishop members that 21 November. Daronch and González's beatification received papal confirmation from Pope Benedict XVI a month later on 16 December after the pope confirmed that the pair were killed in odium fidei (in hatred of the faith).

Their beatification was celebrated in Rio Grande do Sul on 21 October 2007 with Cardinal José Saraiva Martins presiding over the celebration on the pope's behalf.

The current postulator for this cause is Paolo Vilotta.

=== Patronage ===
In mid-2012 Adílio Daronch was announced as a co-patron for WYD 2013.

On 21 September 2012 the Frederico Westphalen diocese announced that Daronch and González were the newest patrons for the diocese after the Congregation for Divine Worship and the Discipline of the Sacraments confirmed the request (lodged on 10 June 2012) in a decree on 14 September. The apostolic nuncio Giovanni d'Aniello received the news of this confirmation before likewise informing the diocesan bishop of this.

== See also ==
- List of unsolved murders (1900–1979)
