= Futebol com Vida =

- Full name: Clube Futebol com Vida
- Founded: 1 February 2022; 3 years ago
- Ground: Paso da Olaria
- President: Sandro Becker
- League: Campeonato Gaúcho Série A2
- 2024: Gaúcho Série A2, 14th of 16
- Website: https://www.futebolcomvidasaf.com.br/
Home colors	Away colors

Futebol com Vida, is a Brazilian football club based in Viamão, Rio Grande do Sul.

== History ==
With the new SAF law in Brazilian football in 2021, the former footballer Sandro Becker founded the first project of its kind known in Rio Grande do Sul: Futebol com Vida. The club, based in Viamão, also has structures in Três Passos, in addition to working with women's football.

In its first year as a professional club, it was promoted as runner-up in the Campeonato Gaúcho Série B.

== Appearances ==
Following is the summary of Futebol com Vida appearances in Campeonato Gaúcho.

Season	Division	Final position
2023	3rd	2nd
2024	2nd	14th
2025	2nd	Withdrew

== Honours ==
- Campeonato Gaúcho Série B
  - Runners-up (1): 2023
