= Adílio =

Adílio is a Brazilian masculine given name.

People with that name include:

- Adílio (footballer, born 1956) (1956–2024), born Adílio de Oliveira Gonçalves, Brazilian football midfielder and manager
- Adílio (footballer, born 1993), born Adílio Correa dos Santos, Brazilian football forward for Arouca
- Adílio Daronch (1908–1924), Brazilian martyr
- Adílio Martins Viana, Brazilian politician
