= Manuel Gómez González =

Blessed Manuel Gómez González
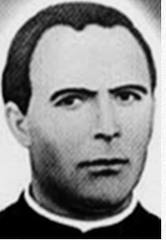

Priest and Martyr
- Born: 29 May 1877; São José de Ribarteme, As Neves, Galicia, Kingdom of Spain
- Died: 21 May 1924 (aged 46); Três Passos, Rio Grande do Sul, Brazil
- Venerated in: Roman Catholic Church (Brazil)
- Beatified: 21 October 2007, Frederico Westphalen, Rio Grande do Sul, Brazil by Cardinal José Saraiva Martins
- Feast: 21 May

Manuel Gómez González (May 29, 1877 – May 21, 1924) was a Spanish missionary priest and a Catholic martyr who lived in Brazil.

== Biography ==
Son of farmers, González was ordained priest on May 24, 1902 in Tui, Galicia, Spain.

In 1904, after exercising his priestly ministry in his native land, he moved to the Archdiocese of Braga, Portugal, where he was parish priest of the parishes of Our Lady of the Extreme (1905-1911) in Vila Pouca de Aguiar, and of St. Andrew of Taias and St. Michael of Baroque (1911–1913) in Monção.

Due to the political persecutions found in the First Portuguese Republic, which were intensifying more and more, he moved to Brazil in 1913, where he went to work in the parish of Soledade, jurisdiction of the Diocese of Santa Maria, Rio Grande do Sul, and on 7 September 1915 in the parish of Nonoai, in the same diocese and state.

His social work in the area included the construction of a pottery shop, a hotel and houses for the homeless of Nonoai. He also introduced new crops in the agriculture of the area. The Brazilian revolution of 1923 made the border region between Uruguay and Brazil very dangerous, with various bands and commandos acting violently for the ownership of lands.

Next to his acolyte Adílio Daronch, González visited the chapels of the region. In one of the routine visits, both the priest and his auxiliary altar boy were tortured and assassinated on May 21, 1924, in the town of Feijão Miúdo, in the current municipality of Três Passos by revolutionaries.

=== Beatification ===
On 14 June 1996 began the process of beatification of González and Daronch who were venerated by the faithful Catholics of the region as martyrs and in December 2006 Pope Benedict XVI recognized the existence of their martyrdom, with which they opened the road to beatification.

On 21 October 2007 they were beatified by mandate of the Pope Benedict XVI in a ceremony presided by Cardinal José Saraiva Martins in Frederico Westphalen, Rio Grande do Sul.

== See also ==
- List of unsolved murders (1900–1979)
