= Júlio Santos =

Brazilian footballer

Personal information
- Full name: Júlio César dos Santos
- Date of birth: 12 December 1981 (age 44)
- Place of birth: Osasco, Brazil
- Height: 1.82 m (6 ft 0 in)
- Position: Centre-back

Team information
- Current team: Centro Esportivo Gramadense

Youth career
- 1999–2000: São Paulo

Senior career*
Years	Team	Apps	(Gls)
2001–2003	São Paulo		
2004–2005	Paysandu		
2005–2006	Goiás		
2007	Vasco da Gama		
2008–2010	Tours		
2011	São Caetano		
2013	Mazembe		
2013	Icasa		
2013	Lajeadense		
2014	Novo Hamburgo		
2014	Caxias		
2015	São Bento		
2016	Batatais		
2016–?	Novo Hamburgo		

International career
2003	Brazil U-23		
- * Club domestic league appearances and goals

Júlio César dos Santos (born 12 December 1981), or simply Júlio Santos, is a Brazilian former professional who played as a centre-back.

== Career ==
Júlio Santos was born in Osasco.

He signed for Tours FC on 20 June 2008. in in for TP Mazembe, after signing in January 2012.

== Honours ==
- 2000 - Campeonato Paulista (São Paulo)
- 2001 - Torneio Rio – São Paulo (São Paulo)
- 2002 - Supercampeonato Paulista (São Paulo)
- 2006 - Campeonato Goiano (Goiás)
- 2017 - Campeonato Gaúcho (Novo Hamburgo)
