= Campeonato Gaúcho Série B =

Football league in Brazil

- Organising body: FGF
- Founded: 1967; 59 years ago
- Country: Brazil
- State: Rio Grande do Sul
- Level on pyramid: 3
- Promotion to: Série A2
- Domestic cup: Copa FGF
- Current champions: Gramadense (1st title) (2024)
- Most championships: Guarany de Bagé (3 titles)
- Website: FGF Official website

The Campeonato Gaúcho Série B is the third tier of the professional state football league in the Brazilian state of Rio Grande do Sul. It is run by the Rio Grande do Sul Football Federation (FGF).

== List of champions ==
Season	Champions	Runners-up
1967	Grêmio Santanense (1)	Ta-Guá
1968	Igrejinha (1)	Elite
1969	Três Passos (1)	Tupi
1970–1979	Not held	
1977	Rosário (1)	Rio Grande
1978	Lajeadense (1)	Botafogo (FV)
1979	Not held	
1980	Igrejinha (2)	Pedro Osório
1981	Rosário (2)	Pradense
1982–1984	Not held	
1985	Guarany (CA) (1)	Rio Grande
1986–1998	Not held	
1999	Guarany de Bagé (1)	Canoas FC
2000	Gaúcho (1)	Grêmio Santanense
2001	Cachoeira (1)	Farroupilha
2002	Ulbra (1)	RS Futebol
2003	Lami (1)	Riograndense (SM)
2004–2011	Not held	
2012	Aimoré (1)	Gaúcho
2013	Tupi (1)	Nova Prata
2014	Rio Grande (1)	Guarani (VA)
2015	Marau (1)	Guarany de Bagé
2016	Guarany de Bagé (2)	Gaúcho
2017	Internacional B (1)	Bagé
2018	São Borja (1)	Farroupilha
2019	Guarany de Bagé (3)	Brasil de Farroupulha
2020	Canceled due to the COVID-19 pandemic in Brazil	
2021	Santa Cruz (1)	Gaúcho
2022	Monsoon (1)	Bagé
2023	Cruzeiro (1)	Futebol com Vida
2024	Gramadense (1)	Real

=== Notes ===
- Ulbra is the currently Canoas SC.
- Lami changed their name to Porto Alegre FC.
- RS Futebol changed their name to Pedrabanca FC.

== Titles by team ==
Teams in bold stills active.

Rank	Club	Winners	Winning years
1	**Guarany de Bagé**	3	1999, 2016, 2019
2	**Igrejinha**	2	1968, 1980
2	Rosário	2	1977, 1981
4	**Aimoré**	1	2012
4	Cachoeira	1	2001
4	Canoas SC	1	2002
4	**Cruzeiro**	1	2023
4	**Gaúcho**	1	2000
4	**Gramadense**	1	2024
4	Grêmio Santanense	1	1967
4	Guarany (CA)	1	1985
4	Internacional B	1	2017
4	**Lajeadense**	1	1978
4	**Marau**	1	2015
4	**Monsoon**	1	2022
4	Porto Alegre	1	2003
4	**Rio Grande**	1	2014
4	**Santa Cruz**	1	2021
4	**São Borja**	1	2018
4	**Três Passos**	1	1969
4	**Tupi**	1	2013

=== By city ===
City	Championships	Clubs
Bagé	3	Guarany de Bagé (3)
Porto Alegre	3	Internacional B (1), Monsoon (1), Porto Alegre (1)
Rosário do Sul	2	Rosário (2)
Igrejinha	2	Igrejinha (2)
Cachoeira do Sul	1	Cachoeira (1)
Cachoeirinha	1	Cruzeiro (1)
Canoas	1	Canoas SC (1)
Crissiumal	1	Tupi (1)
Cruz Alta	1	Guarany (CA) (1)
Gramado	1	Gramadense (1)
Lajeado	1	Lajeadense (1)
Marau	1	Marau (1)
Passo Fundo	1	Gaúcho (1)
Rio Grande	1	Rio Grande (1)
Santa Cruz do Sul	1	Santa Cruz (1)
Santana do Livramento	1	Grêmio Santanense (1)
São Borja	1	São Borja (1)
São Leopoldo	1	Aimoré (1)
Três Passos	1	Três Passos (1)

== See also ==
- Campeonato Gaúcho
- Campeonato Gaúcho Série A2
