= Sandro Becker =

Brazilian footballer (born 1971)

Personal information
- Date of birth: 14 January 1971 (age 55)
- Place of birth: Redentora, Brazil
- Height: 1.81 m (5 ft 11 in)
- Position: Centre-back

Youth career
- –1989: Internacional

Senior career*
| Years | Team | Apps | (Gls) |
| 1989–1992 | Internacional | | |
| 1991 | → Flamengo (loan) | | |
| 1992–1993 | Flamengo | | |
| 1994 | Aimoré | | |
| 1994 | Lajeadense | | |
| 1995–1996 | Uberlândia | | |
| 1996–1997 | FC 08 Homburg | | |
| 1997 | Santo André | | |
| 1998 | Shanghai Shenhua | | |
| 1998 | Inter de Limeira | | |
| 1999–2000 | Malutron | | |
- * Club domestic league appearances and goals

Sandro Becker (born 14 January 1971) is a Brazilian former professional footballer who played as a centre-back.

== Career ==
Sandro Becker was trained in the youth teams of Internacional, the team for which he was two-time state champion and of the Copa do Brasil in 1992. He transferred to Flamengo after a brief loan period, and was again champion, this time as part of the squad. Brazilian Champion. He also played for other clubs in Rio Grande do Sul, São Paulo, Germany, China and Malutron (currently J. Malucelli), where he was part of the team that competed in the Copa João Havelange.

== Futebol com Vida ==
With the new SAF law in Brazilian football in 2021, Sandro Becker founded the first project of its kind known in Rio Grande do Sul: Futebol com Vida, a team that was promoted in its first year as a professional club.

== Honours ==
Internacional

- Campeonato Gaúcho: 1991, 1992
- Copa do Brasil: 1992

Flamengo

- Campeonato Brasileiro: 1992
- Copa Rio: 1991

Shanghai Shenhua

- Chinese FA Cup: 1998

J. Malucelli

- Copa João Havelange Group Green and White: 2000
