= Gardellini =

Gardellini is an Italian surname of likely Occitan origin. Notable people with the name include:

- Carlos Gardellini, member of the Argentine band Vox Dei
- Aloisio Gardellini (1759–1829), Italian editor of religious texts

== See also ==
- Gardel (disambiguation)
- Gardell
- Gardella
- Gardelle
- Gardelli
