= Waldemar Grazziotin Municipal Stadium =

Football stadium in Antônio Prado, Brazil

Waldemar Grazziotin
- Interactive map of Waldemar Grazziotin
- Full name: Waldemar Grazziotin Municipal Stadium
- Address: Antônio Prado, Rio Grande do Sul; Brazil
- Coordinates: 28°51′16″S 51°16′37″W

Construction
- Opened: 16 August 1951; 75 years ago

Tenant
- Municipal government (1951–present)

The Waldemar Grazziotin Municipal Stadium is a football stadium located in the Brazilian city of Antônio Prado, in the state of Rio Grande do Sul. It seats 2,300 people.

It was first used by Pradense and then hosted friendlies for other clubs with SER Caxias.
