= Gardel (footballer) =

Brazilian footballer

Personal information
- Full name: Carlos Gardel Bruno
- Date of birth: 1 July 1955
- Place of birth: Vitória, Brazil
- Date of death: 19 June 2009 (aged 53)
- Place of death: Vila Velha, Brazil
- Position: Centre-back

Youth career
- Vasco da Gama

Senior career*
Years	Team	Apps	(Gls)
1975	Vasco da Gama		
1975–1976	Atlântico-RS		
1976–1978	Internacional		
1978–1985	Coritiba		
1981	→ Internacional (loan)		
1981–1982	→ Barcelona SC (loan)		
1984	→ Grêmio Maringá (loan)		
1984	→ Inter de Limeira (loan)		
1985–1986	Criciúma		
- * Club domestic league appearances and goals as of 25 May 2024

Carlos Gardel Bruno (1 July 1955 – 19 June 2009), simply known as Gardel, was a Brazilian professional footballer who played as a centre-back.

== Career ==
Revealed in the youth sectors of CR Vasco da Gama, he had few opportunities in the first team. He ended up taken to Rio Grande do Sul by the director Heleno Nunes, and ended up agreeing with Atlântico de Erechim. Due to a great performance in a match against SC Internacional, he was hired by the club, and was part of the 1976 state and Brazilian champion squad. After losing space, he arrived at Coritiba in 1978 and became an idol of the club. Gardel was twice state champion and played for the club until 1985, being part of the beginning of the Brazilian title campaign that year. He had a loan spell at Barcelona SC in 1981 and was champion in Ecuador, and in 1986 he ended his career at Criciúma, becoming champion again.

== Honours ==
Internacional

- Campeonato Brasileiro: 1976
- Campeonato Gaúcho: 1976

Coritiba

- Campeonato Brasileiro: 1985
- Campeonato Paranaense: 1978, 1979

Barcelona SC

- Ecuadorian Serie A: 1981

Criciúma

- Campeonato Catarinense: 1986

== Death ==
Gardel died on 19 June 2009, aged 53, from a heart attack.
