= Gardelle =

Gardelle is a French surname. Notable people with the surname include:

- Camille Gardelle (1866–1947), French architect
- Robert Gardelle (1682–1766), Swiss artist
- Théodore Gardelle (1722–1761), Swiss painter and enameler
- Yvonne Gardelle (1897–1979), American actress and artist's model

== See also ==
- Gardel (disambiguation)
- Gardell
- Gardella
- Gardelli
- Gardellini
