= Gardella =

Gardella is an Italian surname of likely Occitan origin. Notable people with the surname include:

- Al Gardella (1918–2006), American baseball player
- Danny Gardella (1920–2005), American baseball player
- Gus Gardella (1895–1974), American football player
- Ignazio Gardella (1905–1999), Italian architect and designer
- Kay Gardella (1923–2005), American journalist
- Tess Gardella (1894–1950), Italian-American performer

== See also ==
- The Gardella Vampire Chronicles, a series of novels by Colleen Gleason
- Gardel (disambiguation)
- Gardell
- Gardelle
- Gardelli
- Gardellini
