= Gardell =

Gardell is a Swedish surname. Notable people with the surname include:

- Anna Gardell-Ericson (1853–1939), Swedish artist
- Billy Gardell (born 1969), American actor and comedian
- Christer Gardell (born 1960), Swedish venture capitalist
- Jonas Gardell (born 1963), Swedish novelist, playwright, screenwriter and comedian
- Mattias Gardell (born 1959), Swedish scholar of comparative religion
- Stina Gardell (born 1990), Swedish Olympic swimmer

== See also ==
- Gardel (disambiguation)
- Gardella
- Gardelle
- Gardelli
- Gardellini
