= 2017 Campeonato Gaúcho =

Campeonato Gaúcho
- Season: 2017
- Champions: Novo Hamburgo
- Relegated: Ypiranga; Passo Fundo

The 2017 Campeonato da Primeira Divisão de Futebol Profissional da FGF, better known as the 2017 Campeonato Gaúcho, was the 97th season of Rio Grande do Sul's top-flight football league. The season began in January and ends in May.

== Participating teams ==
Club	Home city
Brasil de Pelotas	Pelotas
Caxias	Caxias do Sul
Cruzeiro	Porto Alegre
Grêmio	Porto Alegre
Internacional	Porto Alegre
Juventude	Caxias do Sul
Novo Hamburgo	Novo Hamburgo
Passo Fundo	Passo Fundo
São José-PA	Porto Alegre
São Paulo	Rio Grande
Veranópolis	Veranópolis
Ypiranga	Erechim

== First phase ==
Pos	Team	Pld	W	D	L	GF	GA	GD	Pts	Qualification or relegation
1	Novo Hamburgo	11	7	2	2	19	9	+10	23	Play-offs
2	Cruzeiro	11	5	5	1	13	9	+4	20	Play-offs
3	Caxias	11	5	4	2	16	10	+6	19	Play-offs
4	Grêmio	11	4	5	2	16	9	+7	17	Play-offs
5	Veranópolis	11	3	6	2	9	8	+1	15	Play-offs
6	Juventude	11	4	2	5	8	14	−6	14	Play-offs
7	Internacional	11	3	5	3	13	13	0	14	Play-offs
8	São José-PA	11	3	4	4	11	11	0	13	Play-offs
9	São Paulo	11	3	3	5	11	16	−5	12	
10	Brasil de Pelotas	11	2	4	5	9	11	−2	10	
11	Ypiranga	11	2	3	6	7	14	−7	9	Relegation to the 2018 Campeonato Gaúcho Série B
12	Passo Fundo	11	1	3	7	7	16	−9	6	Relegation to the 2018 Campeonato Gaúcho Série B

Updated to match(es) played on 4 May 2017. Source: Standings
Rules for classification: 1) points; 2) goal difference; 3) number of goals scored.

== Knockout stage ==
=== Bracket ===
Quarterfinals
1	Novo Hamburgo	1	1	2
8	São José-PA	0	0	0
5	Grêmio	2	5	7
4	Veranópolis	0	0	0
3	Caxias	1	1	2
6	Juventude	0	0	0
7	Cruzeiro	1	0	1
2	Internacional	3	2	5

Semifinals
Novo Hamburgo	1	1	2 (7)
Grêmio	1	1	2 (6)
Caxias	0	1	1 (3)
Internacional	1	0	1 (5)

Finals
Novo Hamburgo	2	1	3 (3)
Internacional	2	1	3 (1)

=== Final ===
2017 Campeonato Gaúcho
30 April 2017
16:00
Final

Internacional	2–2	Novo Hamburgo
Júlio Santos 53' (o.g.); Nico López 83'		17' João Paulo; 67' Assis

Beira Rio, Porto Alegre
Attendance: 38,226
Referee: Anderson Daronco
7 May 2017
16:00

Novo Hamburgo	1 – 1	Internacional
Ernando 21' (o.g.)		48' Dourado
Penalties
João Paulo (penalty scored); Léo (penalty missed); Júlio Santos (penalty scored); Pablo (penalty scored)	3 – 1	(penalty missed) D'Alessandro; (penalty missed) Víctor Cuesta; (penalty missed) Nico López; (penalty scored) William

Centenário, Caxias do Sul
Referee: Leandro Pedro Vuaden

== Awards ==
=== Team of the year ===
Pos.	Player	Club
GK	(Brazil) Matheus Cavichioli	Novo Hamburgo
DF	(Brazil) John Lennon	Cruzeiro
DF	(Brazil) Júlio Santos	Novo Hamburgo
DF	(Brazil) Pedro Geromel	Grêmio
DF	(Brazil) Sander	Cruzeiro
MF	(Brazil) Rodrigo Dourado	Internacional
MF	(Brazil) Jardel	Novo Hamburgo
MF	(Brazil) Preto	Novo Hamburgo
MF	(Argentina) Andrés D'Alessandro	Internacional
FW	(Ecuador) Miller Bolaños	Grêmio
FW	(Argentina) Nico López	Internacional
MAN	(Brazil) Beto Campos	Novo Hamburgo

Source Informativo
Last updated: 14 May 2017

Player of the Season

The Player of the Year was awarded to Matheus.

Newcomer of the Season

The Newcomer of the Year was awarded to Sander.

Top scorer of the Season

The top scorer of the season was Brenner and Miller Bolaños, who scored seven goals each.
