= João Paulo (footballer, born June 1985) =

Brazilian footballer

Personal information
- Full name: João Paulo de Oliveira
- Date of birth: 13 June 1985 (age 41)
- Place of birth: Rio de Janeiro (RJ), Brazil
- Height: 1.84 m (6 ft 0 in)
- Position: Striker

Team information
- Current team: Caxias

Senior career*
Years	Team	Apps	(Gls)
2003	Brasil de Pelotas	-	(-)
2004	Madureira	-	(-)
2004	Germinal Beerschot	11	(0)
2005	Bornem	10	(0)
2006	Juventude	6	(0)
2007	Glória	2	(0)
2007–2010	Os Belenenses	29	(3)
2009	→ Olhanense (loan)	14	(3)
2010	→ Veranópolis (loan)	16	(6)
2011	Pelotas	10	(4)
2011	Linense	0	(0)
2012	Chapecoense	0	(0)
2012	Guaratinguetá	11	(1)
2013	Passo Fundo	16	(4)
2014	Linense	7	(2)
2014	Penapolense	7	(3)
2015	Novorizontino	13	(2)
2017	Novo Hamburgo		
2017	Juventude		
2017–	Caxias		
- * Club domestic league appearances and goals as of 8 May 2017

João Paulo de Oliveira (born 13 June 1985 in Rio de Janeiro, Brazil) is a Brazilian footballer currently playing for Novorizontino.

He has played for Brasil de Pelotas, Madureira, Glória, Juventude in Brazil, Germinal and Bornem in the Belgian second division as well.

== Honours ==
Olhanense

- Liga de Honra: 2008-09

Grêmio Novorizontino

- Campeonato Paulista Série A2: 2015

Novo Hamburgo

- Campeonato Gaúcho: 2017
