= Beto Campos =

Brazilian football manager (1964–2018)

Personal information
- Full name: Gilberto Cirilo de Campos
- Date of birth: 6 July 1964
- Place of birth: São Borja, Brazil
- Date of death: 23 July 2018 (aged 54)
- Place of death: Santa Cruz do Sul, Brazil

Managerial career
- Years: Team
- 2008: Pelotas
- 2009: Avenida
- 2010: Pelotas
- 2010: São Paulo-RS
- 2011: Avenida
- 2012: Cruzeiro-RS
- 2012: Santo Ângelo
- 2013: Cruzeiro-RS
- 2013: Passo Fundo
- 2013–2014: São José-RS
- 2014: Caxias
- 2015: Passo Fundo
- 2015–2016: Caxias
- 2017: Novo Hamburgo
- 2017: Náutico
- 2017: Criciúma
- 2018: Novo Hamburgo

Gilberto Cirilo de Campos (6 July 1964 – 23 July 2018), commonly known as Beto Campos, was a Brazilian football manager.

== Managerial statistics ==
Team	From	To	Record				
Team	From	To	G	W	D	L	Win %
Novo Hamburgo	2017		17	9	6	2	52.94
Total			17	9	6	2	52.94

== Honours ==
Avenida

- Campeonato Gaúcho Série B: 2011

Caxias

- Campeonato Gaúcho Série B: 2016

Novo Hamburgo

- Campeonato Gaúcho: 2017

=== Individual ===
- Campeonato Gaúcho Coach of the Year: 2017
