= Gardelli =

Gardelli is an Italian surname of likely Occitan origin. Notable people with the name include:

- Giovanna Gardelli (born 1989), known as Marianne Mirage, Italian singer-songwriter
- Lamberto Gardelli (1915–1998), Italian-Swedish conductor
- Mário Gardelli (1908–?), Brazilian football referee

== See also ==
- Gardel (disambiguation)
- Gardell
- Gardella
- Gardelle
- Gardellini
