= Esporte Clube Igrejinha =

Igrejinha
- Full name: Esporte Clube Igrejinha
- Nickname: Tricolor do Paranhana
- Founded: April 26, 1930
- Ground: Estádio Alberto Carlos Schwingler
- Capacity: 3,000
Home colours	Away colours

Esporte Clube Igrejinha, commonly referred to as Igrejinha, is a Brazilian football club based in Igrejinha, Rio Grande do Sul. It currently plays in Campeonato Gaúcho Série A2, the second level of the Rio Grande do Sul state football league.

== History ==
The club was founded on April 26, 1930. They won the Campeonato Gaúcho Third Level in 1968 and in 1980.

== Honours ==
- Campeonato Gaúcho Série B
  - Winners (2): 1968, 1980

== Stadium ==
Esporte Clube Igrejinha play their home games at Estádio Carlos Alberto Schwingler. The stadium has a maximum capacity of 3,000 people.
