= Tazehabad-e Gardel Gari =

Tazehabad-e Gardel Gari تازه ابادگردل گاري
- Village
- Location within Iran
- Coordinates: 34°44′19″N 46°08′59″E
- Country: Iran
- Province: Kermanshah
- County: Salas-e Babajani
- Bakhsh: Ozgoleh
- Rural District: Ozgoleh

Population (2006)
  - Total: 75
- Time zone: UTC+3:30 (IRST)
  - Summer (DST): UTC+4:30 (IRDT)

Tazehabad-e Gardel Gari (Persian: تازه ابادگردل گاري, also Romanized as Tāzehābād-e Gardel Gārī; also known as Tāzehābād) is a village in Ozgoleh Rural District, Ozgoleh District, Salas-e Babajani County, Kermanshah Province, Iran. At the 2006 census, its population was 75, in 17 families.
