= Braga, Rio Grande do Sul =

Municipality of Rio Grande do Sul, Brazil

Coordinates: 27°36′50″S 53°44′20″W

Braga
- Municipality
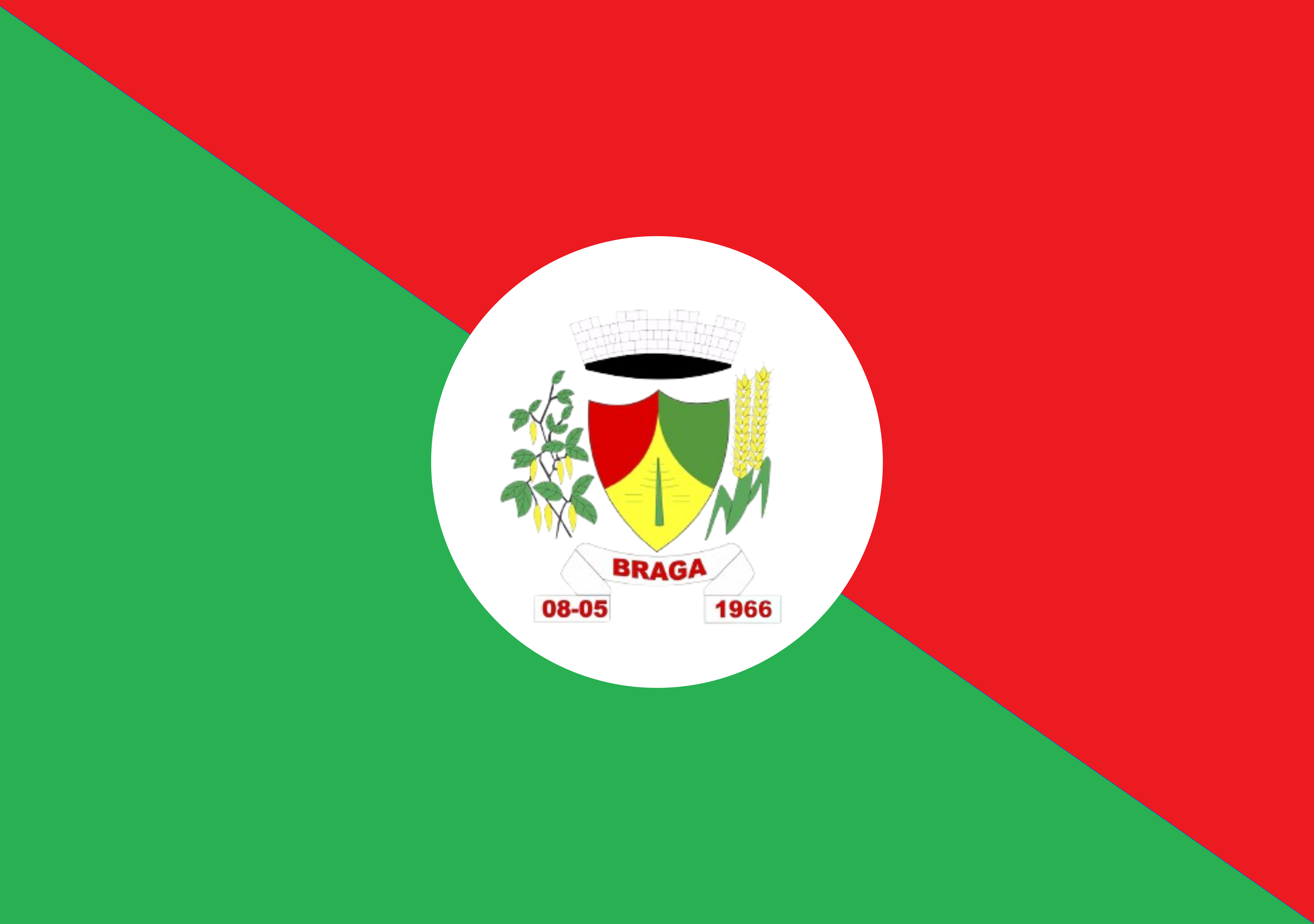
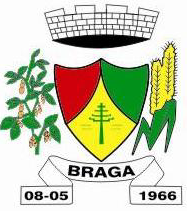
- Flag Coat of arms
- Motto: "Terra da hospitalidade"
- Location of Braga in Rio Grande do Sul
- Country: Brazil
- Region: South
- State: Rio Grande do Sul
- Mesoregion: Noroeste Rio-Grandense
- Microregion: Três Passos
- Founded: 15 December 1965

Government
  - Mayor: Luís Carlos Balestrin (MDB, 2021 - 2024)

Area
  - Total: 132.044 km^{2} (50.982 sq mi)

Population (2021)
  - Total: 3,271
  - Density: 24.77/km^{2} (64.16/sq mi)
- Demonym: Braguense
- Time zone: UTC−3 (BRT)
- Website: Official website

Braga is a municipality in the state of Rio Grande do Sul, Brazil. As of 2022, the estimated population was 3,268.

== See also ==
- List of municipalities in Rio Grande do Sul
