= Conceição do Tocantins =

Municipality in Tocantins, Brazil

- Municipality
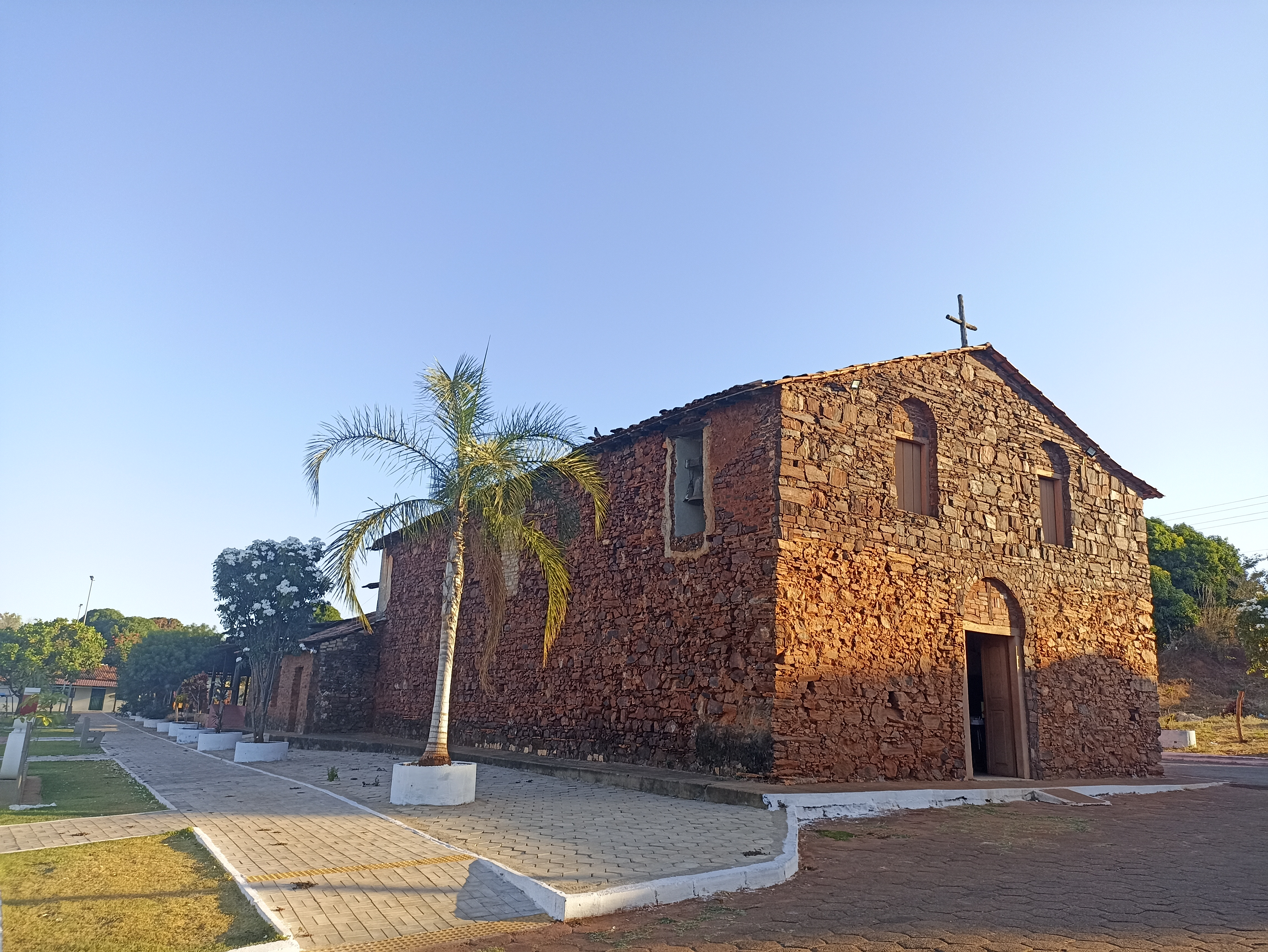

- Location in Tocantins state

- Location in Brazil
- Coordinates: 12°13′08″S 47°17′52″W
- Country: Brazil
- Region: North
- State: Tocantins

Area
  - Total: 2,501 km^{2} (966 sq mi)

Population (2020)
  - Total: 4,087
  - Density: 1.634/km^{2} (4.232/sq mi)
- Time zone: UTC−3 (BRT)

Conceição do Tocantins is a municipality located in the Brazilian state of Tocantins. Its population was 4,087 (2020) and its area is 2,501 km^{2}. Geographically, the city is located about 400 meters above sea level in the Tocantins-Araguaia river basin. It has a warm tropical climate with a clear rainy season. The area is also one of the least populated parts of the state, with a population density of about 1.5 people per square kilometer.

== See also ==
- List of municipalities in Tocantins
