= Santo Augusto =

Municipality in Rio Grande do Sul, Brazil

Coordinates: 27°51′S 53°47′W

- Municipality
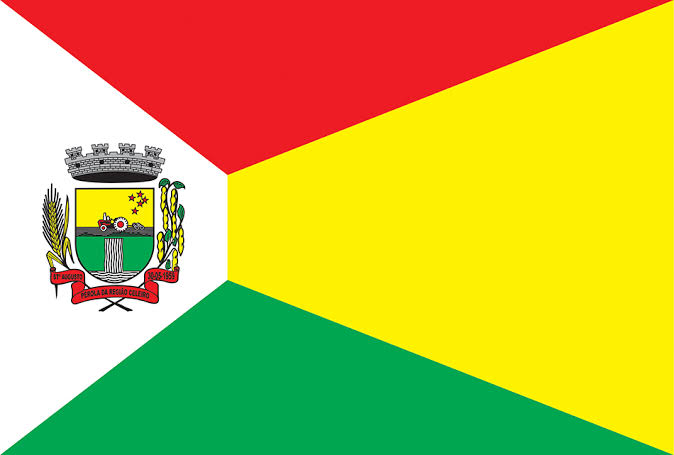
- Flag Coat of arms
- Interactive map of Santo Augusto
- Country: Brazil
- Time zone: UTC−3 (BRT)

Santo Augusto is a municipality in the state of Rio Grande do Sul, Brazil, in the micro region of Ijuí. As of 2020, the estimated population was 13,848.

== See also ==
- List of municipalities in Rio Grande do Sul
