= Centro Esportivo Gramadense =

Gramadense
- Full name: Centro Esportivo Gramadense
- Nickname: Trem da Serra
- Founded: 22 December 1929; 96 years ago
- President: Sandro Bazzan
- Head coach: Gustavo Corrêa
- League: Campeonato Gaúcho Série A2
- 2025: Gaúcho Série A2, 6th of 15
Home colours	Away colours	Third colours

Centro Esportivo Gramadense, commonly known as Gramadense, is a Brazilian football team based in Gramado, Rio Grande do Sul. Founded in 1929, they won the Campeonato Gaúcho Série B and the Copa FGF once.

== History ==
Founded on 22 December 1929, Gramadense played amateur competitions during the most of their history, before focusing on youth football in the 2000s. In 2022, the club started a senior professional side, playing in the Campeonato Gaúcho Série B.

In December 2024, Gramadense achieved promotion to the Campeonato Gaúcho Série A2 as champions, defeating Real SC in the finals. On 23 July 2026, the club lifted the Copa FGF after defeating Brasil de Pelotas in the finals, and qualified to the Campeonato Brasileiro Série D for the first time in their history.

== Honours ==
- Copa FGF
  - Winners (1): 2026
- Campeonato Gaúcho Série B
  - Winners (1): 2024
