= Trombudo Central =

- Municipality
- Flag Coat of arms

- Location of Trombudo Central

- Location in Brazil
- Country: Brazil
- Region: South
- State: Santa Catarina
- Mesoregion: Vale do Itajai

Government
  - mayor: Geovana Gessner

Area
  - Total: 39.690 sq mi (102.796 km^{2})
- Elevation: 1,150 ft (350 m)

Population (2020)
  - Total: 7,434
  - Density: 187.3/sq mi (72.32/km^{2})
- Time zone: UTC -3
- Website: www.trombudocentral.sc.gov.br

Trombudo Central is a municipality in the state of Santa Catarina in the South region of Brazil.

== See also ==
- List of municipalities in Santa Catarina
