= Nonoai =

Municipality in Rio Grande do Sul, Brazil

Coordinates: 27.0958°S 52.6178°W

- Municipality
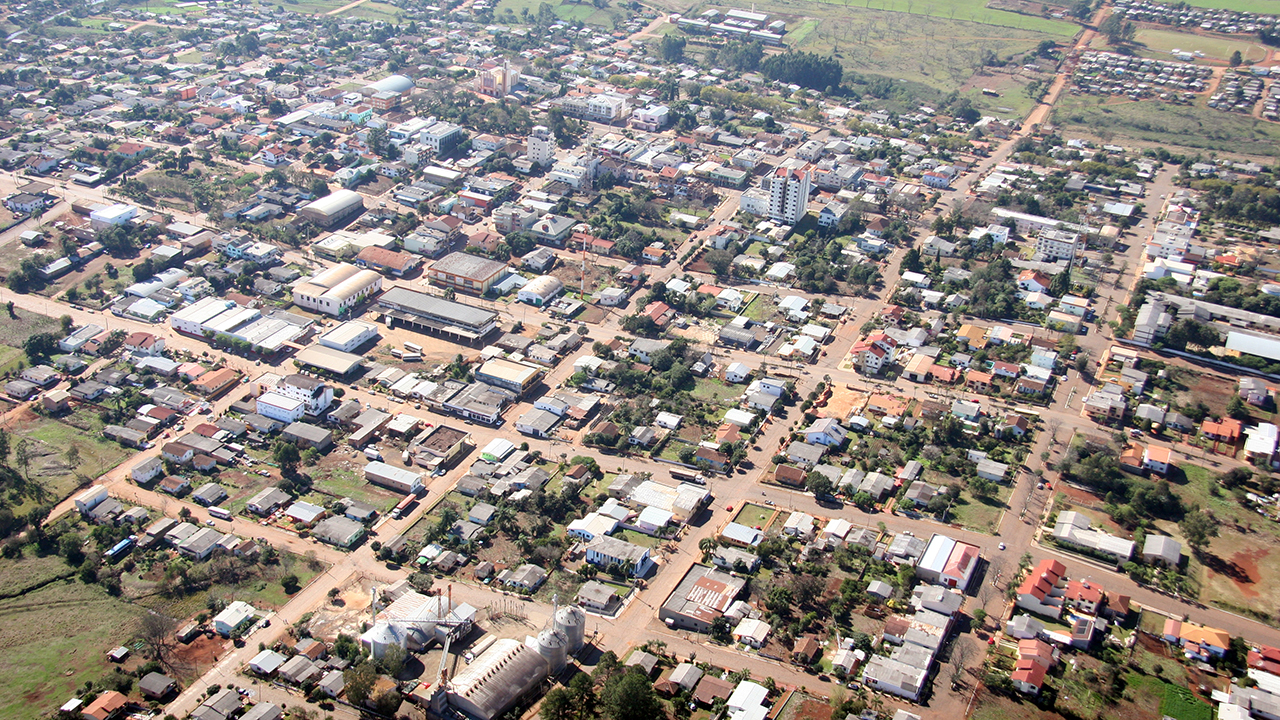

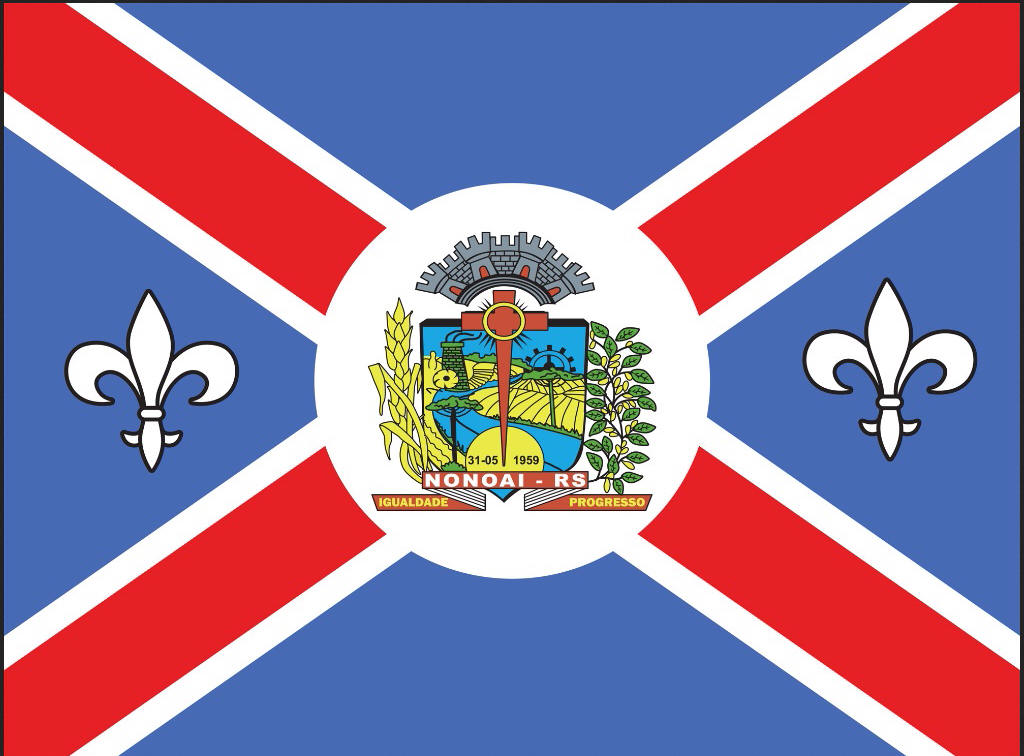
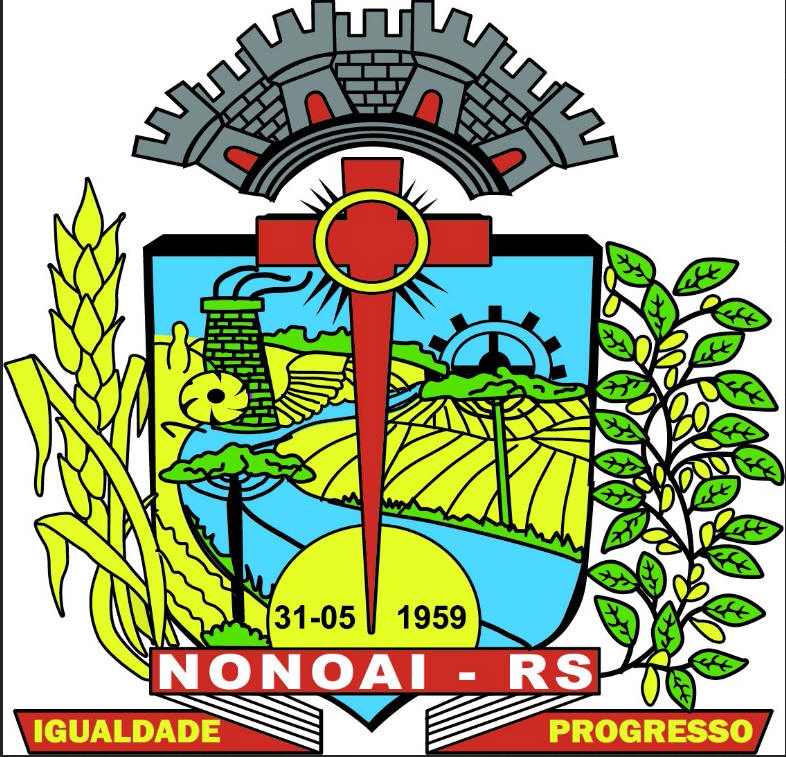
- Flag Coat of arms
- Interactive map of Nonoai
- Country: Brazil
- Time zone: UTC−3 (BRT)

Nonoai is a municipality in the state of Rio Grande do Sul, Brazil. As of 2020, the estimated population was 11,633.

== See also ==
- List of municipalities in Rio Grande do Sul
