= Clube Atlético Pradense =

C.A. Pradense
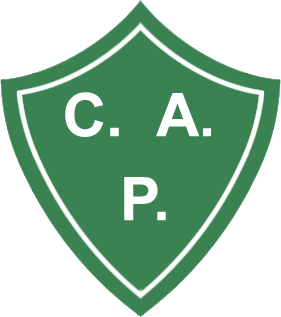
- Full name: Clube Atlético Pradense
- Nickname(s): "Leão da Serra"
- Founded: 6 June 1911; 113 years ago
- Dissolved: 2000
- Stadium: Estádio Municipal Waldemar Grazziotin
- Capacity: 2,300
- Chairman: Samuel Rodrigues
- Manager: Samuel Rodrigues
Home colours	Away colours

Clube Atlético Pradense is a Brazilian football team from the city of Antônio Prado, in the state of Rio Grande do Sul. It was founded on 6 June 1918. Atlético Pradense is one of the biggest football clubs in Serra Gaúcha, having won the Campeonato Gaúcho from the 3rd division, in 1981. Known as the Leão da Serra, its colors are green and white.

Their uniform is very similar to that of Juventude, from Caxias do Sul. Their games are held at the Waldemar Grazziotin Municipal Stadium, with a capacity for 2,300 people. The club has been inactive since 2000 due to lack of resources, but returned to the field in 2012 to compete in the Copa RS and the 2nd division of Gauchão. In recent years, a sponsorship agreement has been signed with businessman and artist Gabriel, Pensador, which has helped a lot in Pradense's return to the football scene.

== Honours ==
=== state ===
- Campeonato Gaúcho – 3rd Division: 1981.
