= Igrejinha =

Municipality of Rio Grande do Sul, Brazil

Município de Igrejinha
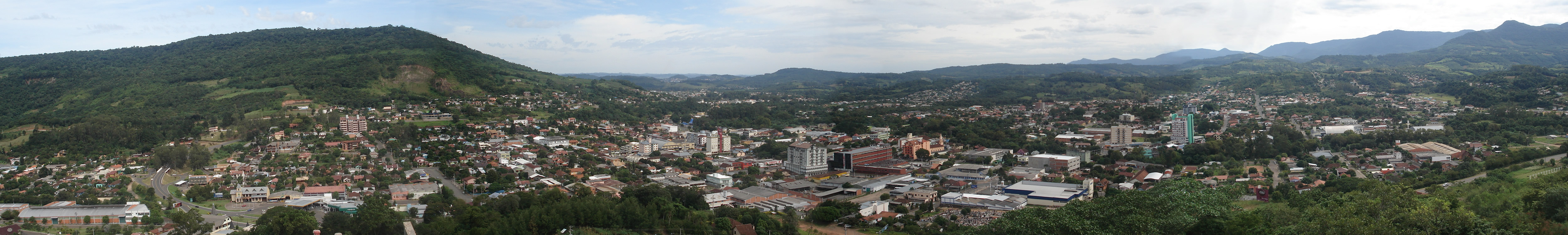

- Flag Coat of arms

- Location in Rio Grande do Sul, Brazil
- Coordinates: 29°34′26″S 50°47′24″W
- Country: Brazil
- Region: South
- State: Rio Grande do Sul
- Emanciped: 1964-06-01

Government
  - Mayor: Joel Leandro Wilhelm (PP)

Area
  - Total: 136.816 km^{2} (52.825 sq mi)
- Elevation: 18 m (59 ft)

Population (2020)
  - Total: 37,340
  - Density: 229.4/km^{2} (594/sq mi)
- Time zone: UTC−3 (BRT)
- Website: igrejinha.rs.gov.br

Igrejinha (Portuguese pronunciation: [igɾe'ʒiɲɐ] — little church in Portuguese) is a municipality located in the metropolitan area of Porto Alegre, in the state of Rio Grande do Sul, Brazil. Home to the Morro Alto da Pedra and the regional park Parque Alto da Pedra. The city has approximately 37,000 inhabitants and sits about 82 km (about 51 miles) from the capital city of the state, Porto Alegre.

== Oktoberfest ==
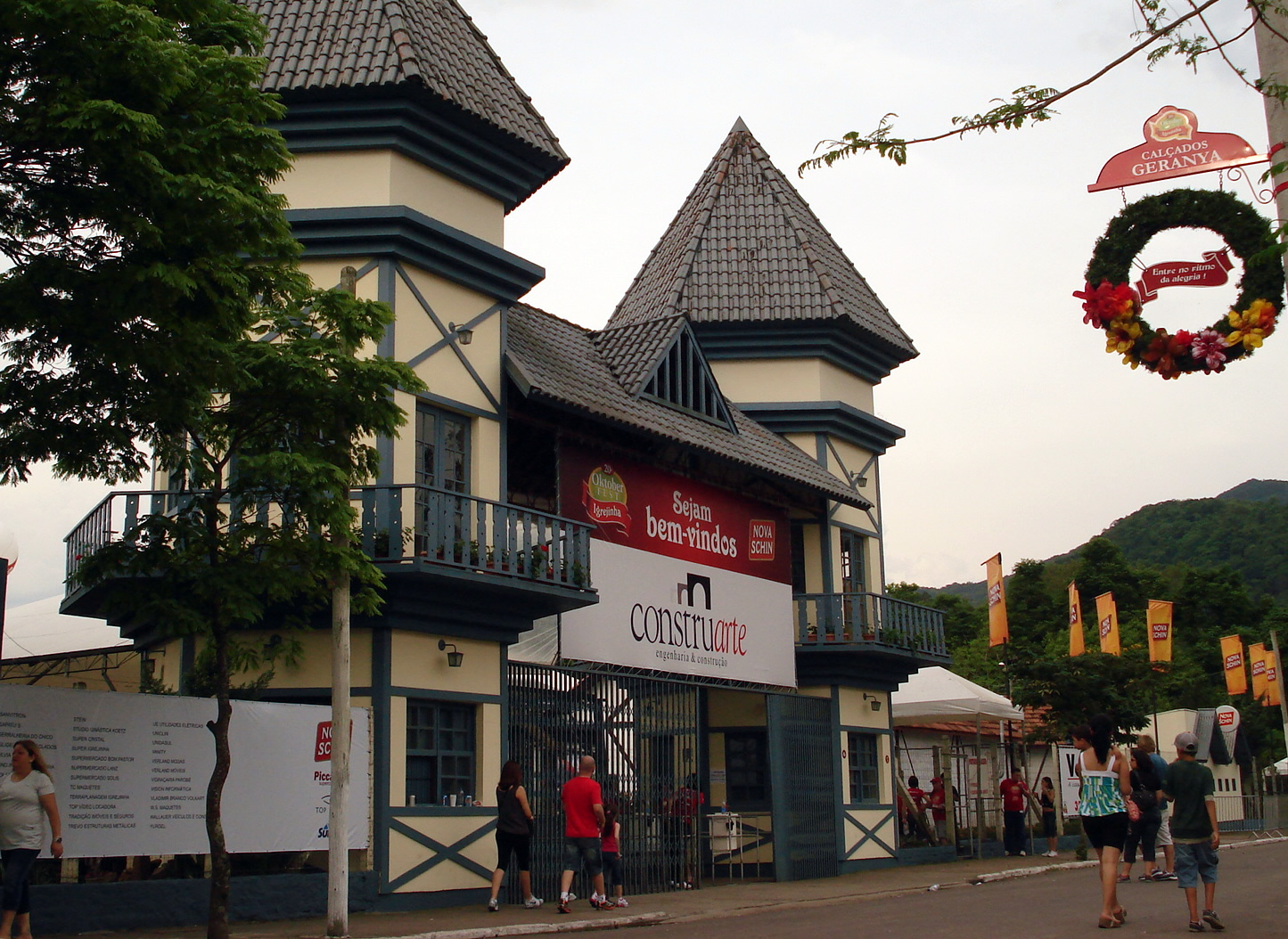
Igrejinha Oktoberfest 2007

Each year, the citizens of Igrejinha and visitors from the region celebrate Oktoberfest. The city has a large population of German-Brazilians. Thousands turn out each year for the Oktoberfest celebration.

The most significant period for tourism is during Oktoberfest, a traditional Bavarian beer festival, which sold 186,000 tickets at its pavilions in 2005—at which 209,561 liters of beer were drunk.

== Town partnership ==
- Simmern, Rhineland-Palatinate, Germany

== Gallery ==
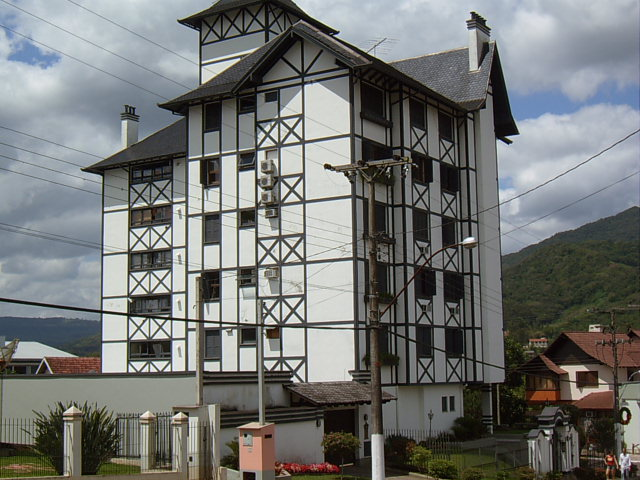
Building

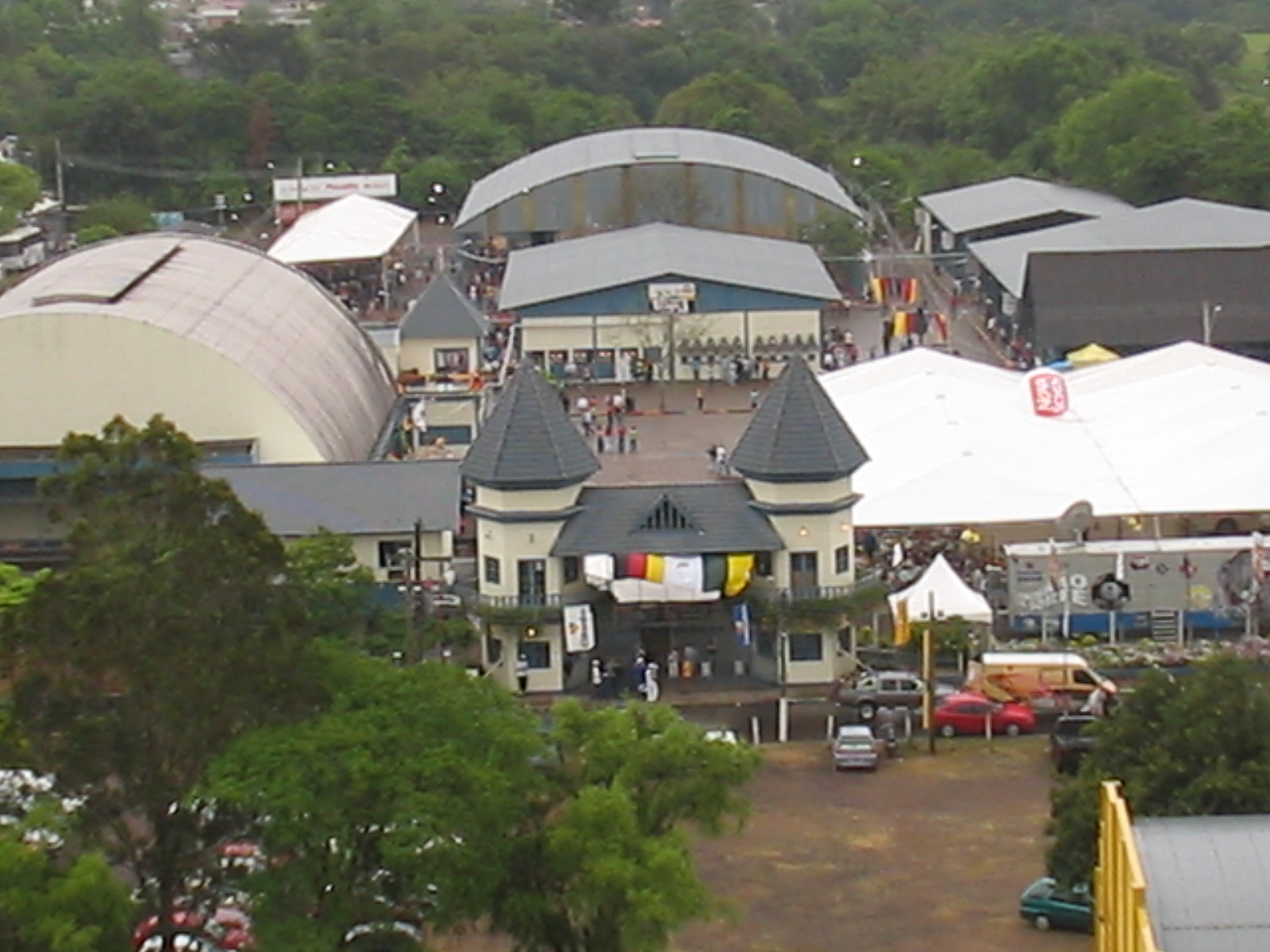
Oktoberfest

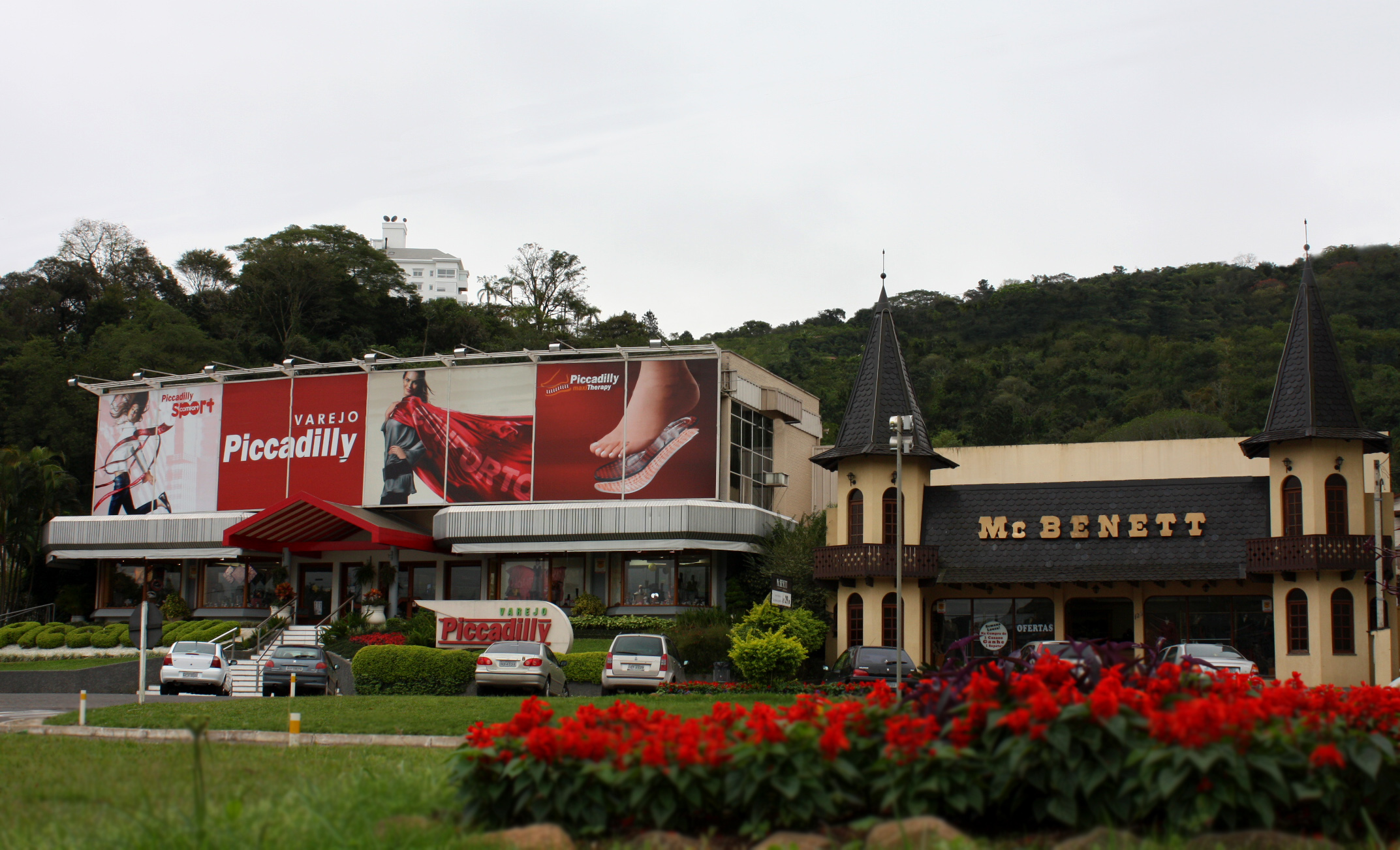
Route RS 115

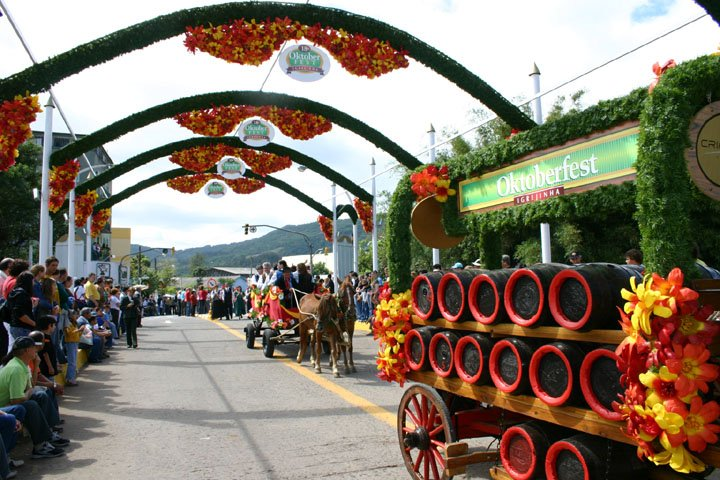
Oktoberfest

== See also ==
- List of municipalities in Rio Grande do Sul
