= Associação Nova Prata de Esportes Cultura e Lazer =

Nova Prata
- Full name: Associação Nova Prata de Esportes Cultura e Lazer
- Nickname(s): Associação; Tricolor Pratense
- Founded: March 8, 2003
- Ground: Estádio Mário Cini, Nova Prata, Rio Grande do Sul state, Brazil
- Capacity: 6,000
- Head coach: Ademir Troitinho
Home colors	Away colors

Associação Nova Prata de Esportes Cultura e Lazer, commonly known as Associação Nova Prata, or just as Nova Prata, is a Brazilian football club based in Nova Prata, Rio Grande do Sul state.

== History ==
The club was founded on April 10, 2003. The club won the Campeonato Municipal de Nova Prata in 2008. In 2009 and 2010 they participated in the Campeonato Estadual Amador. They competed in the 2011 edition of the Copa FGF. Nova Prata competed in the Campeonato Gaúcho Third Division in 2012.

== Honours ==
=== State ===
- Campeonato Gaúcho Série B
  - Runners-up (1): 2013

=== City ===
- Campeonato Municipal de Nova Prata
  - Winners (1): 2008

== Stadium ==
Associação Nova Prata de Esportes Cultura e Lazer play their home games at Estádio Municipal Dr. Mário Cini. The stadium has a maximum capacity of 6,000 people.
