= Três Passos Atlético Clube =

Três Passos
- Full name: Três Passos Atlético Clube
- Nickname(s): TAC
- Founded: February 9, 1966
- Ground: Estádio Municipal Elias de Medeiros, Três Passos, Rio Grande do Sul state, Brazil
- Capacity: 3,000
Home colours	Away colours

Três Passos Atlético Clube, commonly known as Três Passos, is a Brazilian football club based in Três Passos, Rio Grande do Sul state.

== History ==
The club was founded on February 9, 1966. They won the Campeonato Gaúcho Third Level in 1969, beating Tupy.

== Honours ==
- Campeonato Gaúcho Série B
  - Winners (1): 1969

== Stadium ==
Três Passos Atlético Clube play their home games at Estádio Municipal Elias de Medeiros. The stadium has a maximum capacity of 3,000 people.
