= Esporte Clube Novo Hamburgo =

Brazilian football club

Novo Hamburgo
- Full name: Esporte Clube Novo Hamburgo
- Nicknames: Nóia; Anilado; Floriano
- Founded: 1 May 1911; 115 years ago
- Ground: Estádio do Vale
- Capacity: 5,196
- President: Rosalvo Antônio Johann
- Head coach: Julinho Camargo
- League: Campeonato Gaúcho
- 2025: Gaúcho Série A2, 1st of 15 (champions)
- Website: www.ecnh.com.br
| Home colors | Away colors | Third colors |

Esporte Clube Novo Hamburgo, commonly referred to as Novo Hamburgo, is a Brazilian football club based in Novo Hamburgo, Rio Grande do Sul. It currently plays in Campeonato Gaúcho Série A, the first level of the Rio Grande do Sul state football league.

Novo Hamburgo plays home games at the Estádio do Vale, which has a maximum capacity of 5,196.

== History ==
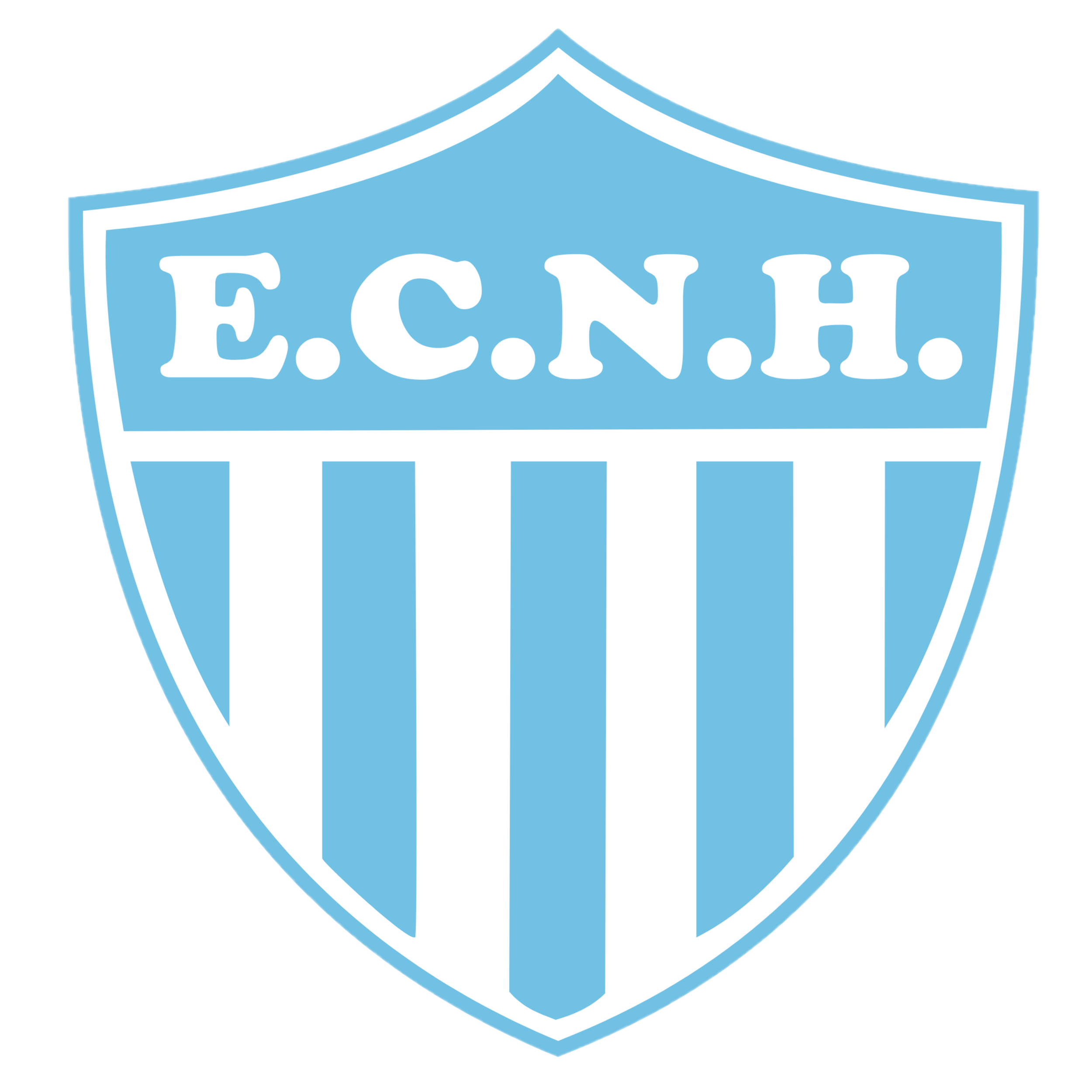
Logo used until 2017

On 1 May 1911, employees of Adams Footwear Factory founded an association. In that day, during the celebrations of the Worker's Day, as it used to happen every year, took place a social gathering event between the employers and employees of the factory. After the barbecue ended, they always played football. Manoel Lopes Mattos, João Scherer, Aloys Auschild, Manoel Outeiro, João Tamujo and Adão Steigleder decided to found a football club. The suggested name was Adams Futebol Clube, but the name they chose was Sport Club Novo Hamburgo, later renamed to Esporte Clube Novo Hamburgo (German: Sport Club Neu-Hamburg).

As Brazil entered World War II in 1944 war joining the allies side, Novo Hamburgo had to change its name, as it was of German origin – Novo Hamburgo means New Hamburg. The city was renamed to Marechal Floriano Peixoto and the club turned into Esporte Clube Floriano. In 1968, the club reverted to its previous name.

Despite that, the 1940s and 50s were a golden age for the team, being the Campeonato Gaúcho runner-ups on 1942, 1947, 1949, 1950 and 1952.

The famous player Garrincha, who won the 1958 and the 1962 World Cups, played once for Novo Hamburgo. On 2 July 1969, he wore the number 7 of the club. The friendly match, played at Beira-Rio stadium ended 3–1 in favour of Internacional. He played the whole first half, and the first 15 minutes of the second one.

Novo Hamburgo was champion of the Campeonato Gaúcho Divisão de Acesso twice in 1996 and 2000. As well the champion of the local state cup Copa FGF in 2013.

The club also has some participations in national competitions. It played once at the Brasileirão on the 1979 season, at the time, the championship was formed by a single division and had 80 teams, with 8 groups of 10 teams. Novo Hamburgo finished in 7th of Group A and 74th in the overall ranking of the championship. The best result was finishing in 4th at the 2005 Campeonato Brasileiro Série C. However, at that time the regulations were that only the top two teams would be promoted for next year's Série B, and thus Novo Hamburgo wasn't promoted.

=== Campeonato Gaúcho 2017 ===
In 2017, Novo Hamburgo conquered its greatest title: the 2017 Campeonato Gaúcho. The club started the season with an extremely well campaign, the team organized by head coach Beto Campos was able to win seven games of the first round and have only two losses, finishing in first in the table, ahead of traditional powerhouses like Grêmio and Internacional. At the playoffs, Novo Hamburgo defeated São José at the quarterfinals with victories in both legs. The team met Grêmio in the semi-finals, tying both games and winning at the penalties. The finals were against Internacional, in the first leg at the Beira Rio, the match ended with a 2 × 2 tie, the championship was decided in a neutral field at the Estádio Centenário in Caxias do Sul; the match again ended in a tie and Novo Hamburgo won in the penalties with a 3 × 1 score. It was the first time a team outside the Grenal duo to win the title since Caxias in 2000, and it was a remarkable underdog victory.

The club played at the state supercup Recopa Gaúcha in 2018 against 2017 Copa FGF champions São José. Novo Hamburgo lost both away and home games.

== Rivals ==
Novo Hamburgo's first rival was Sociedade Esportiva Esperança, from the same city. At that time, Novo Hamburgo was named Floriano. The derby was known as Flor-Esp.

The second and current rival of Novo Hamburgo is Aimoré from São Leopoldo, as both cities are located in the Sinos River Valley, the derby is known as the Clássico do Vale (Derby of the Valley). This rivalry was stronger during the 1960s and the 1970s, but continues up until today.

== Current squad ==
Note: Flags indicate national team as defined under FIFA eligibility rules; some limited exceptions apply. Players may hold more than one non-FIFA nationality.

| No. | Pos. | Nation | Player |
|---|---|---|---|
| — | GK | BRA | Matheus Cavichioli |
| — | GK | BRA | Max |
| — | GK | BRA | Matheus Kerstner |
| — | DF | BRA | Júlio Santos |
| — | DF | BRA | Ricardo Schneider |
| — | DF | BRA | Marcão |
| — | DF | BRA | Léo |
| — | DF | BRA | Ângelo |
| — | DF | BRA | Brida |
| — | DF | BRA | Assis |

| No. | Pos. | Nation | Player |
|---|---|---|---|
| — | MF | BRA | Tiago Ott |
| — | MF | BRA | Jardel |
| — | MF | BRA | Danilo Goiano |
| — | MF | BRA | Júlio Abu |
| — | MF | BRA | Conrado |
| — | MF | BRA | Jeff Silva |
| — | FW | BRA | João Paulo |
| — | FW | BRA | Jefferson Assis |
| — | FW | BRA | Juninho Brandão |
| — | FW | BRA | Branquinho |

== Honours ==
=== Official tournaments ===
State
| Competitions | Titles | Seasons |
|---|---|---|
| Campeonato Gaúcho | 1 | 2017 |
| Copa FGF | 2^{s} | 2005, 2013 |
| Campeonato Gaúcho Série A2 | 3 | 1996, 2000, 2025 |

- record
- ^{s} shared record

=== Others tournaments ===
==== State ====
- Copa ACEG (2): 1982, 1984
- Copa Emídio Perondi (1): 2005
- Copa Metropolitana (2): 2013, 2014
- Campeonato do Interior Gaúcho (7): 1942, 1947, 1949, 1950, 1952, 1972, 1980

==== City ====
- Campeonato Citadino de Porto Alegre (1): 1937
- Campeonato Citadino de Novo Hamburgo (35): 1911, 1912, 1913, 1914, 1915, 1916, 1917, 1918, 1919, 1920, 1921, 1922, 1923, 1924, 1925, 1926, 1927, 1928, 1929, 1930, 1931, 1932, 1933, 1934, 1935, 1936, 1937, 1938, 1939, 1940, 1941, 1942, 1943, 1944, 1945

=== Runners-up ===
- Campeonato Gaúcho (5): 1942, 1947, 1949, 1950, 1952
- Copa FGF (1): 2021
- Recopa Gaúcha (1): 2018
- Copa Governador do Estado (2): 1970, 1987
- Super Copa Gaúcha (1): 2014
- Campeonato Gaúcho Série A2 (1): 2003

== Ultra groups ==
Two ultra groups supports the club: Fogo Anil and Torcida Independente Mancha Anil. Fogo Anil was founded in 1996, and Torcida Independente Mancha Anil was founded on 13 May 2005.

== Anthem ==
The club's anthem lyrics were composed by Juracy Araújo, the music by Pedro Araújo and the piano transcription by Rejane Frota Dillenburg.

== Mascot ==
The club's mascot is an anthropomorphic shoe, as Novo Hamburgo is known for its shoe industry.
