= Três Passos =

Municipality in Rio Grande do Sul, Brazil

Coordinates: 27°27′21″S 53°55′55″W

- Municipality
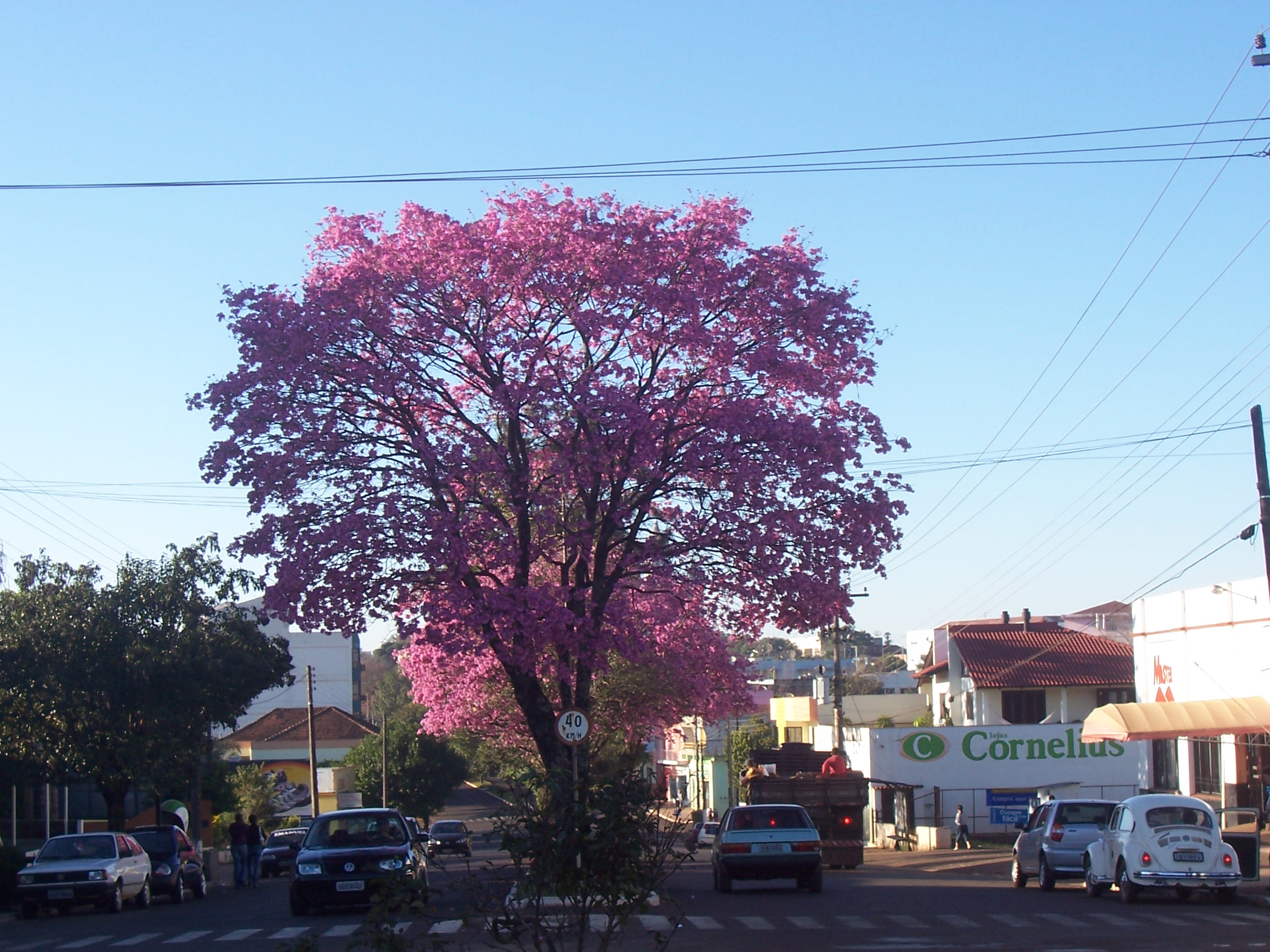

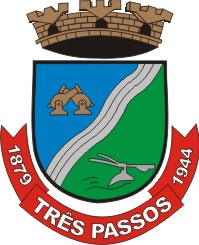
- Flag Coat of arms

- Location of Três Passos in Rio Grande do Sul
- Country: Brazil
- Region: South
- State: Rio Grande do Sul
- Mesoregion: Noroeste Rio-Grandense
- Microregion: Três Passos
- Founded: 28 December 1944

Government
  - Mayor: Arlei Luis Tomazoni (PSDB, 2021 - 2024)

Area
  - Total: 268.902 km^{2} (103.824 sq mi)

Population (2021)
  - Total: 23,799
  - Density: 88.504/km^{2} (229.23/sq mi)
- Demonym: Trespassense
- Time zone: UTC−3 (BRT)
- Website: Official website

Três Passos is a municipality in the state of Rio Grande do Sul, Brazil. As of 2020, the estimated population was 23,852.

== See also ==
- List of municipalities in Rio Grande do Sul
