= Tupi Futebol Clube =

Tupi
- Full name: Tupi Futebol Clube
- Nickname(s): Tupi; Rubro-Negro; Índio Guerreiro
- Founded: May 1, 1949 (75 years ago)
- Ground: Estádio Rubro-Negro
- Capacity: 3,000
Home colors	Away colors

Tupi Futebol Clube, commonly referred to as Tupi, is a Brazilian football club based in Estádio Municipal Rubro-Negro Hinterholz em Crissiumal, Rio Grande do Sul. It currently plays in Campeonato Gaúcho Série A2, the second level of the Rio Grande do Sul state football league.

== History ==
The club was founded on May 1, 1949. They finished in the second place in the Campeonato Gaúcho Third Level in 1969, losing the competition to Três Passos. Tupy won the Campeonato Gaúcho Third Level in 2013.

== Honours ==
- Campeonato Gaúcho Série B
  - Winners (1): 2013

== Stadium ==
Tupy Futebol Clube play their home games at Estádio Elias Ozias Zoltan, nicknamed Estádio Municipal Rubro-Negro. The stadium has a maximum capacity of 3,000 people.
