= Americo Makk =

Hungarian painter (1927 – 2015)

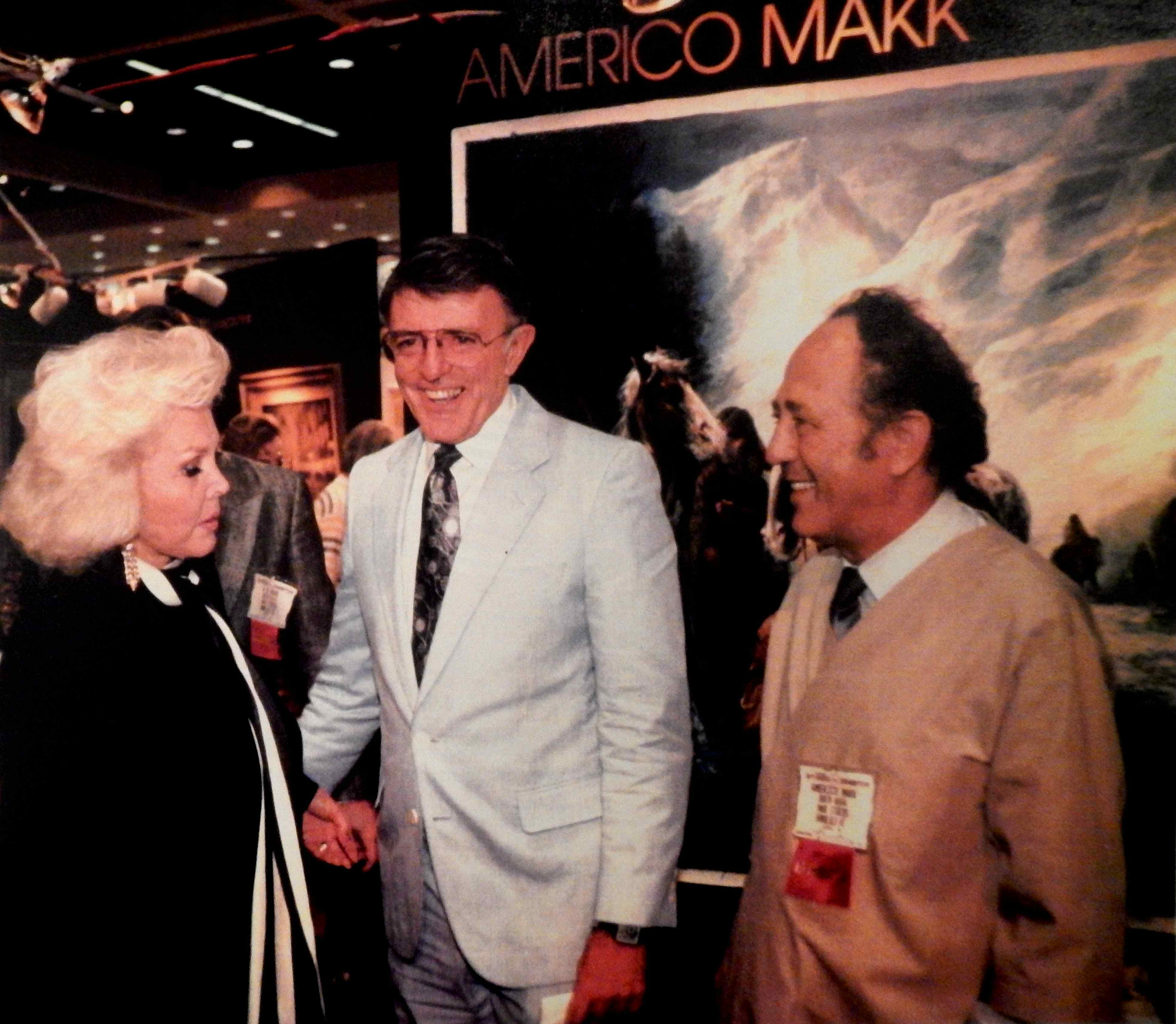
- Americo Makk (right) with Eva Gabor and John Astin at Art Expo, CA, 1988
- Born: Imre Makk; August 25, 1927; Győrszentmárton, Győr-Moson-Sopron County, Hungary
- Died: May 5, 2015 (aged 87)
- Citizenship: Hungarian
- Education: Hungarian University of Fine Arts, Accademia di Belle Arti di Roma
- Occupation: Painter
- Notable work: "Coronation of Our Lady", "Amazonas", "The Ascension of Christ", portraits of Presidents Jimmy Carter and Ronald Reagan, portrait of Ray Price, "Trilogy"
- Spouse: Eva Holusa (m. 1950)
- Children: Americo Bartholomew "A.B." (Died July 2, 2026)
- Parent(s): Pál Makk, Katalin Samoday
- Awards: Hungarian Golden Cross of Merit (2013)
- Website: makkart.com

Americo Makk (born Imre Makk; August 24, 1927 – May 5, 2015) was a Hungarian-born painter known for his work in portraiture and ecclesiastical art. After early artistic training in Hungary and Italy, he lived and worked in Brazil. In 1962, Makk emigrated to the United States. His subjects included political figures such as U.S. presidents Jimmy Carter and Ronald Reagan, as well as religious murals and paintings commissioned by churches and government institutions.

Early life and education Imre Makk was born in 1927 in Győrszentmárton, Hungary (now known as Pannonhalma), to Katalin (née Samoday) and Pál Makk, who worked as a financial supervisor for the Benedictine monks at Pannonhalma Archabbey. Makk developed an early interest in art, beginning to sketch at the age of six, and was encouraged by the Benedictine brothers to nurture his artistic talent.

Although his parents advised him to pursue a more stable career in architectural engineering, he chose instead to study painting at the Hungarian National Academy of Fine Arts in Budapest from 1945 to 1948. At the age of 21, he was awarded a scholarship to study at the Academy of Fine Art in Rome, where he specialized in ecclesiastical art and studied the works of Renaissance masters, including Raphael, Michelangelo, and Leonardo da Vinci.

Makk eventually taught at the Rome Academy of Fine Art and received the Vatican Portrait Award for his painting of Cardinal József Mindszenty, a leading opponent of communism in Hungary. The portrait was permanently installed in the Vatican.

== Career ==
=== Brazil and life as the Makks (1949–1962) ===
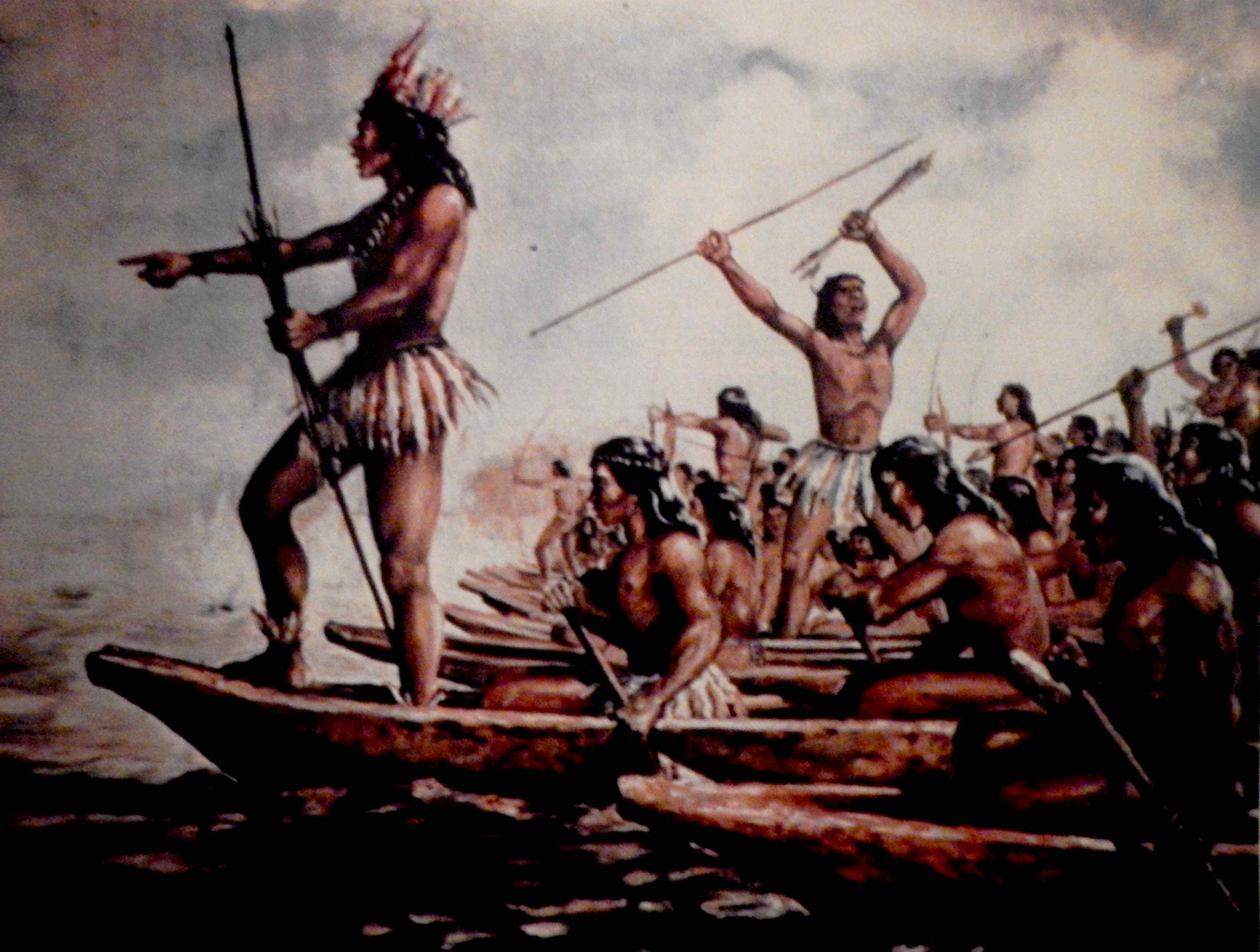
One of Four in a Series, Mural of Brazilian Chief Ajuricaba, by Americo Makk

In 1949, Americo Makk moved to São Paulo, Brazil. His wife's father, Dr. Bertalan Holusa, a former economic and agricultural adviser to Ethiopia's Haile Selassie, had fled from Africa with his family to France in 1937 as a result of the Second Italo-Ethiopian War and then to São Paulo with its rapid industrialization. "Imre" in Portuguese is "Americo", and it was here that Americo adopted the Portuguese translation for his name. Americo and Eva married in São Paulo on October 18, 1950. In 1951, they were appointed professors of Fine Arts at the Academia de Belas Artes. That same year, their son, Americo Bartholomew, A.B. Makk, was born. While in Brazil, Americo and Eva Makk jointly painted fourteen Catholic cathedrals, churches, and basilicas. Their most famous cathedral painting, "Coronation of Our Lady", was a 2,349 square foot (218 square meters) al-secco ceiling in the Cathedral of Manaus. This painting, which depicts the coronation of the Virgin Mary in her crowning as the Queen of Heaven, is the largest single motif painting in the world. The mural reportedly took two years to complete, and involved working 60 to 100 feet in the air on wood scaffolding in "stifling heat and little light." Americo Makk reported rats getting into the paints and he suffered a fall from the scaffolding while painting. From 1958 to 1962, the Makks served as Official Artists of the Brazilian government. During this period, they painted portraits of government and church officials, including Sobral Bishop Dom José Tupinambá da Frota, and collaborated on cathedral murals. Their work combined Americo and Eva’s individual styles, producing murals that appeared to be created by a single artist. From then on, Americo and Eva became synonymous with each other's work, and the Makk family brand, "Casal Makk" (Portuguese for "Makk couple"), was created. The remaining cathedral wall and ceiling paintings by the Makks, which are signed Casal Makk, are tourist attractions in Brazil to this day. Notable among these are those found in the Parish of Our Lady of Patronage (Nossa Senhora do Patrocinio) in Jau, State of São Paulo, Brazil.

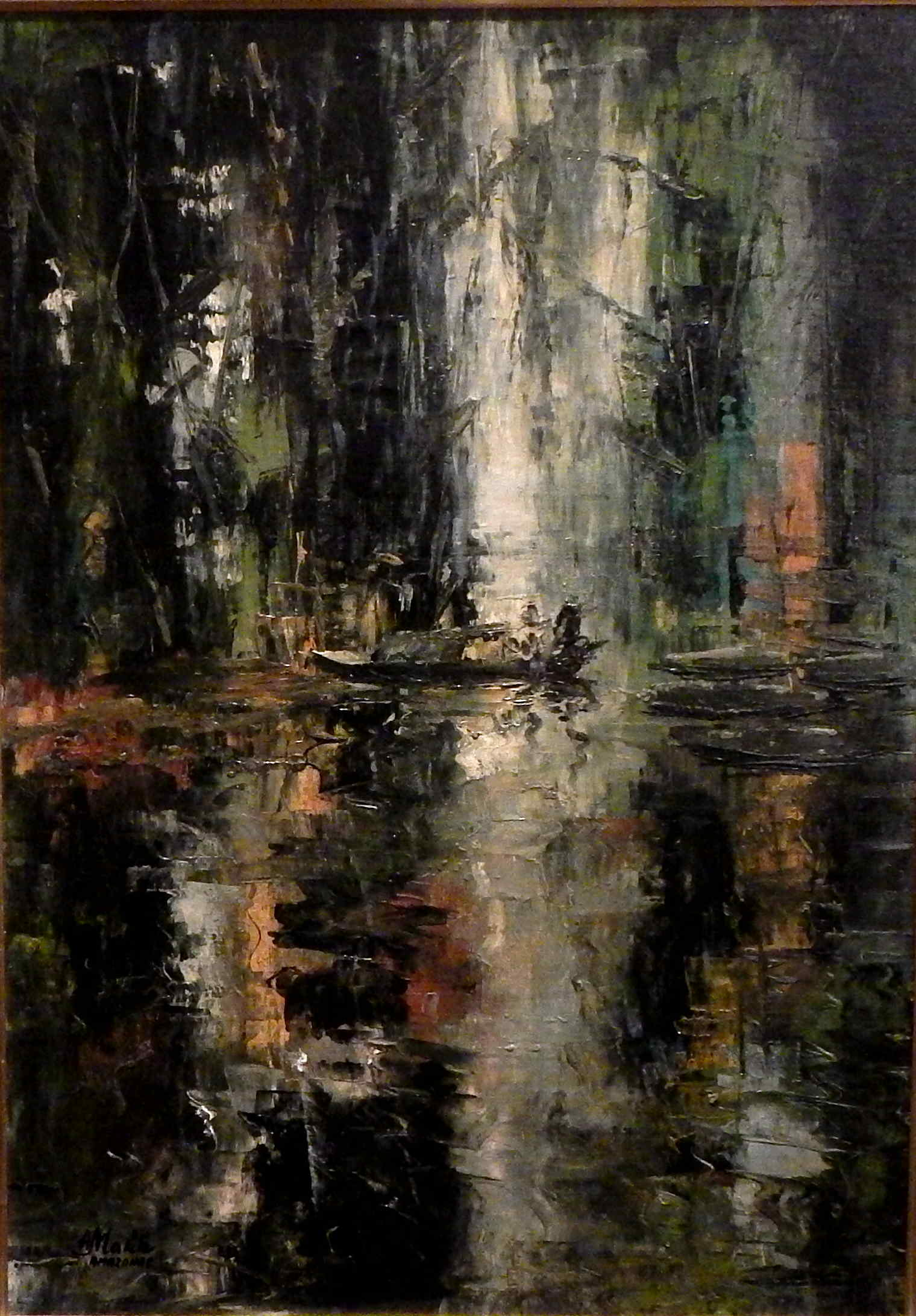
Americo Makk, Amazonas, 1959

=== Amazon expedition (1957–1959) ===
In 1957, their cathedral work culminated with a request via telegram from the Governor of Amazonas, Plínio Ramos Coelho, for an assignment to travel the Amazon jungle. The jungle is also known as the Amazon rainforest or Amazonia. There, they were to study the remaining Indigenous Indian tribes which were thinning by a boom of industrial growth and deforestation. Both Governor Coehlo and the Mayor of Manaus, Gilberto Mestrinho (later to succeed Coelho as Governor), co-sponsored the expedition, which was planned to last approximately one to two years. Paintings were the medium of choice for the project, as it was known that some tribes hidden in the darkness of the jungle became anxious or reacted violently to camera flashes or flashbulbs. For the year preceding the trip, Americo and Eva Makk explored areas of the rainforest to get acquainted with the subject matter.

In 1958, the Makks, including 8-year-old A.B. with pet ocelot "Cica" (Hungarian for "cat"), accompanied by guides and a Catholic missionary priest, embarked on their expedition to study the flora, fauna, and inhabitants of the Amazon rainforest. They planned to meet guides at designated checkpoints, who were considered friendly Indians of various tribes. The expedition began in Manaus, the capital of Amazonas, and the heart of the Amazon jungle. The trip spanned over 1,000 miles of travel by foot, riverboat, canoe, small plane, and helicopter. Travel was difficult as there were no roads, and frequent rains led to floods that washed away landmarks. With high humidity and rain, the Makks described suffering frequent bites from small black insects called "piums".

Through the expedition, the Makks gathered and recorded images of varying indigenous people of Brazil, which included the Macus, Bare, Tucano, and Boca Negra (Tenharim). Some tribes they met along the way believed that to have their image painted would result in their souls being stolen. Thus, simple sketches were made in those regions. The Makks' memories of the trip were recorded in an estimated 70 paintings. In a 1982 interview for Aloha Magazine, Eva Makk said of her experience in the Amazon jungle, "Sometimes it was so dark and dense that we had to use flashlights at high noon in order to see... I think of it as a forbidden cathedral of God."

Upon their return, the Makks painted four large murals in the Palace of the Governor in Manaus, Palacio Rio Negro. One of the four paintings was of Brazilian Chief Ajuricaba leading his warriors during the expansion of Portuguese colonization of the Americas. This painting shows them with bow and arrow, going into battle against invading Portuguese forces that were armed with forged weaponry and armor. Paintings marked "Amazonas" denoted the origin and time frame of the painting, in lieu of a title. A small portion of their Amazon paintings was exhibited at the Brazilian consulate in Miami, Florida, in May 1969.

In an interview from 1981, when asked whether he would have attempted the trip a second time, Americo responded, "It would be too dangerous to try now. It was too dangerous then. But we [he and Eva] had an artistic feeling and desire to meet challenges, to know and to paint what no one had ever painted before. So, we accepted the invitation of the government. We were both ‘official artists of Brazil.’ But when it was over, we decided we would never do anything like that again. Because you only have one life."

=== Move to New York City (1962–1967) ===
By 1960, the communist movement controlled television, radio, and the press in São Paulo. Foodstuffs and gasoline were luxuries. As a result of the increasing political unrest in Brazil, the Makks worked on immigrating to the United States, to once again escape communism, which took two years to accomplish. As they continued work on church paintings, the Makks often wondered whether the communists would soon destroy them. In 1962, the Makks secured a sponsorship from the Ecclesiastical Art Studio of New York in New York City and moved to Long Island, New York. They left behind most of their belongings in Brazil to allow room for the Amazon paintings and sketches, taking with them four suitcases and a small amount of cash. On May 10, 1962, knowing very little English, the Makks arrived at Idlewild Airport, in Queens, NY.

Both Americo and Eva began exhibiting their work in New York in 1963. Returning to their ancestral roots with a Hungarian colony in New York, they began preserving Hungarian history and culture in their work. They also continued painting under contract for the Ecclesiastical Art Studio of New York to restore and decorate church ceilings and mural paintings. In 1963, the Makks painted the Immaculate Conception Church located near West Point, The United States Military Academy. In 1964, they were commissioned to paint a 26-foot by 12-foot canvas mural called "The Ascension of Christ" for the Memorial United Church of Christ in Dayton, Ohio. In 1964 and 1965, Americo and Eva Makk exhibited their work at the World's Fair at the Paris Pavilion in New York. A major portion of their collection at the 1964 World's Fair consisted of the Makks' Amazonas paintings. In 1966, The Makks filmed a television show on NBC-TV featuring their paintings at the Smithsonian Institution in Washington, D.C., which aired on December 4, 1966. In 1966 and 1967, the Makks' paintings were exhibited at the International Art Show at the Carnegie Endowment International Center in New York City. In 1967, the Makks made an appearance on the Johnny Gilbert Show in Dayton, Ohio, executing a painting on camera. On April 17, 1967, Americo Makk, sponsored by Prince Rainier III, was awarded the top "Director's Prize" by the International Art Exchange, New York-Paris-Monaco Exhibition, for his oil painting titled "Blue Morning." The painting was subsequently shown at Salle d'Exposition Wilson in Paris. The Makks were elected in 1969 to the "Fifty American Artists Association" of representational artists.

=== Relocation to Hawaii (1967–2015) ===
In 1967, before going to Paris for the Salle d' Exposition in Paris, the Makks visited Hawaii and made the decision to relocate to the island of Oahu that same year. The reason for the change was in part due to Americo's health concerns such as arthritis affecting his hands.

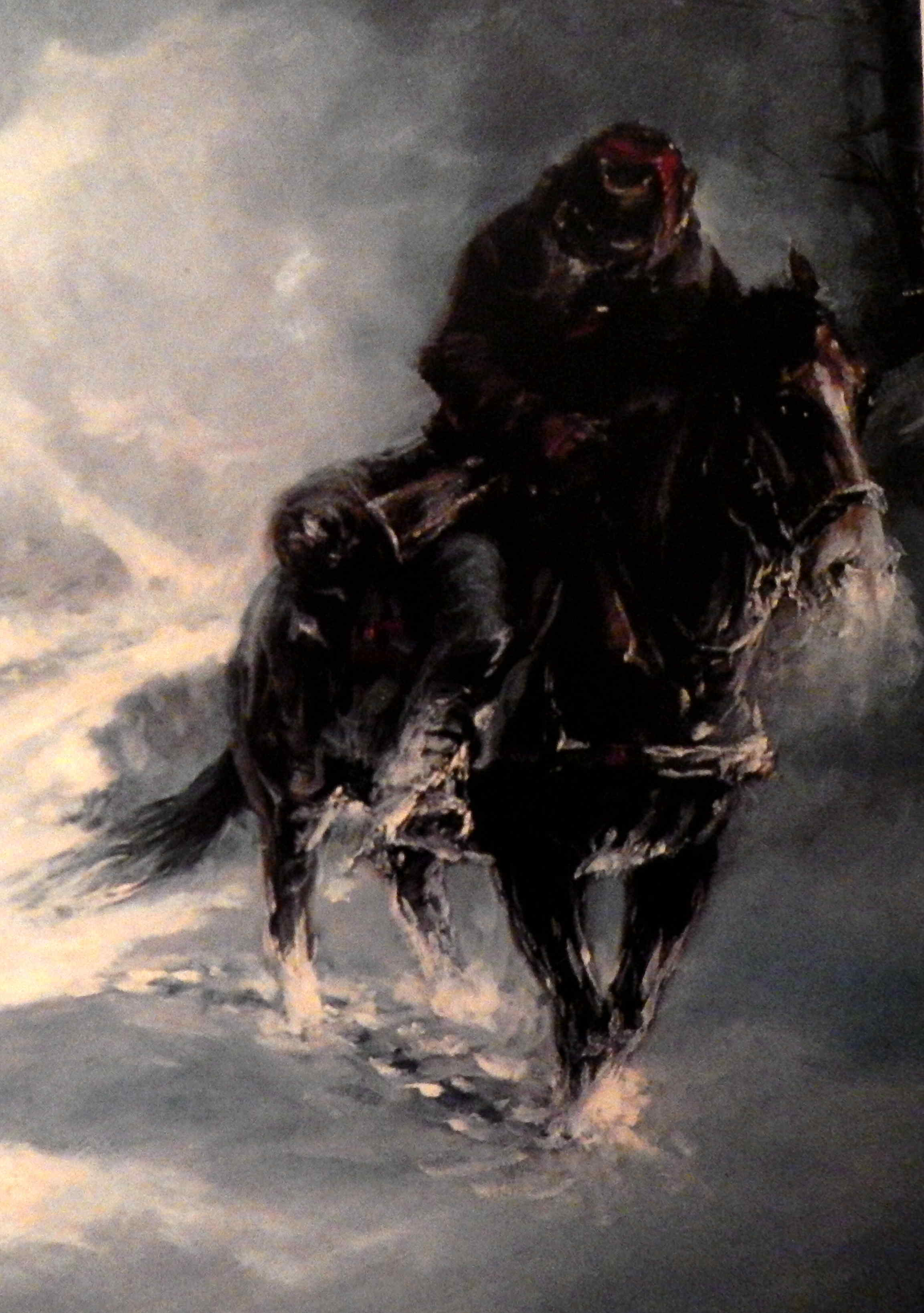
Detail of horse's breath from "Windy Crossing"

=== The Presidents and beyond ===
In 1967 the Los Angeles Museum sent Americo to sketch ranches in California, a subject also pursued in Texas.

In 1978, Americo Makk was commissioned to paint a portrait of Jimmy Carter to be presented by Governor George Ariyoshi to the president as a “gift of state” from the people of Hawaii. The portrait hung in Senator Daniel Inouye's office for several months before the presentation to the President. In 1979, Ariyoshi presented the painting to President Carter at the Governor's Conference in Washington, D.C. In 1984 the painting was described by an anonymous writer in the Hawaiian periodical Artists in Paradise: "Light comes from the flag, draped above and behind Carter, the source of his power and inspiration. The focus of this light is the right side of Carter's face, drawing attention to his scholar's brow and the clear directness of his eyes. However, the left side of Carter's face is in relative darkness, reminding us that the President is but a man, and foretelling the judgment of historians that the issues which faced Carter's administration were not resolved."

In 1982, the hardbound book Makk, edited with commentary by Larry LeDoux, was published by Herff Jones Publishers in Logan, Utah documenting the art and history of the Makk family in 96 pages.

In 1982, Americo Makk was commissioned to paint a portrait of President Ronald Reagan, while Eva Makk was commissioned to paint Nancy Reagan. Americo created two original portrait studies of the President that were previewed at the Nelson Rockefeller Collection in Palm Springs and were the forerunners to the final painting. On March 5, 1983, the Rockefeller Gallery held a reception presenting the early paintings of the President by Americo Makk as part of its West Coast premiere in Palm Springs. Americo Makk expressed his concerns with painting the portrait in an interview for The Desert Sun, that if a president did not appreciate his portrait then the artist faced public scrutiny, referencing President Lyndon B. Johnson's portrait painted by respected landscape artist Peter Hurd. Americo, with Eva and A.B., personally presented the 60-inch by 40-inch painting to President Reagan in the oval office of the White House on March 29, 1984, with the American Hungarian Federation. Two additional portraits were also presented to the first family. Americo painted President Reagan with the Space Shuttle in the background. Eva Makk painted a portrait of the President and Nancy Reagan together, which was 60 inches by 40 inches. An article in the Hawaiian periodical Artists in Paradise said of President Reagan's portrait that its "imagery, execution and technique reflect the spirit of our modern times with their sudden changes in political alignments, their looming national conflicts, their rapid advances in technology, and the need for decisive leadership and prompt action if we are to survive as a nation ... Makk's portrait dramatizes the soul and significance of a strong American President."

In 1984, Americo was commissioned to paint Dr. Edward Teller. The painting was presented to Dr. Teller and displayed in the United States Senate Rotunda in May 1984 along with other retrospective works by the Makks. Paintings displayed in the Rotunda were stamped on the reverse "Washington, D.C., United States Capitol, United States Senate" commemorating the exhibit.

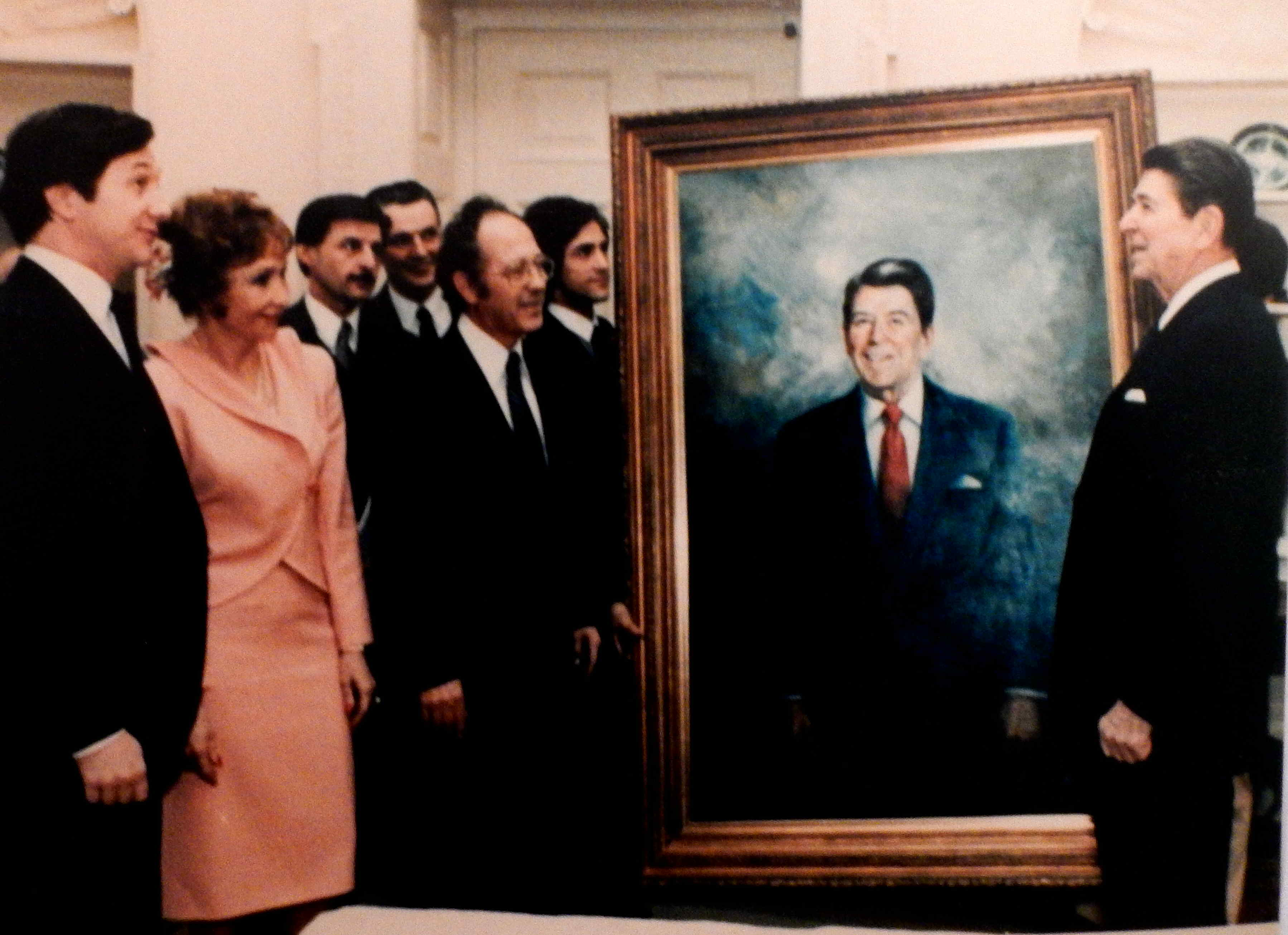
Presentation of Portrait to President Reagan, 1984

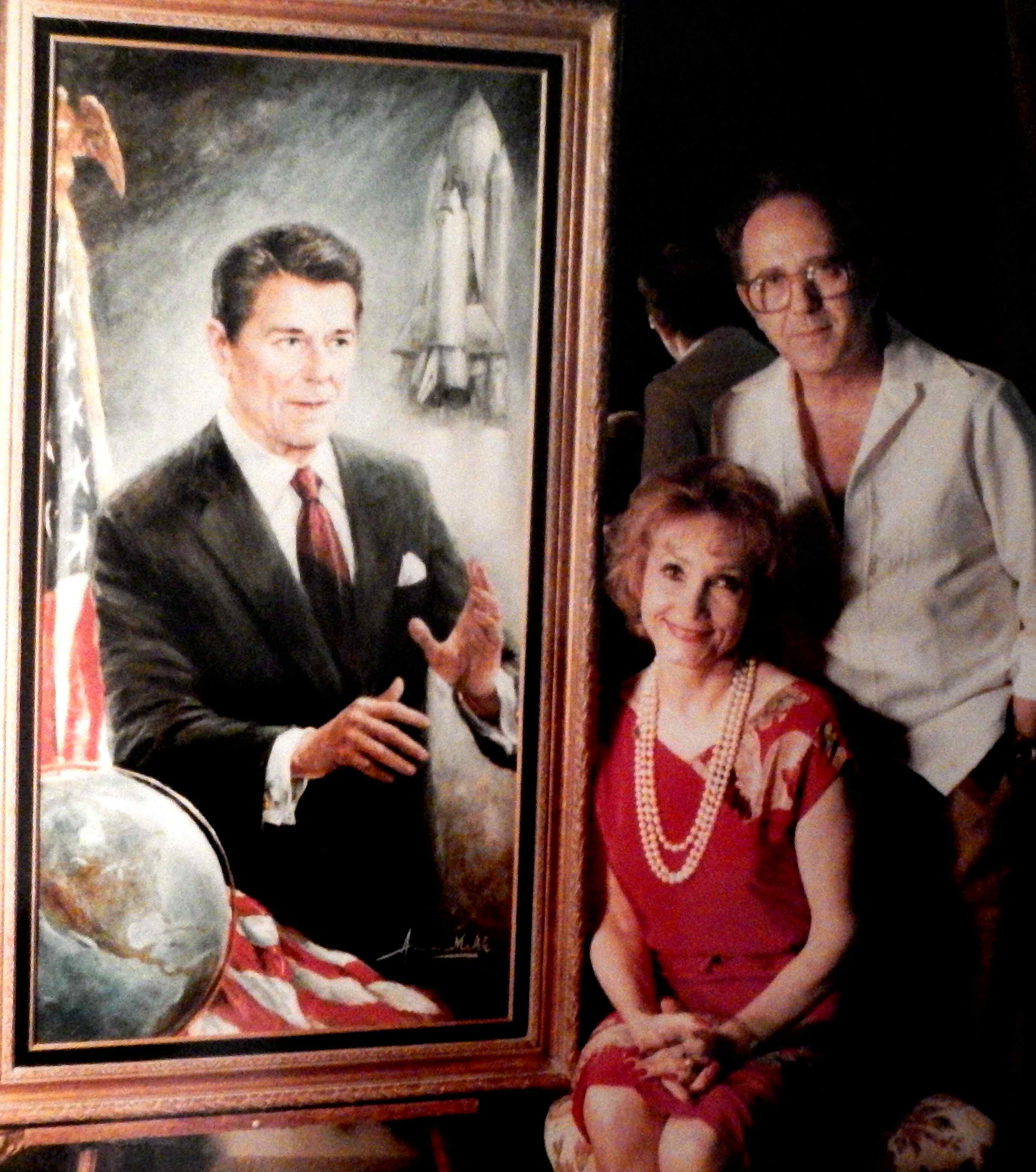
Americo and Eva Makk with Portrait of President Reagan with Shuttle, 1984

In 1985, Americo painted a portrait of country singer Ray Price, who used the portrait as his album cover for “Portrait of a Singer” in 1985. The painting was featured again in a later album of Price in 1991.

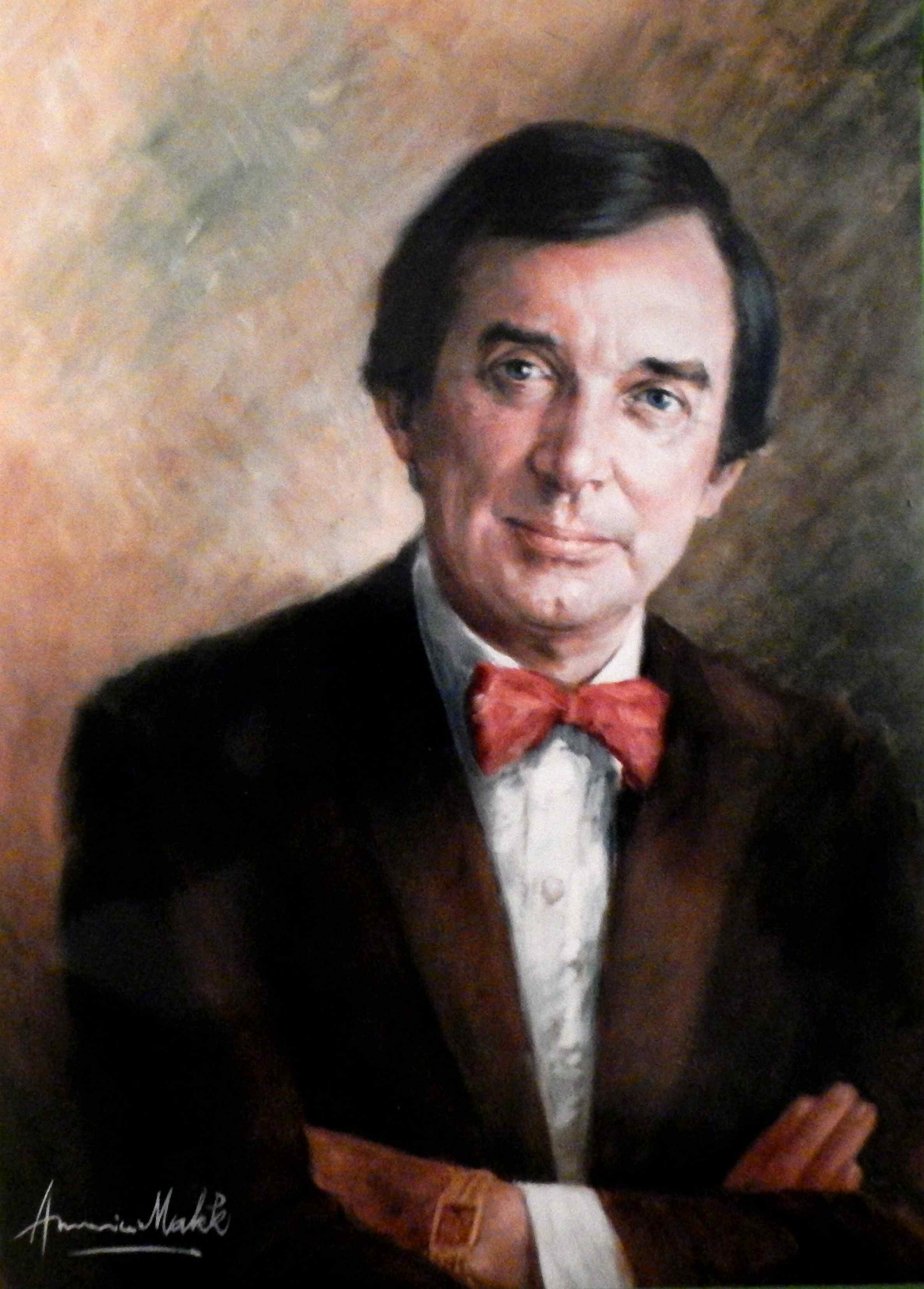
"Ray Price" portrait by Americo Makk, 1985

In 1985, Americo, Eva, and A.B. painted the first in a series of large collaborative paintings, at 5 feet by 8 feet, combining the styles of all three painters, called "Trilogy", a view of Central Park. The next collaborative work "Spirit of Paris" was unveiled at a private reception at Lawrence Ross Galleries in Beverly Hills in January 1986. Americo painted the rightmost one-third of the painting, while Eva painted the center third and A.B. painted the leftmost one-third of the painting. Each artist signed below the area of their work.

In 1986, the book Makk Family, A Vision of Life, was published by Makk Studios in Honolulu, Hawaii. It was also produced in a limited edition with a wood box set and special prints of the family's paintings.

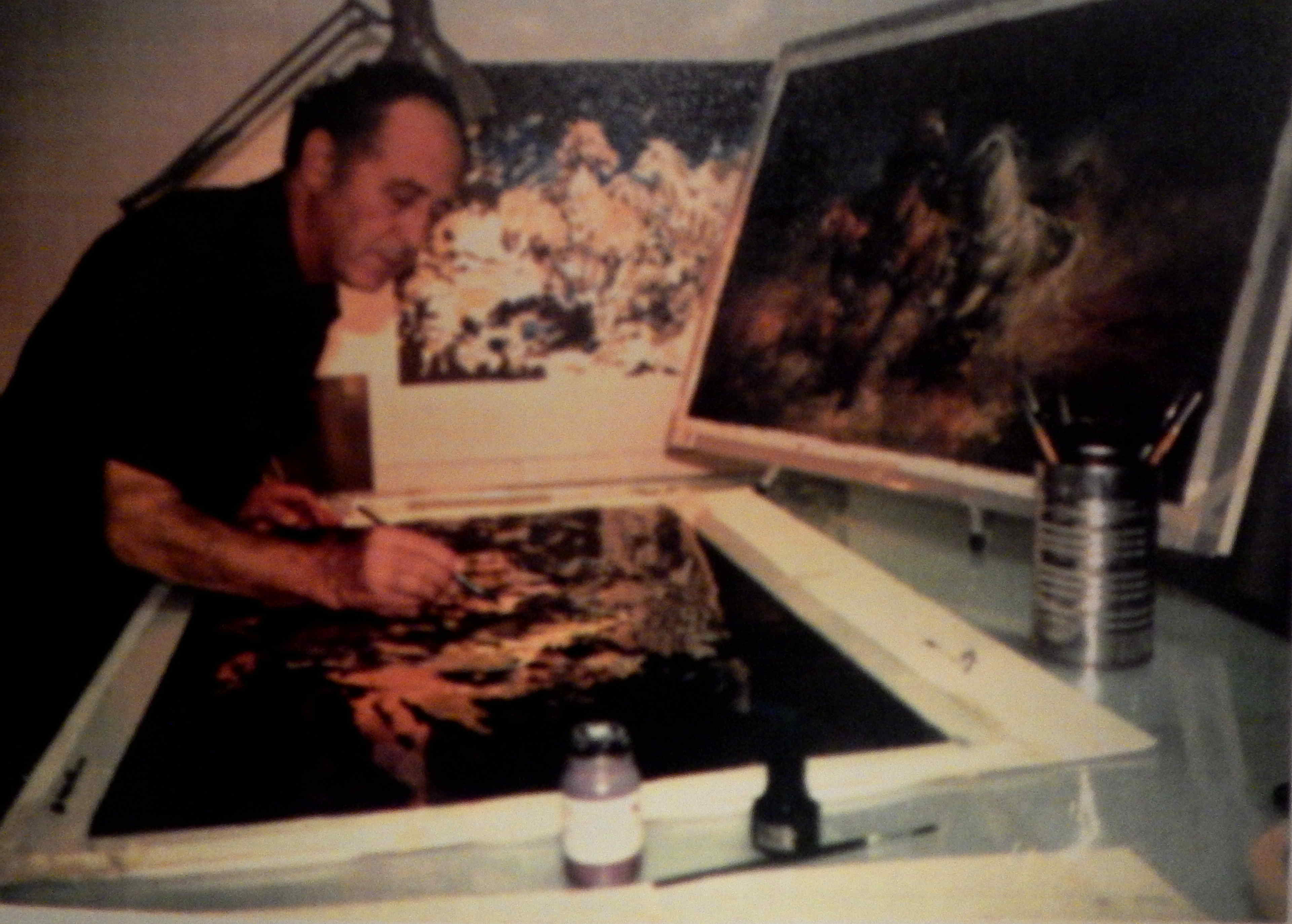
Americo Makk creating serigraph of "Matching Strength"

In 1987, the Makks entered into an agreement with Artcorp., a wholly owned subsidiary of Panz Corporation Ltd., a New Zealand conglomerate, for the publication and distribution of the family's serigraphs. In the Summer of 1988, the Makks opened their serigraphy studio Vision Fine Art Press where they produced the limited edition artwork. The first serigraphs produced by the studio were Eva Makk's "Snowflakes" and Americo Makk's "Matching Strength." The serigraphs of selected paintings were numbered and signed and were typically given runs of 100 to 275 editions. The Makks were presented with awards from Screen Printing Association International (SPAI) in 1991 for "On Wings" by Eva Makk, in 1992 for "High Camp" by Americo Makk, 1993 "Quartet" by Eva Makk, and 1994 "Rolling Clouds" and ""Silver with Gold" both by Americo Makk. Vision Fine Art Press also represented notable artist Cliff Tanaka, winning an award for his serigraphy as well. Due to the high costs of production, serigraphy ended at the studio and reproductions went to giclee format.

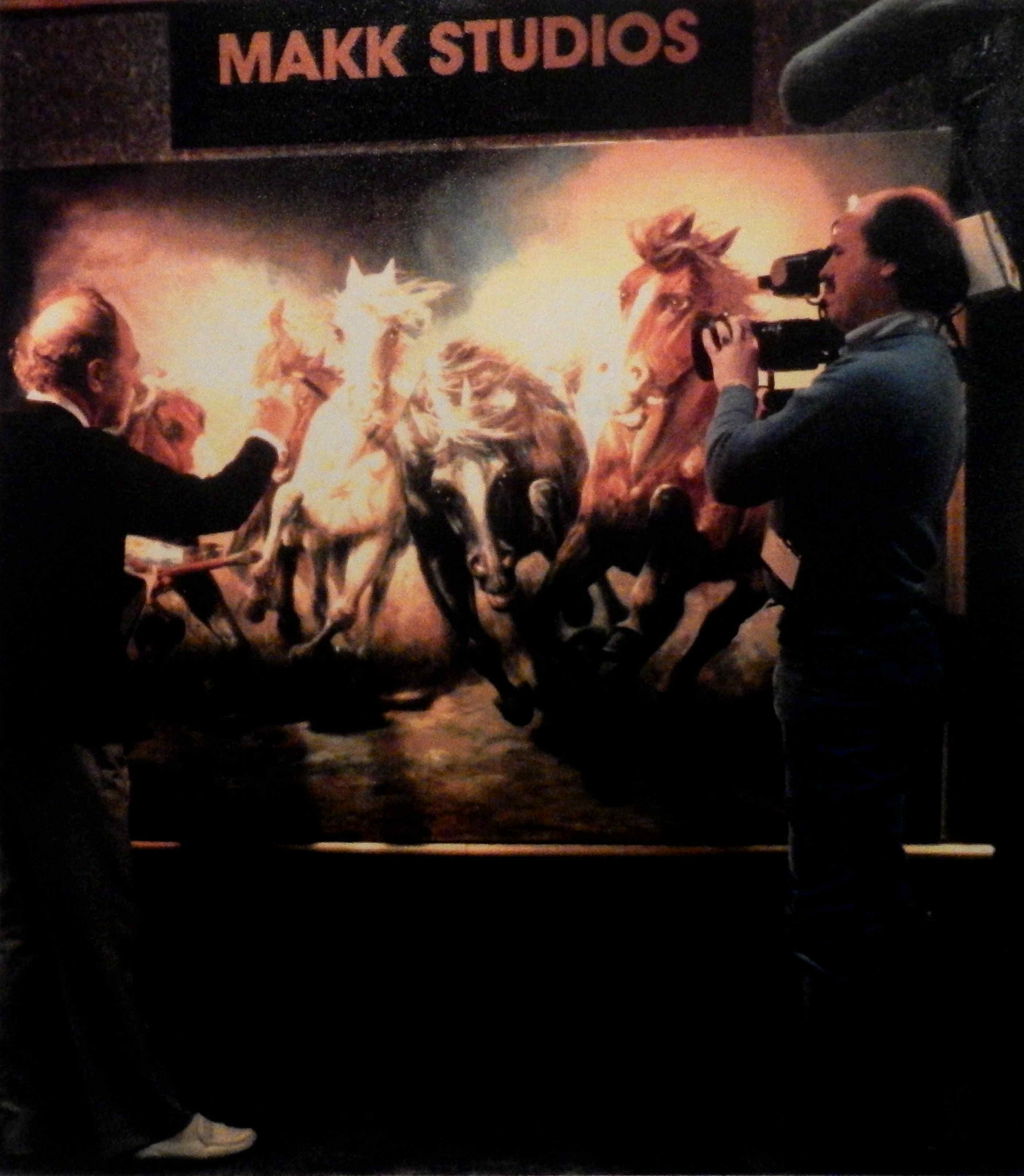
Americo Makk demonstrates a technique for CBS at ArtExpo, 1989

Throughout the 1980s and into the 1990s, the Makks displayed exhibits of their work at the ArtExpos in New York City and Los Angeles. The Makks' paintings, which included the collaborative painting Fisherman's Wharf as the backdrop, were featured at the ArtExpo-New York.

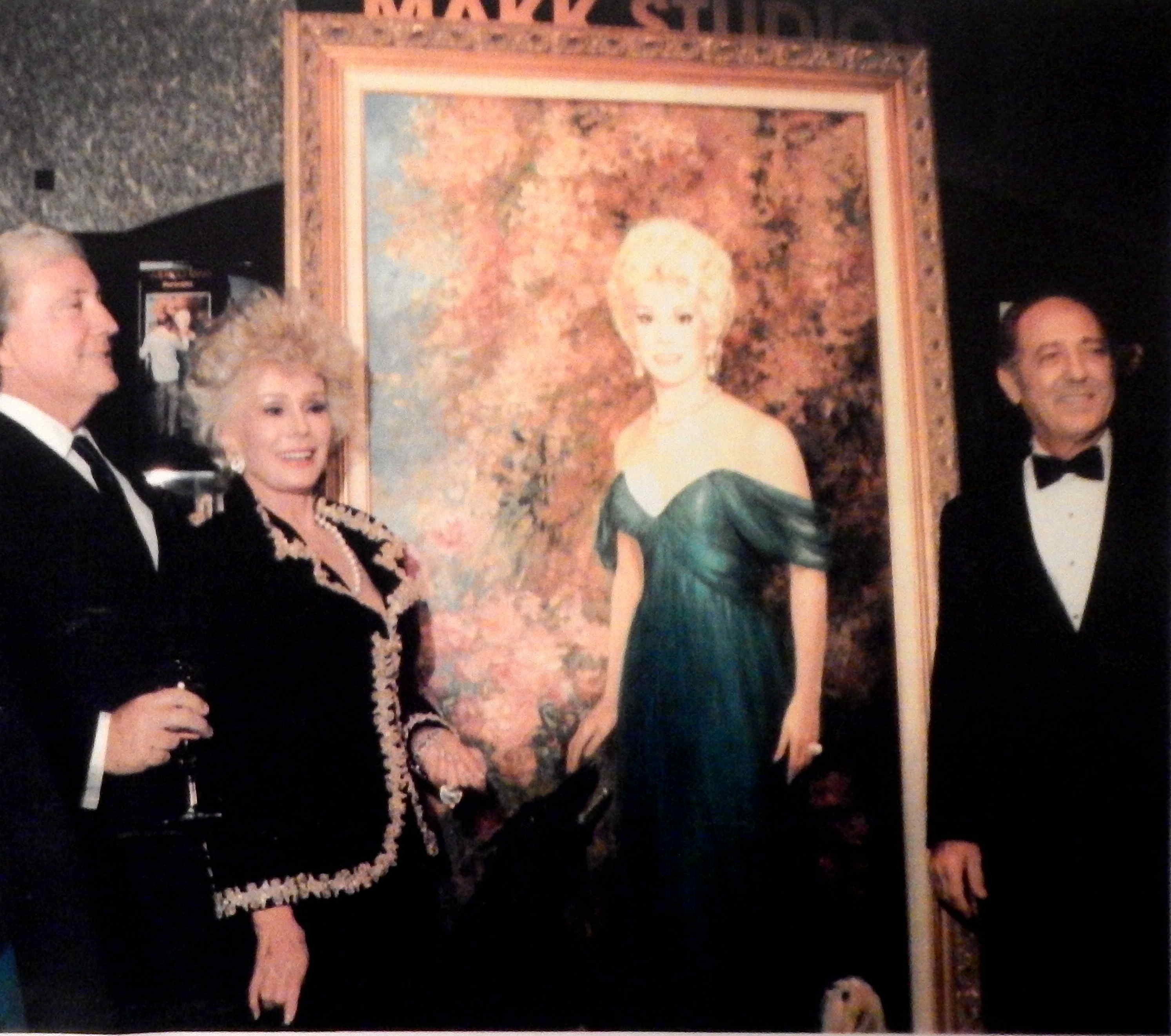
Presentation of Portrait to Eva Gabor with Merv Griffin left and Americo Makk right

On October 19, 1989, Makk Studios opened its Beverly Hills, CA gallery with Casey Kasem hosting the gala. On October 26, 1989, the gallery held a reception and unveiled a portrait of Eva Gabor commissioned with Americo. Public relations and marketing for the Beverly Hills Gallery were handled through Kukirin Company, which focused on the timeliness of Americo Makk's history in escaping communist oppression in its marketing campaign in the 1980s.

Among the artists exhibited at Makk Galleries were actress Barbara Carrera and actor Buddy Ebsen. Interviewed in 1989, Ebsen stated, "My introduction to the Makk Family is one of the most important events of my life. The fact that these superbly talented artists- Americo, Eva, and A.B.- so long and firmly established at the highest levels in the world of art, have found merit in my paintings, is my proudest creative achievement. I hope to justify their faith in my work."

From 1967 through the present, the Makks have shown their work across the United States at galleries and museums, and internationally in São Paulo, Rio de Janeiro, Brazilia, Caracas, Madrid, Munich, Monte Carlo, Paris, Lisbon, Vancouver, Vienna, Geneva, Sidney and Montreal. Paintings by Americo Makk have been exhibited at Carnegie International Center (NY), U.S. Senate Rotunda (Washington, D.C.), Monaco Intercontinental Exhibition (Paris), and St. Stephen Museum (Hungary). Over six decades, Americo Makk's work, as well as that of Eva and A.B., has been recognized with awards and honors including the American Ecclesiastic Award, European Banner of the Arts, Oscar d’Italia, Einstein International Academy Foundation Medal for Peace and Outstanding Achievement Award for Western Paintings (American Biographical Institute). There is a permanent exhibition of Americo Makk's paintings at the Museum of Hungarian Military History in Budapest.

== Preservation of Hungarian history ==
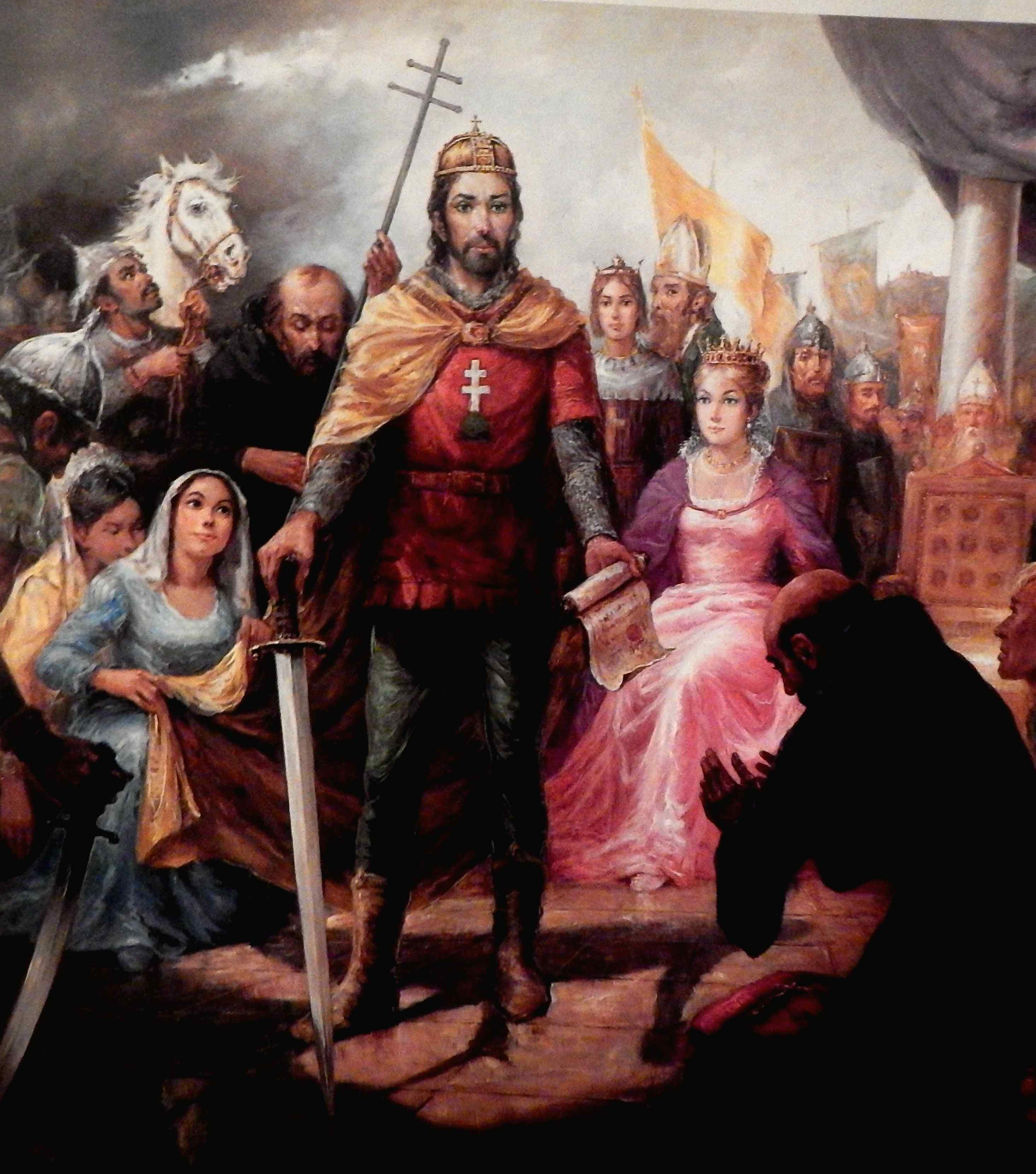
"St. Stephen:The King of Christian Hungary" by Americo Makk

Over the course of their careers, Americo and Eva Makk donated their talent to preserving and promoting the cultural heritage and history of Hungary. In 1966, Americo Makk, then vice president of the American Hungarian Art Association and World Federation of Hungarian Artists, created the painting "For Self-Determination" commemorating the 10th anniversary of the 1956 Hungarian Revolution exhibited at the Carnegie International Center, United Nations Plaza and Smithsonian. The Makks later embarked on a larger long-term project producing two large paintings (72 inches X 96 inches) for each century of Hungary's nationhood, which began in the year 895 A.D. The first four in the series painted are "Arpad: The Birth of Hungary", "St. Stephen: The King of Christian Hungary", "King Matthias: The Splendor of Hungarian Renaissance, 1458-1490" and "The Liberation of Buda: Fall of the Ottoman Empire in Europe". The paintings were exhibited as a focal point of a presentation by the National Press Club commemorating the anniversary of the Hungarian Revolution against communism in 1956 as well as exhibited in the Senate Rotunda in 1986. At the request of Mississippi Senator John Stennis, the Makks were presented with the United States flag from the Capitol in recognition of the 30th anniversary of "the 1956 Freedom Flight" and for their Hungarian Exhibition displayed in the Rotunda in 1986. In May 2010, the Makks presented their thirteenth historical mural to the Museum of Hungarian Military History in Budapest, Hungary where their murals are on permanent display.

== Philanthropy ==
Americo Makk, with Eva and A.B., engaged in a variety of philanthropic efforts benefiting many charities and cultural endeavors throughout their careers. In New York, the Makks supported the Cerebral Palsy Association through a show at the Carnegie Endowment's International Center Building in Manhattan in 1966 and 1967. The Makks helped support the American Heart Association coordinating "Art for Art's Sake" auction at the Royal Hawaiian Hotel beginning in 1971 onward. They helped support "Housing Now" for the homeless, teaming up with Beverly Hills Businesses. Portions of proceeds to shows have been donated to local hospitals, such as the Pediatric Department of Charleston Memorial Hospital. In 1984, the painting "Carefree" along with a portrait of Barbara Sinatra was auctioned at Barbara Sinatra's art auction to benefit sexually abused children in Palms Springs, CA. Additional major charities the Makks contribute to include the American Cancer Society, UNICEF, Hope Ball for the Cancer League in Denver, and Heart Ball in Hawaii.

== Personal life ==
Americo Makk maintained his fellowship with the Catholic Church throughout his life. In the 1970s, Makk changed his signature style from the printed "A. Makk" to the script version of his full name "Americo Makk". From the '70s onward, paintings were also regularly signed on the reverse side with the painting title, if titled, and ink stamped with the Makk Family crest and rights reserved. Notably, in older news articles Americo's name may be erroneously printed "Amerigo", which, although erroneous, is still Italian for "Imre". While the bulk of his work was in oil, Makk also worked in other media, such as watercolor. Cicely Barth Firestein characterized Makk's work as idealized portraiture in a "Rembrandt style." His work was described by the Valley Morning Star as a "renaissance style" utilizing "Dark colors and dramatic lighting combined to heighten the power and motion of his stampeding horses." Collectively, the family's approach - coined "The Makk style" - is recognized and taught in art schools as a unique and ennobling technique characterizing the painting from that era. Their painting style has also been described as "modern impressionist, romantic in mood, often nostalgic in sentiment".

While in Rome, Makk met Eva Holusa, a fellow student of Hungarian descent. The two later married and collaborated professionally throughout their artistic careers. Americo and Eva Makk had one child, Americo Bartholomew "A.B." Makk, born in 1951 (Died 2026). In 1988, A.B. Makk married Sylvia Magyarody, an abstract artist also of Hungarian descent, and she became a manager of Makk Studios. A.B. and Sylvia have one child, Alexandra Makk.

On May 5, 2015, at the age of 87, Americo Makk died from heart failure. His ashes were ceremonially scattered in the Pacific Ocean off the island of Oahu. Americo painted up to the days before his death. His final painting was a collaborative painting with Eva, A.B., and Sylvia Makk.

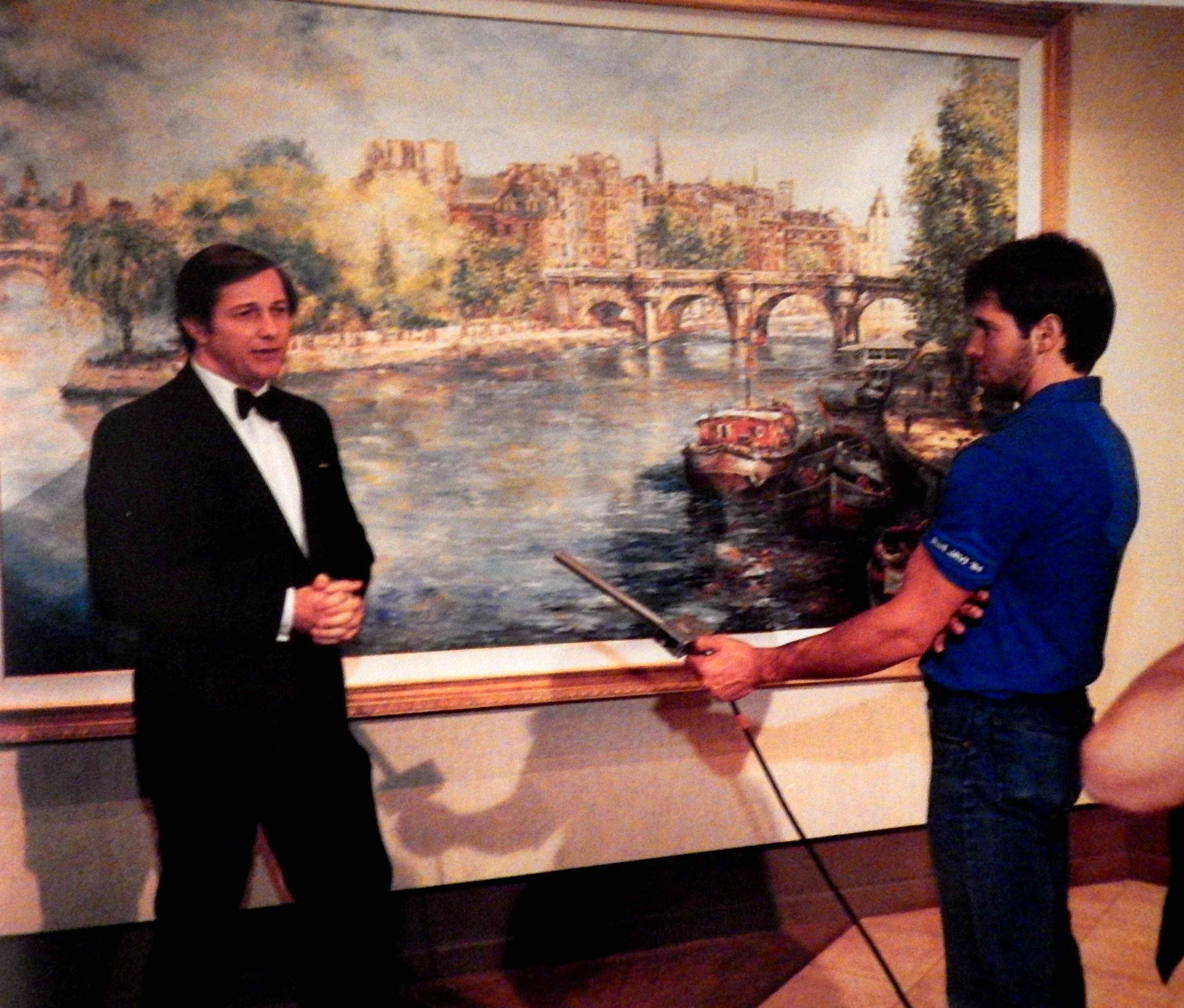
A.B. Makk interviewed in front of "Spirit of Paris" Collaborative Painting, 1985

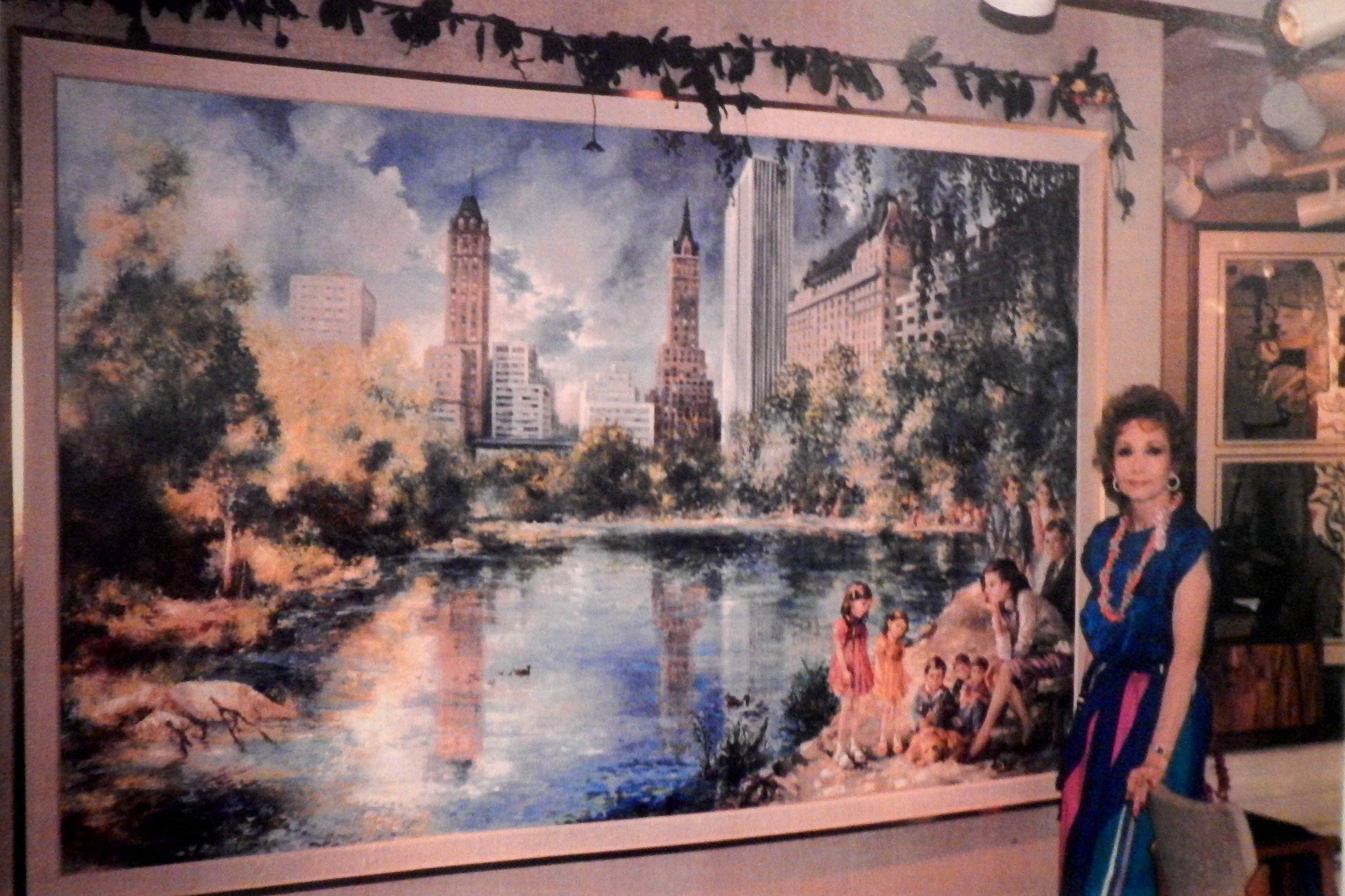
Eva Makk standing with "Trilogy" collaborative painting, 1986

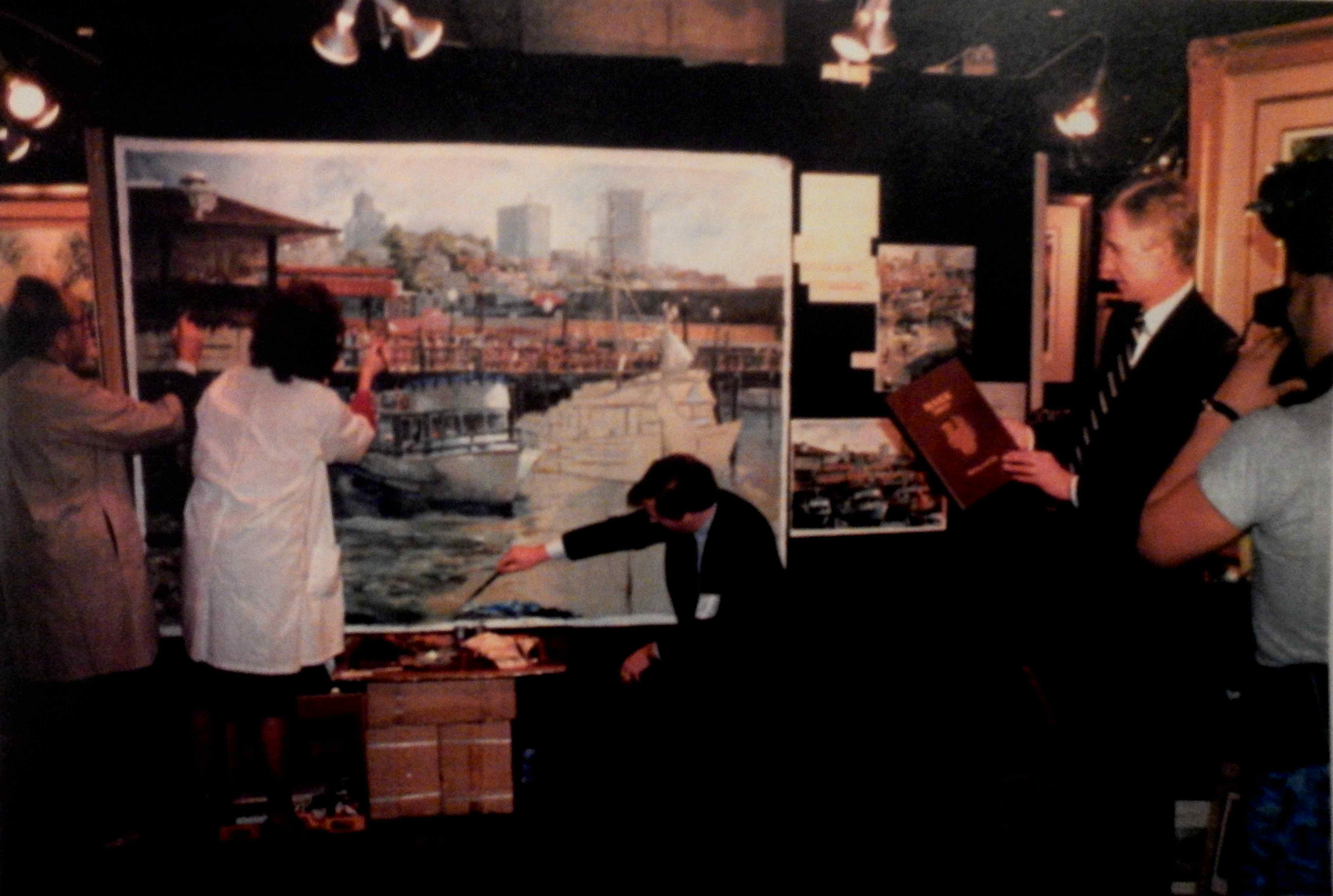
Makks giving demonstration of collaborative painting "Fisherman's Wharf" for CNN at ArtExpo, 1988

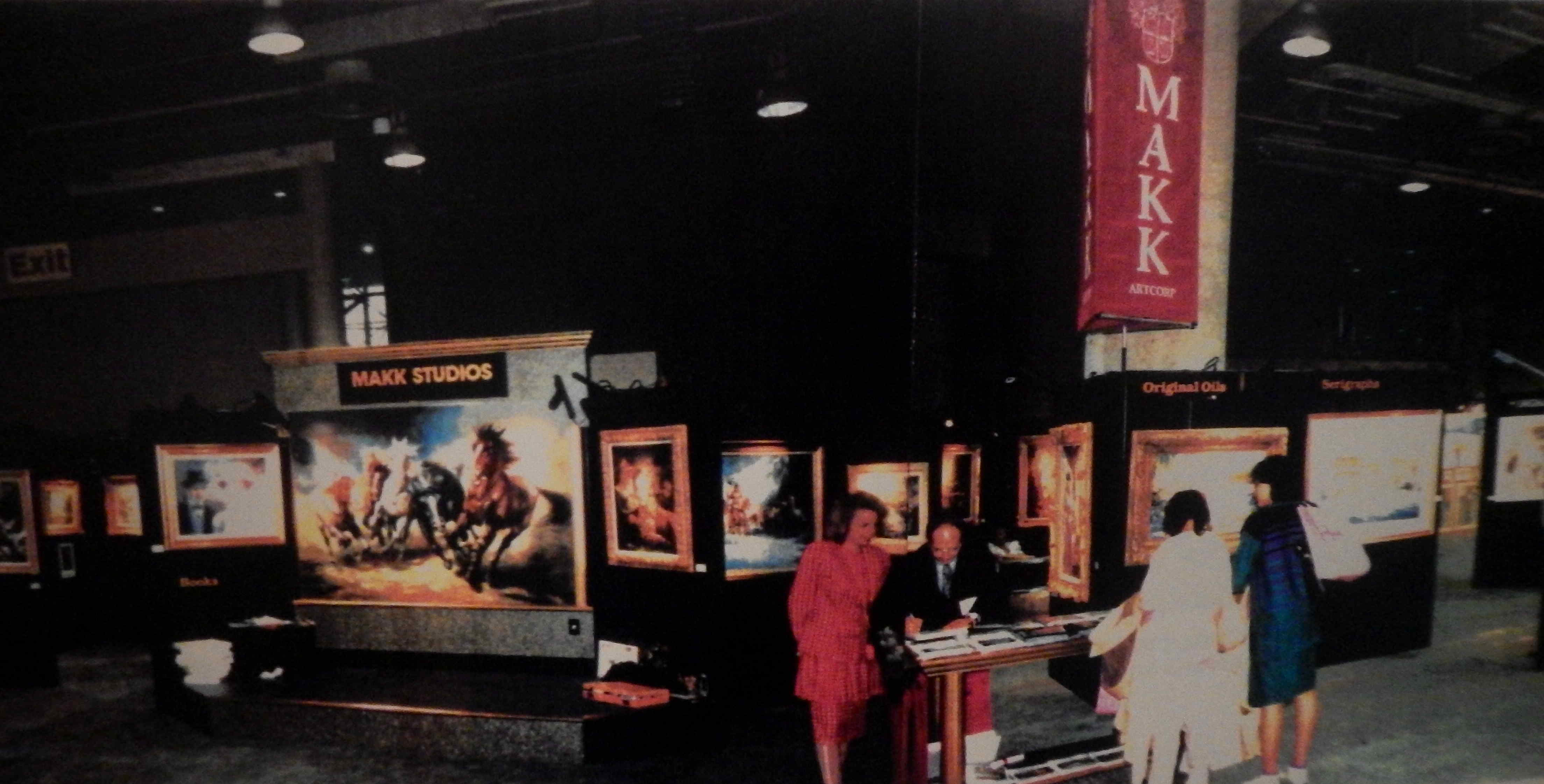
Makk Studios Display at ArtExpo-NY, 1989

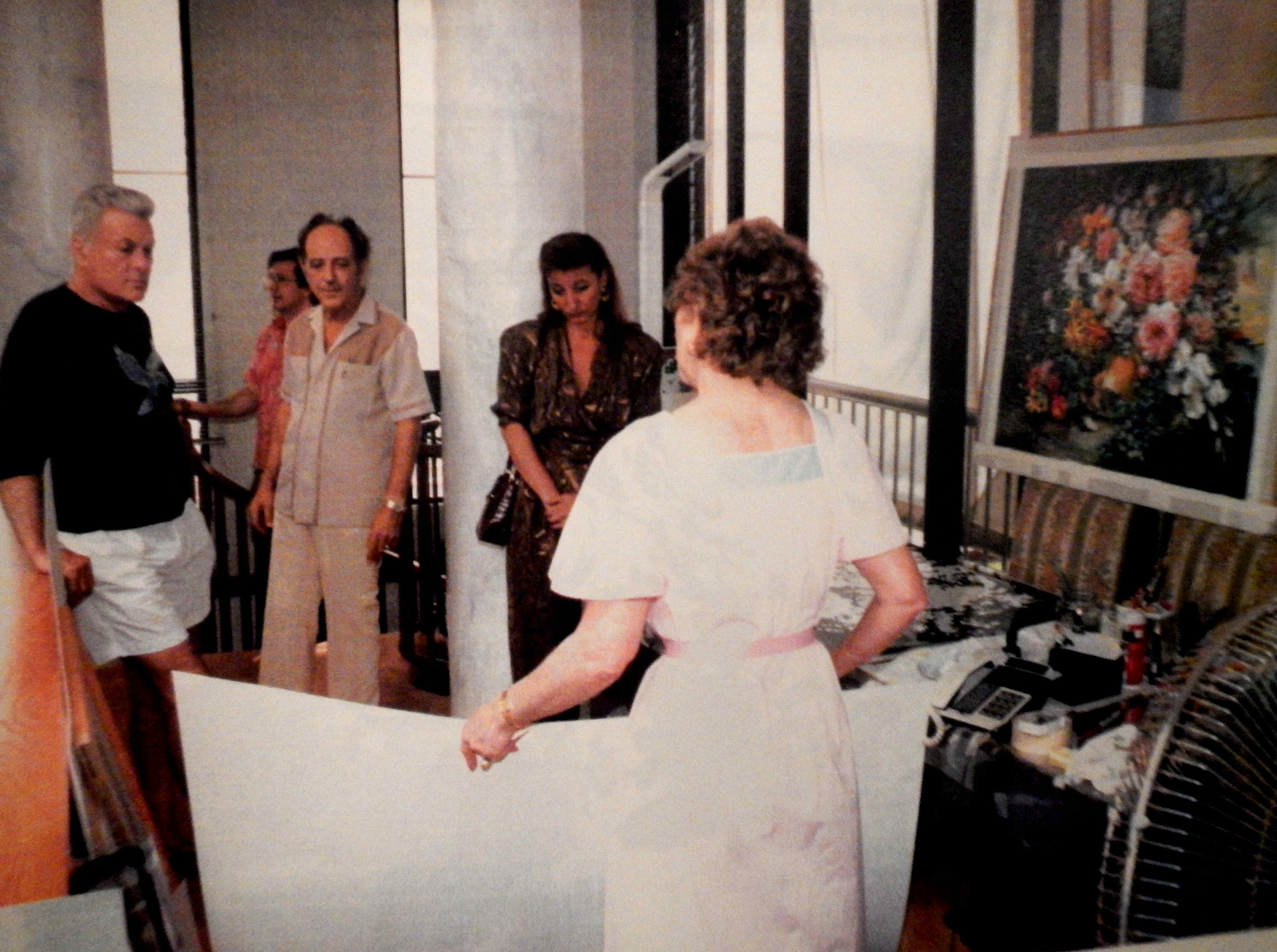
Eva Makk showing Tony Curtis serigraph at Makk Studios

== Significant collaborative work ==
- Trilogy (1985), 5'X7' by Eva, Americo, A.B.
- Spirit of Paris (1986), 5'X8' by Eva, Americo, A.B.
- American Epic (1987), 5'X7' by Eva, Americo, A.B.
- California Gold (1987), 5'X7' by Eva, Americo, A.B.
- Celebrity Sports Composition (1987), 4'X6', by Eva, Americo, A.B.
- Fisherman's Wharf (1988), 5'X7' by Eva Americo, A.B.
- "Living Colors" (1999), 7'X5' Eva and Americo
- "Courage" (2013) 60"X40", Eva and Americo

== Museum collections, public displays and media ==
- Coutts Museum of Art, Eldorado, KS, (The largest public Makk painting collection in the United States) (http://couttsmuseum.org/)
- The Museum of Hungarian Military History in Budapest, Hungary. (Historical Portraits)
- Ronald Reagan Presidential Library, Simi Valley, CA (Portraits of Ronald and Nancy Reagan) (https://www.reaganfoundation.org/library-museum/)
- Vatican Museum, Rome, Italy. (Portrait of Cardinal Jozsef Mindszenty)
- Palacio Rio Negro, Palace of the Governor in Manaus, Brazil. Four Mural Paintings including Chief Ajuricaba.
- World's Fair, 1964 Paris Pavilion in New York.
- World's Fair, 1965, Paris Pavilion in New York.
- Americo and Eva Makk with Paintings Displayed on NBC-TV, Broadcast date December 4, 1966 (Commemorating network going to full-color programming).
- Johnny Gilbert Show, WLWD TV, Dayton, OH, 1967 (Americo and Eva Makk executing painting on camera).
- United States Senate Rotunda Solo Exhibition, Washington, D.C., May 14–18, 1984, (Retrospective of Work)
- United States Senate Rotunda Exhibition, Washington, D.C.,1986, (Works Commemorating 30th Anniversary of the 1956 Hungarian Revolution)
- Hawaii Five-0, Season 8, Episode 12, "Ka Ho Pu Nui' Ana", CBS Corporation, broadcast date January 5, 2018 (four paintings filmed).
- Hawaii Five-0, Season 8, Episode 24, "Ka Lala Kaukonakona Haki'Ole", CBS Corporation, broadcast date May 11, 2018 (two paintings filmed).
- Hawaii Five-0, Season 9, Episode 3, "Mimiki Ke Kai Papa Leho", CBS Corporation, broadcast date October 12, 2018 (two paintings filmed).
- Hawaii Five-0, Season 9, Episode 19, "Pupuhi Ka He's O Kai Uli", CBS Corporation, broadcast date March 15, 2019 (two paintings filmed).
- Hawaii Five-0, Season 10, Episode 9, "Ka la'au kumu 'ole o Kahilikolo", CBS Corporation, broadcast date November 22, 2019 (four paintings filmed).
- Hawaii Five-0, Season 10, Episode 13, "Loa'a pono ka 'iole i ka punana", CBS Corporation, broadcast date January 10, 2020 (four paintings filmed).
- Hawaii Five-0, Season 10, Episode 20, "He Puhe'e Miki", CBS Corporation, broadcast date March 13, 2020 (one painting filmed).

== Ecclesiastical work, 1955 to 2001 ==
- Queen of Peace Church, Aurora, Colorado, USA: Murals
- Memorial United Church of Christ, Dayton, Ohio, USA: Mural
- Chapel of the Immaculate Conception, Cornwall, New York, USA: Murals and ceiling
- Cathedral Metropolitana de Manaus, Brazil: Murals and the world's largest single-theme ceiling
- Igreja Sagrada Familia, Sao Paulo, Brazil: Tinted Glass
- Igreja Santa Barbara, Sao Paulo, Brazil: Murals and ceilings
- Igreja San Jose, Victoria, Espirito Santo, Brazil: Mural
- Basilica de San Francisco, Sobral, Ceara, Brazil: Murals and ceiling
- Igreja Nossa Senhora da Conceicao, Areia, Paraiba, Brazil: Murals and ceiling* Igreja Nossa Senhora dos Remedios, Sousa, Paraiba, Brazil: Murals and ceiling
- Igreja Nossa Senhora da Conceição, Itaporanga, Paraiba, Brazil: Murals and ceiling
- Igreja Nossa Senhora do Carmo, Araraquara, Sao Paulo, Brazil: “Via Sacra” (Stations of the Cross)
- Igreja San Sebastiano, Taquaritinga, Sao Paulo, Brazil: Murals* Palacio do Bispo, San Carlos, Sao Paulo, Brazil: Murals and ceiling
- Basilica Nossa Senhora do Rosario, Ponta Grossa, Parana, Brazil: Murals and cupola* Igreja da Coroacao, Jau, Sao Paulo, Brazil: Murals

== Awards and honors ==
Makk was awarded with the Hungarian Golden Cross of Merit in 2013.
