= Carlos Eduardo (footballer, born 1987) =

Brazilian footballer

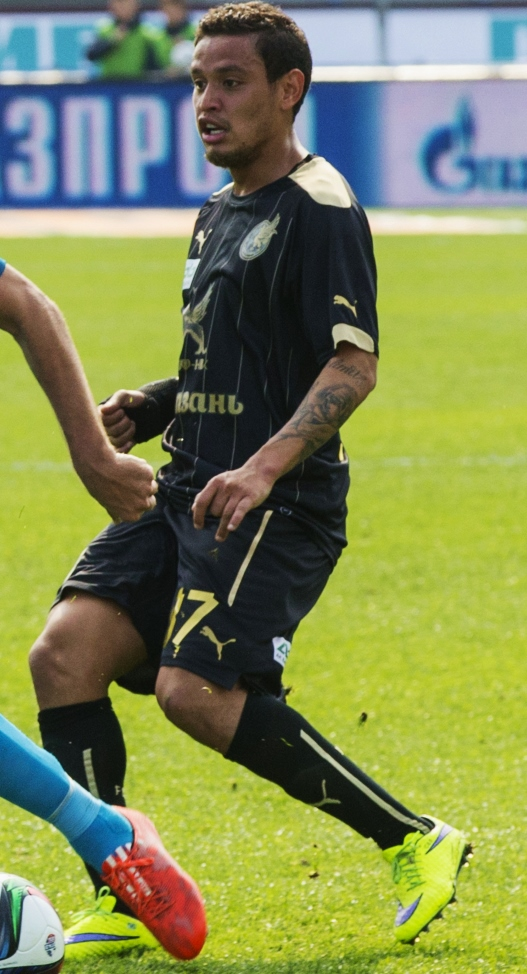
- Carlos Eduardo with Rubin Kazan in 2015

Personal information
- Full name: Carlos Eduardo Marques
- Date of birth: 18 July 1987 (age 39)
- Place of birth: Ajuricaba, Brazil
- Height: 1.72 m (5 ft 8 in)
- Positions: Attacking midfielder; winger

Youth career
- 2001–2006: Grêmio

Senior career*
Years	Team	Apps	(Gls)
2007	Grêmio	36	(7)
2007–2010	1899 Hoffenheim	80	(18)
2010–2016	Rubin Kazan	46	(6)
2013–2014	→ Flamengo (loan)	24	(0)
2016–2017	Atlético Mineiro	10	(0)
2017	Vitória	13	(1)
2018	Paraná	9	(0)
2018–2019	Coritiba	5	(0)
2020	Juventude	4	(1)
2020–2021	Brasiliense	10	(0)

International career
2007	Brazil U20	3	(0)
2009–2010	Brazil	6	(0)
- * Club domestic league appearances and goals

Carlos Eduardo Marques (born 18 July 1987), known as Carlos Eduardo, is a Brazilian former footballer who played as an attacking midfielder or a winger. He is known for speed, good passing, dribbling and strong shots play.

== Club career ==
=== Grêmio ===
Born in Ajuricaba, Brazil, Carlos Eduardo lived in the city until moving to Porto Alegre at age fourteen to join Grêmio's youth system, where he began his career and meet his future teammate, Lucas Leiva. Carlos Eduardo turned professional at the age of sixteen. He later reflected in an interview with Deutsche Welle on his background, saying: "In the south, it's a little cold too. And for me, gaucho football is a little tougher than paulista and carioca, and that helped me a lot. I had a very good school, which was Grêmio. An excellent school, forming great players, like Ronaldinho, Lucas, Anderson. Grêmio was a very beautiful story, I managed to win there and the club gave me the experience to come here to be able to show my football naturally."

Carlos Eduardo was spotted first by a Real Madrid scout in 2005, but Real Madrid decided not to sign him as they thought he would need time to adapt to Spanish football. Despite not signing for Real Madrid, Carlos Eduardo continued to develop at Grêmio and then signed a three–year contract with the club. At the start of the 2007 season, he was called up to the Grêmio's first team squad. Carlos Eduardo made his debut for Grêmio, starting a match and played 68 minutes before being substituted, as the club lost 1–0 against Cerro Porteño in the Copa Libertadores match on 15 February 2007. He also played in both legs of the final of the Campeonato Gaúcho against Juventude and scored twice in the first leg, as the club won 7–4 on aggregate to win the tournament. Carlos Eduardo then scored on his league debut on 20 May 2007 and earned himself a Man of the Match, in a 2–0 win over Fluminense. He played in both legs of the Copa Libertadores semi–finals against Santos and showed clever footwork, rapid turns and dangerous crosses from the left wing, scoring a memorable goal in the semi-final that would turn out be the clinching goal and Grêmio went on to win through away goal following a 3–3 draw on aggregate. In the Copa Libertadores Finals, Carlos Eduardo played in both legs, when his team Grêmio lost to Boca Juniors 5–0 on aggregate. He then later added two more goals for the side, scoring against Náutico and Corinthians. Having established himself in the starting eleven for the side, Carlos Eduardo made thirty–six appearances and scoring seven times in all competitions.

His breakthrough in the first team at the club and impressive form saw him linked with German club 1899 Hoffenheim. At first, Grêmio rejected two bids from the German side. Upon leaving Grêmio, Carlos Eduardo stated he would like to return to the club one day.

=== 1899 Hoffenheim ===
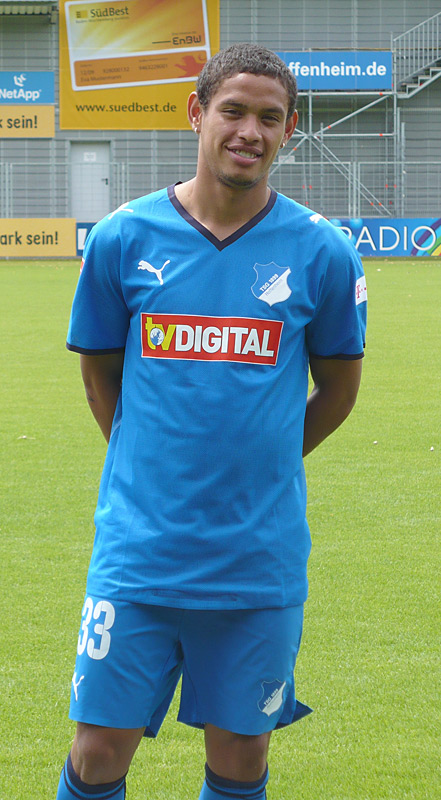
Carlos Eduardo as a 1899 Hoffenheim player.

On 29 August 2007, Carlos Eduardo moved for a transfer fee of 8 million euro to 1899 Hoffenheim on a five-year deal and was joined up by Demba Ba. His transfer fee was a record move made in the 2. Bundesliga until it was broken by Massimo Bruno in 2014.

Carlos Eduardo made his debut for 1899 Hoffenheim on 3 September 2007 in a 3–2 loss against Freiburg. This was followed up by scoring his first goal for the club, in a 3–1 win over Osnabrück. However, during a match against Paderborn on 21 September 2007, he suffered an abdominal muscle strain that saw him substituted at half time, as 1899 Hoffenheim won 2–0. After missing one match, Carlos Eduardo returned to the starting line–up, helping the side win 1–0 against 1. FSV Mainz 05 on 30 September 2007. In a follow–up match against FC Augsburg, he scored his second goal for the club, in a 2–2 draw and was named Man of the Match by Kicker. Despite being sidelined on two more occasions halfway through the first half of the season, he continued to be a regular player in the first team, playing in the midfield position. Carlos Eduardo then played an important role against SC Freiburg on 22 February 2008, setting up two goals, in a 2–0 win. This was followed up by scoring two goals in the next two matches against Osnabrück and Paderborn. On 6 May 2008, Carlos Eduardo received a three-game suspension after video evidence showed him kicking 1. FC Köln player Roda Antar in the face, which saw Hoffenheim lost 3–1. Despite this, Carlos Eduardo led the club to promotion to the Bundesliga for the first time in history and at 2. Bundesliga, he was considered the best dribbler in the league. At the end of the 2007–08 season, Carlos Eduardo scored six times in twenty–five appearances in all competitions.

At the start of the 2008–09 season, Carlos Eduardo returned from suspension and played his first Bundesliga match in the opening game of the season, in a 3–0 win over Energie Cottbus on 16 August 2008. He scored his first Bundesliga goal in a 4–1 win over Borussia Dortmund on 21 September 2008. Since the start of the 2008–09 season, Carlos Eduardo started in the first seven matches before suffering from a concussion that kept him out for one match. He then returned from injury and came on as a 75th-minute substitute, in a 2–1 win against Eintracht Frankfurt on 4 October 2008. Carlos Eduardo then set up two goals in the next two matches against Hannover 96 and Hamburger SV before scoring his third goal of the season and provided assist for Demba Ba in a 3–1 win over Bochum on 29 October 2008. He then added two more goals by the end of the year. However, on 14 January 2009, Carlos Eduardo was in a confrontation with Ivica Olić after he allegedly punched Olić during a friendly match between 1899 Hoffenheim and Hamburger SV which Hoffenheim lost 2–0. After the match, Carlos Eduardo, like Olić, were given a two match ban. After serving a two match suspension, he returned to the starting line–up against Bayer Leverkusen on 13 February 2009, starting the whole game, as they lost 4–1. It wasn't until on 14 March 2009 when Carlos Eduardo scored his fourth goal of the season, in a 1–1 draw against Eintracht Frankfurt. However, in a match against Bochum on 11 April 2009, Carlos Eduardo was given a red card after elbowing Philipp Bönig in a 3–0 loss. As a result of violent conduct, he was given a five match ban. After serving five-game suspension, Carlos Eduardo scored and provided assist for Demba Ba, once again in a 2–2 draw against Bayern Munich and did the same thing in the last game of the season when he scored twice and provided an assist for Ba in a 3–2 win over Schalke 04 in the last game of the season. Despite being on the sidelines on three occasions, due to injury and suspension, Carlos Eduardo continued to be a first team regular, as the club finished at seventh place in the league. Carlos Eduardo finished the 2008–09 season, making twenty–seven appearances and scoring eight times in all competitions.

Ahead of the 2009–10 season, Carlos Eduardo was linked with a move with Russian side Zenit Saint Petersburg after the club made 15 million bid for him in the summer transfer window. However, Carlos Eduardo decided to stay at the club by extending his contract, until 2013, thus ending transfer speculations. Carlos Eduardo started the 2009–10 season well when he scored in a 2–0 win over Hannover 96 on 29 August 2009. Since the start of the 2009–10 season, Carlos Eduardo continued to establish himself in the starting eleven for the side, playing in the midfield position. He then scored two more goals by the end of the first half of the season. Carlos Eduardo later added two more goals later in the 2009–10 season. He later helped the club finish eleventh place in the league. Carlos Eduardo played thirty–three matches and scored five times in the 2009–10 season and played almost every match except the one against Bayern Munich, due to injury.

In the 2010–11 season, Carlos Eduardo continued attract interests from clubs and was told by then Brazil Manager Mano Menezes that he needed to leave Hoffenheim for a bigger club in order to be in the national team. Weeks before leaving the club, he made his last appearance for Hoffenheim in the DFB-Pokal in a 4–0 win over Hansa Rostock amid of the transfer speculation.

=== Rubin Kazan ===
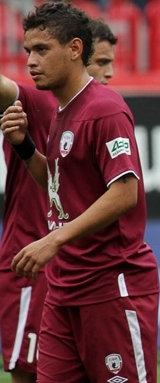
Carlos Eduardo playing for Rubin Kazan.

On 24 August 2010, Carlos Eduardo was transferred to the Russian Premier League champions Rubin Kazan for a fee of 20 million euro over 18 months and signed a four-year contract. Because of his move to Rubin Kazan, Grêmio would be entitled 20% of the transfer fee.

On 11 September 2010, Carlos Eduardo made his Rubin Kazan debut and scored twice in a 3–0 win over Amkar Perm. For his performance, he was included in the Team of the Week in Matchday 20. Three days later, on 14 September 2010, Carlos Eduardo made his UEFA Champions League debut, starting a match and played 77 minutes before being substituted, in a 1–0 loss against Copenhagen. However, despite his good start, he suffered a serious knee injury in November during training and was sidelined for the rest of the 2010 season. Despite this, Carlos Eduardo made eight appearances and scoring two times in all competitions.

It was reported from Sports Express on 30 September 2011 that Carlos Eduardo made his return to training after being sidelined for almost ten months. He then spent the next rest of 2011 training with FC Rubin Kazan to regain his fitness. By January 2012, Carlos Eduardo continuously suffered pain in his knee while training at the club's training camp, resulting in an operation keeping him out of action for three or four months. In May 2012, he had recovered from his injury, but three months later he suffered a sore throat which kept him out of action for some weeks.

At the start of the 2012–13 season, he made his first appearance in two years, starting the match before being substituted at half time, as Rubin Kazan lost 1–0 against Lokomotiv Moscow on 15 September 2012. After the match, manager Kurban Berdyev was happy for him to return, stating "For the first time, he has done quite well". After his return, Carlos Eduardo struggled to fight for his place in the first team, due to loss of form, as well as, his own injury concern. In a match against Volga Nizhny Novgorod on 26 November 2012, Carlos Eduardo was involved in an incident with Aleksei Sapogov during the match. As a result, Carlos Eduardo apologised to Volga supporters for his action and Sapogov ended up banned for three matches. Carlos Eduardo's action was criticised and at one point, described as "acting like a girl". Because of his struggle to fight for his first team place, Carlos Eduardo said he's open to be loaned out to get regular first team football. By the time Carlos Eduardo was loaned out, he made five appearances in all competitions for the 2012–13 season.

After his loan spell at Flamengo came to an end, Carlos Eduardo returned to the first team ahead of the 2014–15 season. Having not appeared in the first league matches of the season, he made his first Rubin Kazan appearance in almost two years, coming on as a substitute for Pavel Mogilevets in the 78th minute, in a 2–1 win over CSKA Moscow on 23 August 2014. After making his return, Carlos Eduardo scored two goals in two games against Torpedo Moscow and Mordovia (which he also scored again in another encounter). In the January transfer window, Carlos Eduardo was linked to a move to German club's Schalke 04 and Köln. Köln made a 3.5 million euro bid for him, but the move was rejected. After this, Köln's interests signing Carlos Eduardo ended. Following this, he continued to regain his first team place, playing in the midfield position for the rest of the 2014–15 season. Carlos Eduardo then set up three goals in three matches between 21 March 2015 and 7 April 2015. Despite being sidelined on three more occasions during the season, he ended the season, making twenty-two appearances and scoring three times for the club.

At the start of the 2015–16 season, Carlos Eduardo managed to regain his first team slot at Rubin Kazan. It wasn't until on 27 August 2015 when he scored the only goal of the game against FK Rabotnički to help the side qualify for the UEFA Europa League Group Stage. Carlos Eduardo then scored his first league goal of the season and set up the club's second goal of the game, in a 3–1 win over Lokomotiv Moscow on 12 September 2015. As a result, his goal against Lokomotiv Moscow resulted in him being voted September's Goal of the Month by Rubin Kazan's supporters. After expressing his desire to leave Rubin Kazan in the January transfer window, he was on a verge of moving back to his old club, Hoffenheim, but the move collapsed after both parties could not agree on his salary. Carlos Eduardo stayed at the club for the rest of the season and made a handful appearances for Rubin Kazan until he dropped from the first team for the rest of the season. It was announced on 19 April 2016 that Carlos Eduardo and the club reached an agreement to terminate his contract, ending his six-year-spell. By the time he departed from Rubin Kazan, Carlos Eduardo ended the 2015–16 season making twenty–five appearances and scoring two times in all competitions.

=== Clube de Regatas do Flamengo (loan) ===
On 25 January 2013, Carlos Eduardo returned to Brazil after a five-year absence by joining Flamengo on loan and stayed for one and a half year, until 30 June 2014, while also extending his contract with Rubin Kazan until the summer of 2016. Upon joining Flamengo, Carlos Eduardo was presented with a number ten shirt ahead of a new season. But was given number twenty shirt instead, as Gabriel Santana Pinto took number ten shirt.

Carlos Eduardo made his Flamengo debut on 6 April 2013, in a 1–1 draw against Duque de Caxias, but suffered a muscle injury in the process. After a treatment, it was announced that Carlos Eduardo would be out for a month. After recovering from injury, he made his league debut in the opening game of the season, coming on as a substitute in the 75th minute, in a 0–0 draw against Santos. However, Carlos Eduardo struggled to regain his first team place, he was mainly put on the substitute bench and made twenty–four appearances for Flamengo. Despite this, Carlos helped the club win the Copa do Brasil, having played both legs in a 3–1 win against Athletico Paranaense.

Though he helped the club win the Campeonato Carioca at the start of the season, Carlos Eduardo made only two appearances for the club. On 14 May 2014, Carlos Eduardo had his loan contract with Flamengo terminated, just one month before it was about to expire.

=== Atlético Mineiro ===
The day after leaving Rubin Kazan, it was announced on 20 April 2016, Carlos Eduardo made his return to Brazil permanently, signing for Atlético Mineiro, He became the club's ninth signing of the season.

On 14 May 2016, Carlos Eduardo made his Atlético Mineiro debut, in the opening game of the season, where he played 56 minutes before being substituted, in a 1–0 win over Santos. After the match, he stated his satisfaction to make his debut. However, Carlos Eduardo found his first team opportunities following an injury and was placed on the substitute bench for the next four months. It wasn't until on 8 September 2016 when he returned to the starting line–up against Esporte Clube Vitória and set up the club's first goal of the game before being substituted, as the club won 2–1. In the last game of the season against São Paulo, Carlos Eduardo set up the club's only goal of the game, in a 2–1 loss. At the end of the 2016 season, he went on to make eleven appearances in all competitions.

However, in the 2017 season, Carlos Eduardo found his first team opportunities limited at Atlético Mineiro. It was announced on 2 June 2017 that his contract at the club was terminated.

=== Esporte Clube Vitória ===
After leaving Atlético Mineiro, it was announced on 27 June 2017 that Vitória signed Carlos Eduardo until the end of the 2017 season. However, the move was a controversial circumstances.

Carlos Eduardo made his Esporte Clube Vitória debut, starting a match and played 57 minutes before being substituted, in a 0–0 draw against Bahia on 2 July 2017. He then made five more starts throughout July. However, Carlos Eduardo found his first team opportunities limited, due to being on the substitute bench for the rest of the season. Despite this, he scored his first goal for the club against Flamengo in the last game of the season, but was sent–off at the last minutes, as Esporte Clube Vitória lost 2–1. At the end of the 2017 season, Carlos Eduardo made twelve appearances and scoring once in all competitions. It was announced on 8 January 2018 that he won't be staying at Esporte Clube Vitória.

=== Paraná Clube ===
It was announced on 16 February 2018 that Carlos Eduardo signed for Paraná for the 2018 season.

Carlos Eduardo made his Paraná debut, starting the whole game, in a 1–0 loss against São Paulo in the opening game of the season. However, he found his first team opportunities limited, mostly coming on from the substitute bench. It was announced on 7 August 2018 that Carlos Eduardo's contract with the club was terminated. By the time he departed from Paraná Clube, he made nine appearances for the side in all competitions.

=== Coritiba ===
It was announced on 13 August 2018 that Coritiba signed Carlos Eduardo until May 2019.

Carlos Eduardo made his Coritiba debut, coming on as a 62nd-minute substitute, in a 1–0 loss against Atlético Clube Goianiense on 18 August 2018. However, during a 2–0 loss against Oeste Futebol Clube on 24 August 2018, he suffered a muscle injury in the 13th minute, resulting in his substitution and was sidelined for two months. It wasn't until on 17 October 2018 when Carlos Eduardo returned to the first team, coming on as an 82nd-minute substitute, in a 1–1 draw against Centro Sportivo Alagoano. However against Paysandu on 27 October 2018, he was sent–off for a second bookable offence at the last minutes, as they drew 1–1. Following this, it was announced that Carlos Eduardo was sidelined for the rest of the 2018 season. At the end of the 2018 season, he went on to make five appearances in all competitions.

However, it was announced on 13 March 2019 that Carlos Eduardo's contract with Coritiba was terminated.

=== Juventude ===
It was announced on 10 June 2020 that Carlos Eduardo signed for Juventude until the end of the 2020 season, having been a free agent for over a year.

=== Brasiliense ===
In 2021, Carlos Eduardo moved to Brasiliense competing in Série D.

== International career ==
After making three appearances for Brazil U20, it was announced on 27 October 2009 that Carlos Eduardo received his first call up for the Seleção. Carlos Eduardo said he was in tears upon learning that he was called up for the national team.

It wasn't until on 14 November 2009 when Carlos Eduardo made his Brazil debut, coming on as an 81st-minute substitute for goal scorer Nilmar, who scored the only goal of the game, in a 1–0 win against England. After the injuries of Luís Fabiano and Elano, Carlos Eduardo and Grafite were brought into the squad against Republic of Ireland, appearing as an 84th-minute substitute, winning 1–0 on 2 March 2010.

In May 2010, Dunga used all the players of Ireland match to form the 23-men provisional 2010 FIFA World Cup squad, except Adriano and Carlos Eduardo, and added Luís Fabiano, Elano and Gomes back to the squad. Carlos Eduardo remained in the squad, but as one of the seven backup players for the main squad. It wasn't until 23 September 2010, when Carlos Eduardo was called up for the national team. He later made two more appearances for Brazil by the end of the year.

== Personal life ==
Carlos Eduardo is friends with Wellington Luís de Sousa since they were fifteen while being at Grêmio. In addition to speaking Portuguese, he also speaks German, having learned the language during his time at Germany.

Carlos Eduardo's father was an electrician and later stopped working around the same time his son became a footballer. Eduardo has used a significant amount of his salary to support his family. Carlos Eduardo is Christian, having stated he read the Bible and do the sign of the Cross before playing. While playing for Rubin Kazan, Carlos Eduardo resided in Kazan and described the city as "safe".

== Honours ==
Grêmio

- Campeonato Gaúcho: 2007

Flamengo

- Copa do Brasil: 2013
- Campeonato Carioca: 2014

Atlético Mineiro

- Campeonato Mineiro: 2017
