= 2007 Campeonato Gaúcho =

Campeonato Gaúcho
- Season: 2007
- Champions: Grêmio
- Relegated: Glória; Gaúcho; Guarani-VA; São José-CS
- Copa do Brasil: Grêmio; Juventude; Internacional; Ulbra (Copa FGF 2006 runners-up)
- Série C: Caxias; Esportivo; Ulbra (Copa FGF 2006 runners-up)
- Matches played: 152
- Goals scored: 428 (2.82 per match)
- Top goalscorer: Vítor Hugo (Veranópolis) – 13 goals
- Biggest home win: Veranópolis 7-1 Gaúcho (March 18, 2007)
- Biggest away win: Guarani-VA 0–4 Grêmio (February 11, 2007); Brasil de Pelotas 0-4 15 de Novembro (March 4, 2007)
- Highest scoring: São Luiz 4-5 Grêmio (March 11, 2007)

The 87th season of the Campeonato Gaúcho kicked off on January 20, 2007 and ended on May 6, 2007. The competition began with 18 clubs divided into two groups. Even before the end of first stage, Glória, Gaúcho, Guarani de Venâncio Aires and São José de Cachoeira do Sul were already relegated. The two biggest clubs of Rio Grande do Sul would not meet at the final, as Internacional were eliminated in the first stage. Holders Grêmio won the title once more after beating Juventude. That was the 35th title in the history of the club.

== Participating teams ==
Club	Home location	Previous season
15 de Novembro	Campo Bom	12th
Brasil	Pelotas	16th
Caxias	Caxias do Sul	4th
Esportivo	Bento Gonçalves	14th
Gaúcho	Passo Fundo	13th
Glória	Vacaria	17th
Grêmio	Porto Alegre	1st
Guarani	Venâncio Aires	2nd (Second level)
Guarany	Bagé	1st (Second level)
Internacional	Porto Alegre	2nd
Juventude	Caxias do Sul	3rd
Novo Hamburgo	Novo Hamburgo	6th
São José	Cachoeira do Sul	9th
São José	Porto Alegre	5th
São Luiz	Ijuí	18th
Ulbra	Canoas	11th
Veranópolis	Veranópolis	7th
Santa Cruz	Santa Cruz do Sul	8th

== System ==
The championship would have four stages:

- First stage: The 18 teams were divided in 2 groups of 9 teams each. They played against each other inside their groups in a double round-robin system. After 18 rounds, the top team of each group qualified to the Semifinals, the second and third-placed teams advanced to the Second round and the bottom two teams from each group were relegated to the Second Level.
- Second stage: The Second and third-placed teams of each group would face each other in a single match to define the two teams that would qualify to the Semifinals.
- Semifinals: The Second stage winners and the Group winners were divided in 2 groups of 2 teams each and they played in a double round-robin system. Teams with best overall record played the second leg at home.
- Finals: Semifinals winners played in two matches to define the Champions. The team with best overall record played the second leg at home.

== Championship ==
=== First stage ===
==== Group 1 ====
Pos	Team	Pld	W	D	L	GF	GA	GD	Pts	Qualification or relegation
1	Juventude	16	10	2	4	28	16	+12	32	Qualified to Semifinals
2	Ulbra	16	9	4	3	27	17	+10	31	Qualified to Second stage
3	Veranópolis	16	7	4	5	30	22	+8	25	Qualified to Second stage
4	Internacional	16	7	4	5	15	16	−1	25	
5	Guarany de Bagé	16	6	6	4	19	21	−2	24	
6	Novo Hamburgo	16	6	5	5	27	21	+6	23	
7	Santa Cruz	16	4	7	5	22	20	+2	19	
8	Glória	16	2	4	10	18	26	−8	10	Relegated
9	Gaúcho	16	1	4	11	9	36	−27	7	Relegated

Updated to match(es) played on April 4, 2007. Source: RSSSF.com
Rules for classification: 1) points; 2) wins; 3) goal difference; 4) number of goals scored.

==== Group 2 ====
Pos	Team	Pld	W	D	L	GF	GA	GD	Pts	Qualification or relegation
1	Grêmio	16	13	1	2	41	12	+29	40	Qualified to Semifinals
2	Esportivo	16	7	4	5	20	20	0	25	Qualified to Second stage
3	Caxias	16	7	3	6	21	17	+4	24	Qualified to Second stage
4	Brasil de Pelotas	16	5	6	5	23	26	−3	21	
5	15 de Novembro	16	5	5	6	19	22	−3	20	
6	São José de Porto Alegre	16	5	4	7	18	17	+1	19	
7	São Luiz	16	4	5	7	26	33	−7	17	
8	Guarani de Venâncio Aires	16	4	5	7	20	29	−9	17	Relegated
9	São José de Cachoeira do Sul	16	4	3	9	17	29	−12	15	Relegated

Updated to match(es) played on April 4, 2007. Source: RSSSF.com
Rules for classification: 1) points; 2) wins; 3) goal difference; 4) number of goals scored.

=== Second stage ===
Team 1	Score	Team 2
Ulbra	0–0 (2-4 pen.)	Caxias
Esportivo	1–3	Veranópolis

=== Semifinals ===
Team 1	Agg.	Team 2	1st leg	2nd leg
Veranópolis	2–3	Juventude	0–2	2–1
Caxias	3–4	Grêmio	3–0	0–4

=== Finals ===
Team 1	Agg.	Team 2	1st leg	2nd leg
Juventude	4–7	Grêmio	3–3	1–4

29 April 2007
Finals

Juventude	3 – 3	Grêmio
Wescley 32'; Cristiano 51'; Da Silva 79'		Carlos Eduardo 3', 33'; Tuta 90+1'

Alfredo Jaconi, Caxias do Sul
Attendance: 15,177
Referee: Vinícius Costa
6 May 2007
Finals

Grêmio	4 – 1	Juventude
Tcheco 15', 61'; Diego Souza 49'; Lúcio 68'		Gabriel 32'

Olímpico, Porto Alegre
Attendance: 47,676
Referee: Carlos Eugênio Simon
