= Ajuricaba =

Municipality of Rio Grande do Sul, Brazil

- Municipality
- Flag Coat of arms
- Motto: Terra do peixe cultivado
- Location within Rio Grande do Sul

- Location in Brazil
- Coordinates: 28°14′20.21″S 53°46′03.96″W
- Country: Brazil
- State: Rio Grande do Sul
- Founded: 08.11.1965

Area
  - Total: 322.7 km^{2} (124.6 sq mi)

Population (2020)
  - Total: 6,987
  - Density: 21.65/km^{2} (56.08/sq mi)
- Time zone: UTC−3 (BRT)
- Website: www.ajuricaba.rs.gov.br

Ajuricaba (Portuguese: [a.ʒu.ɾiˈka.bɐ]) is a municipality in the state of Rio Grande do Sul, Brazil.

== Geography ==
Ajuricaba is located at a latitude of 28°14'22" south and a longitude of 53°46'15" west, at an altitude of 336 meters.

== Transport ==
Ajuricaba can be accessed via RS-514 (which connects to BR-158), RS-155 and BR-285.

== Economy ==
Ajuricaba's economy is essentially focused on agriculture.

== See also ==
- List of municipalities in Rio Grande do Sul
