= 1996 Campeonato Gaúcho =

Campeonato Gaúcho
- Season: 1996
- Champions: Grêmio
- Relegated: Pratense; Rio Grande
- Copa do Brasil: Grêmio; Juventude; Internacional
- Série C: Brasil de Pelotas; Caxias; Pelotas; São Luiz
- Matches played: 233
- Goals scored: 589 (2.53 per match)
- Top goalscorer: Sandro Pires (Ypiranga de Erechim) – 12 goals
- Biggest home win: Aimoré 5-0 São Paulo (March 27, 1996); Internacional-SM 5-0 Palmeirense (April 17, 1996)
- Biggest away win: 14 de Julho 0-5 Santa Cruz (March 3, 1996)
- Highest scoring: Juventude 6-2 Brasil de Pelotas (May 19, 1996)

The 76th season of the Campeonato Gaúcho kicked off on February 2, 1996 and ended on June 30, 1996. Twenty-eight teams participated. Holders Grêmio beat Juventude in the finals and won their 31st title. Pratense and Rio Grande were relegated.

== Participating teams ==
| Club | Home location | Previous season |
|---|---|---|
| 14 de Julho | Santana do Livramento | 5th (Second level) |
| 15 de Novembro | Campo Bom | 20th |
| Aimoré | São Leopoldo | 21st |
| Atlético de Carazinho | Carazinho | 7th |
| Brasil | Pelotas | 15th |
| Brasil | Farroupilha | 6th |
| Caxias | Caxias do Sul | 10th |
| Esportivo | Bento Gonçalves | 8th |
| Glória | Vacaria | 9th |
| Grêmio | Porto Alegre | 1st |
| Grêmio | Santana do Livramento | 13th |
| Guarani | Venâncio Aires | 11th |
| Guarany | Garibaldi | 17th |
| Internacional | Porto Alegre | 2nd |
| Internacional | Santa Maria | 19th |
| Juventude | Caxias do Sul | 3rd |
| Palmeirense | Palmeira das Missões | 1st (Second level) |
| Passo Fundo | Passo Fundo | 18th |
| Pelotas | Pelotas | 14th |
| Pratense | Nova Prata | 3rd (Second level) |
| Rio Grande | Rio Grande | 7th (Second level) |
| São Luiz | Ijuí | 5th |
| São Paulo | Rio Grande | 6th (Second level) |
| Santa Cruz | Santa Cruz do Sul | 16th |
| Santo Ângelo | Santo Ângelo | 2nd (Second level) |
| Taquariense | Taquari | 4th (Second level) |
| Veranópolis | Veranópolis | 12th |
| Ypiranga | Erechim | 4th |

== System ==
The championship would have five stages:

- Division A: The 14 clubs were divided into two groups of seven. In the first round, teams from one group play against teams from the other group once. In the second round, the teams from each group played in single round-robin format against the others in their group. The four group winners, plus the two teams with the most points in the sum of the rounds qualified to the Second phase, while the two teams with the fewest points in the sum of the rounds would dispute the Division B in 1997.
- Division B: The twelve teams that had qualified to Division B in the previous year joined the two teams that had been promoted from the Second level, and were divided into two groups of seven, in which each team played the teams of its own group in a double round-robin system. the best four teams in each group qualified to the Second phase of that division, the leader of each group earning a bonus point, while the two worst teams in each group would dispute the Relegation Playoffs. In the second phase, the remaining eight teams would be divided into two groups of four, in which each team played the teams of its own group in a double round-robin system. The best team of each group would qualify to the Second phase of the championship, and to the Division A of the following year.
- Relegation Playoffs: The four teams that had qualified to this round played each other in a double round-robin format. The two teams with the fewest points were relegated.
- Second phase: The eight remaining teams were divided into two groups of four, in which each team played the teams of its own group in a double round-robin system. The best teams in each group qualified to the Semifinals.
- Finals: The Second phase group winners played a two-legged knockout tie to define the champions.

== Championship ==
=== Division A ===
==== First round ====
===== Group 1 =====
| Pos | Team | Pld | W | D | L | GF | GA | GD | Pts | Qualification or relegation |
|---|---|---|---|---|---|---|---|---|---|---|
| 1 | Internacional | 7 | 4 | 3 | 0 | 9 | 2 | +7 | 15 | Qualified |
| 2 | Caxias | 7 | 4 | 1 | 2 | 10 | 8 | +2 | 13 | |
| 3 | Glória | 7 | 3 | 1 | 3 | 5 | 7 | −2 | 10 | |
| 4 | Pelotas | 7 | 2 | 4 | 1 | 12 | 11 | +1 | 10 | |
| 5 | São Luiz | 7 | 2 | 3 | 2 | 7 | 8 | −1 | 9 | |
| 6 | Esportivo | 7 | 2 | 1 | 4 | 8 | 14 | −6 | 7 | |
| 7 | Guarani de Venâncio Aires | 7 | 1 | 0 | 6 | 4 | 17 | −13 | 3 | |

Updated to match(es) played on March 17, 1996. Source: RSSSF.com
Rules for classification: 1) points; 2) wins; 3) goal difference; 4) number of goals scored.

===== Group 2 =====
| Pos | Team | Pld | W | D | L | GF | GA | GD | Pts | Qualification or relegation |
|---|---|---|---|---|---|---|---|---|---|---|
| 1 | Grêmio | 7 | 6 | 1 | 0 | 20 | 2 | +18 | 19 | Qualified |
| 2 | Brasil de Farroupilha | 7 | 3 | 1 | 3 | 6 | 7 | −1 | 10 | |
| 3 | Veranópolis | 7 | 2 | 3 | 2 | 10 | 8 | +2 | 9 | |
| 4 | Ypiranga de Erechim | 7 | 2 | 3 | 2 | 7 | 5 | +2 | 9 | |
| 5 | Juventude | 7 | 2 | 2 | 3 | 11 | 9 | +2 | 8 | |
| 6 | Grêmio Santanense | 7 | 2 | 1 | 4 | 7 | 13 | −6 | 7 | |
| 7 | Atlético de Carazinho | 7 | 1 | 2 | 4 | 6 | 11 | −5 | 5 | |

Updated to match(es) played on March 17, 1996. Source: RSSSF.com
Rules for classification: 1) points; 2) wins; 3) goal difference; 4) number of goals scored.

==== Second round ====
===== Group 1 =====
| Pos | Team | Pld | W | D | L | GF | GA | GD | Pts | Qualification or relegation |
|---|---|---|---|---|---|---|---|---|---|---|
| 1 | Caxias | 6 | 4 | 1 | 1 | 12 | 7 | +5 | 13 | Qualified |
| 2 | São Luiz | 6 | 3 | 2 | 1 | 7 | 6 | +1 | 11 | |
| 3 | Glória | 6 | 3 | 1 | 2 | 10 | 8 | +2 | 10 | |
| 4 | Guarani de Venâncio Aires | 6 | 2 | 2 | 2 | 8 | 8 | 0 | 8 | |
| 5 | Esportivo | 6 | 2 | 0 | 4 | 11 | 12 | −1 | 6 | |
| 6 | Internacional | 6 | 1 | 3 | 2 | 5 | 6 | −1 | 6 | |
| 7 | Pelotas | 6 | 1 | 1 | 4 | 5 | 11 | −6 | 4 | |

Updated to match(es) played on May 5, 1996. Source: RSSSF.com
Rules for classification: 1) points; 2) wins; 3) goal difference; 4) number of goals scored.

===== Group 2 =====
| Pos | Team | Pld | W | D | L | GF | GA | GD | Pts | Qualification or relegation |
|---|---|---|---|---|---|---|---|---|---|---|
| 1 | Juventude | 6 | 3 | 2 | 1 | 14 | 6 | +8 | 11 | Qualified |
| 2 | Ypiranga de Erechim | 6 | 3 | 2 | 1 | 8 | 6 | +2 | 11 | |
| 3 | Grêmio Santanense | 6 | 2 | 2 | 2 | 8 | 8 | 0 | 8 | |
| 4 | Atlético de Carazinho | 6 | 2 | 2 | 2 | 7 | 8 | −1 | 8 | |
| 5 | Brasil de Farroupilha | 6 | 2 | 1 | 3 | 7 | 12 | −5 | 7 | |
| 6 | Grêmio | 6 | 1 | 3 | 2 | 5 | 5 | 0 | 6 | |
| 7 | Veranópolis | 6 | 1 | 2 | 3 | 5 | 9 | −4 | 5 | |

Updated to match(es) played on May 5, 1996. Source: RSSSF.com
Rules for classification: 1) points; 2) wins; 3) goal difference; 4) number of goals scored.

==== Final standings ====
| Pos | Team | Pld | W | D | L | GF | GA | GD | Pts | Qualification or relegation |
|---|---|---|---|---|---|---|---|---|---|---|
| 1 | Caxias | 13 | 8 | 2 | 3 | 22 | 15 | +7 | 26 | Qualified as group winners |
| 2 | Grêmio | 13 | 7 | 4 | 2 | 25 | 7 | +18 | 25 | Qualified as group winners |
| 3 | Internacional | 13 | 5 | 6 | 2 | 14 | 8 | +6 | 21 | Qualified as group winners |
| 4 | Glória | 13 | 6 | 2 | 5 | 15 | 15 | 0 | 20 | Qualified |
| 5 | Ypiranga de Erechim | 13 | 5 | 5 | 3 | 15 | 11 | +4 | 20 | Qualified |
| 6 | São Luiz | 13 | 5 | 5 | 3 | 14 | 14 | 0 | 20 | |
| 7 | Juventude | 13 | 5 | 4 | 4 | 25 | 15 | +10 | 19 | Qualified as group winners |
| 8 | Brasil de Farroupilha | 13 | 5 | 2 | 6 | 13 | 19 | −6 | 17 | |
| 9 | Grêmio Santanense | 13 | 4 | 3 | 6 | 15 | 21 | −6 | 15 | |
| 10 | Veranópolis | 13 | 3 | 5 | 5 | 15 | 16 | −1 | 14 | |
| 11 | Pelotas | 13 | 3 | 5 | 5 | 17 | 22 | −5 | 14 | |
| 12 | Esportivo | 13 | 4 | 1 | 8 | 19 | 26 | −7 | 13 | |
| 13 | Atlético de Carazinho | 13 | 3 | 4 | 6 | 13 | 19 | −6 | 13 | Withdrew after the end of the season |
| 14 | Guarani de Venâncio Aires | 13 | 3 | 2 | 8 | 12 | 25 | −13 | 11 | 1997 Division B |

Updated to match(es) played on May 5, 1996. Source: RSSSF.com
Rules for classification: 1) points; 2) wins; 3) goal difference; 4) number of goals scored.

=== Division B ===
==== Série 1 ====
| Pos | Team | Pld | W | D | L | GF | GA | GD | Pts | Qualification or relegation |
|---|---|---|---|---|---|---|---|---|---|---|
| 1 | Brasil de Pelotas | 12 | 6 | 4 | 2 | 18 | 14 | +4 | 22 | Qualified |
| 2 | Santa Cruz | 12 | 5 | 4 | 3 | 19 | 13 | +6 | 19 | Qualified |
| 3 | Taquariense | 12 | 4 | 5 | 3 | 14 | 12 | +2 | 17 | Qualified |
| 4 | Aimoré | 12 | 4 | 4 | 4 | 17 | 15 | +2 | 16 | Qualified |
| 5 | 14 de Julho | 12 | 5 | 1 | 6 | 14 | 19 | −5 | 16 | |
| 6 | 15 de Novembro | 12 | 3 | 3 | 6 | 16 | 20 | −4 | 12 | Relegation Playoffs |
| 7 | São Paulo | 12 | 3 | 3 | 6 | 11 | 16 | −5 | 12 | Relegation Playoffs |

Updated to match(es) played on April 7, 1996. Source: RSSSF.com
Rules for classification: 1) points; 2) wins; 3) goal difference; 4) number of goals scored.

==== Série 2 ====
| Pos | Team | Pld | W | D | L | GF | GA | GD | Pts | Qualification or relegation |
|---|---|---|---|---|---|---|---|---|---|---|
| 1 | Passo Fundo | 12 | 7 | 4 | 1 | 17 | 7 | +10 | 25 | Qualified |
| 2 | Internacional de Santa Maria | 12 | 7 | 1 | 4 | 18 | 12 | +6 | 22 | Qualified |
| 3 | Palmeirense | 12 | 6 | 3 | 3 | 11 | 9 | +2 | 21 | Qualified |
| 4 | Santo Ângelo | 12 | 5 | 3 | 4 | 15 | 12 | +3 | 18 | Qualified |
| 5 | Guarany de Garibaldi | 12 | 5 | 2 | 5 | 11 | 11 | 0 | 17 | |
| 6 | Rio Grande | 12 | 2 | 1 | 9 | 10 | 21 | −11 | 7 | Relegation Playoffs |
| 7 | Pratense | 12 | 1 | 4 | 7 | 7 | 17 | −10 | 7 | Relegation Playoffs |

Updated to match(es) played on April 7, 1996. Source: RSSSF.com
Rules for classification: 1) points; 2) wins; 3) goal difference; 4) number of goals scored.

==== Second phase ====
===== Série 3 =====
| Pos | Team | Pld | W | D | L | GF | GA | GD | Pts | Qualification or relegation |
|---|---|---|---|---|---|---|---|---|---|---|
| 1 | Brasil de Pelotas | 6 | 4 | 1 | 1 | 8 | 5 | +3 | 14 | Qualified;1997 Division A |
| 2 | Aimoré | 6 | 3 | 0 | 3 | 6 | 6 | 0 | 9 | Withdrew after the end of the season |
| 3 | Internacional de Santa Maria | 6 | 2 | 1 | 3 | 13 | 10 | +3 | 7 | |
| 4 | Palmeirense | 6 | 1 | 2 | 3 | 5 | 11 | −6 | 5 | |

Updated to match(es) played on May 5, 1996. Source: RSSSF.com
Rules for classification: 1) points; 2) wins; 3) goal difference; 4) number of goals scored.

===== Série 4 =====
| Pos | Team | Pld | W | D | L | GF | GA | GD | Pts | Qualification or relegation |
|---|---|---|---|---|---|---|---|---|---|---|
| 1 | Santo Ângelo | 6 | 4 | 1 | 1 | 9 | 6 | +3 | 13 | Qualified;1997 Division A |
| 2 | Santa Cruz | 6 | 3 | 0 | 3 | 10 | 8 | +2 | 9 | |
| 3 | Passo Fundo | 6 | 2 | 2 | 2 | 6 | 6 | 0 | 9 | |
| 4 | Taquariense | 6 | 1 | 1 | 4 | 6 | 11 | −5 | 4 | |

Updated to match(es) played on May 5, 1996. Source: RSSSF.com
Rules for classification: 1) points; 2) wins; 3) goal difference; 4) number of goals scored.

==== Relegation Playoffs ====
| Pos | Team | Pld | W | D | L | GF | GA | GD | Pts | Qualification or relegation |
|---|---|---|---|---|---|---|---|---|---|---|
| 1 | São Paulo | 6 | 4 | 0 | 2 | 5 | 5 | 0 | 12 | |
| 2 | 15 de Novembro | 6 | 3 | 1 | 2 | 11 | 7 | +4 | 10 | |
| 3 | Pratense | 6 | 3 | 1 | 2 | 9 | 7 | +2 | 10 | Relegated |
| 4 | Rio Grande | 6 | 0 | 2 | 4 | 3 | 9 | −6 | 2 (Note: Rio Grande lost the points of a 2-1 win against São Paulo) | Relegated |

Updated to match(es) played on May 12, 1996. Source: RSSSF.com
Rules for classification: 1) points; 2) wins; 3) goal difference; 4) number of goals scored.

=== Second phase ===
==== Group 1 ====
| Pos | Team | Pld | W | D | L | GF | GA | GD | Pts | Qualification or relegation |
|---|---|---|---|---|---|---|---|---|---|---|
| 1 | Juventude | 6 | 2 | 3 | 1 | 14 | 8 | +6 | 9 | Qualified |
| 2 | Internacional | 6 | 2 | 2 | 2 | 11 | 6 | +5 | 8 | |
| 3 | Ypiranga de Erechim | 6 | 2 | 2 | 2 | 9 | 13 | −4 | 8 | |
| 4 | Brasil de Pelotas | 6 | 2 | 1 | 3 | 8 | 15 | −7 | 7 | |

Updated to match(es) played on June 15, 1996. Source: RSSSF.com
Rules for classification: 1) points; 2) wins; 3) goal difference; 4) number of goals scored.

==== Group 2 ====
| Pos | Team | Pld | W | D | L | GF | GA | GD | Pts | Qualification or relegation |
|---|---|---|---|---|---|---|---|---|---|---|
| 1 | Grêmio | 6 | 3 | 2 | 1 | 9 | 4 | +5 | 11 | Qualified |
| 2 | Santo Ângelo | 6 | 3 | 1 | 2 | 6 | 7 | −1 | 10 | |
| 3 | Caxias | 6 | 2 | 3 | 1 | 7 | 5 | +2 | 9 | |
| 4 | Glória | 6 | 0 | 2 | 4 | 3 | 9 | −6 | 2 | |

Updated to match(es) played on June 15, 1996. Source: RSSSF.com
Rules for classification: 1) points; 2) wins; 3) goal difference; 4) number of goals scored.

=== Finals ===
| Team 1 | Agg. | Team 2 | 1st leg | 2nd leg |
|---|---|---|---|---|
| Juventude | 0–7 | Grêmio | 0–3 | 0–4 |

23 June 1996
Finals

| Juventude | 0 – 3 | Grêmio |
|---|---|---|
| | | Goiano 38'; Jardel 58', 81' |

Alfredo Jaconi, Caxias do Sul
Attendance: 27,446
Referee: Carlos Eugênio Simon
30 June 1996
Finals

| Grêmio | 4 – 0 | Juventude |
|---|---|---|
| Aílton 23'; Jardel 47', 52', 73' |

Olímpico, Porto Alegre
Attendance: 41,913
Referee: Alexandre Lourenço Barreto

== Copa Daltro Menezes ==
For the second semester, a state cup was held; the Copa Daltro Menezes. The ten teams played each other in a double round-robin system, with the two best teams qualifying automatically for the Second phase of the 1997 championship.

| Pos | Team | Pld | W | D | L | GF | GA | GD | Pts | Qualification or relegation |
|---|---|---|---|---|---|---|---|---|---|---|
| 1 | Caxias | 18 | 12 | 4 | 2 | 34 | 9 | +25 | 40 | Champions and Qualified to 1997 Second phase |
| 2 | Brasil de Pelotas | 18 | 12 | 2 | 4 | 29 | 14 | +15 | 38 | Qualified to 1997 Second phase |
| 3 | Veranópolis | 18 | 9 | 8 | 1 | 27 | 9 | +18 | 35 | |
| 4 | Santo Ângelo | 18 | 8 | 5 | 5 | 26 | 21 | +5 | 29 | |
| 5 | São Luiz | 18 | 6 | 6 | 6 | 18 | 20 | −2 | 24 | |
| 6 | Pelotas | 18 | 6 | 3 | 9 | 17 | 22 | −5 | 21 | |
| 7 | Taquariense | 18 | 5 | 6 | 7 | 17 | 21 | −4 | 21 | |
| 8 | São Paulo | 18 | 5 | 4 | 9 | 12 | 33 | −21 | 19 | |
| 9 | Guarany de Garibaldi | 18 | 3 | 6 | 9 | 12 | 24 | −12 | 15 | |
| 10 | Esportivo | 18 | 1 | 2 | 15 | 8 | 27 | −19 | 5 | |

Updated to match(es) played on November 10, 1996. Source: RSSSF.com
Rules for classification: 1) points; 2) wins; 3) goal difference; 4) number of goals scored.
