= 1975 Campeonato Gaúcho =

Campeonato Gaúcho
- Season: 1975
- Champions: Internacional
- 1975 Copa Brasil: Grêmio; Internacional
- Matches: 325
- Goals: 671 (2.06 per match)
- Top goalscorer: Tarciso (Grêmio); Bebeto (Gaúcho) – 13 goals
- Biggest home win: Internacional 6–0 Ypiranga (April 27, 1975)
- Biggest away win: Novo Hamburgo 0-4 Grêmio (May 21, 1975)
- Highest scoring: Gaúcho 6-1 Tupi (March 30, 1975); Pelotas 4–3 Rio-Grandense (April 6, 1975)

The 55th season of the Campeonato Gaúcho kicked off on February 16, 1975, and ended on August 10, 1975. Thirty-two teams participated. Internacional won their 23rd title.

== Participating teams ==
| Club | Stadium | Home location | Previous season |
|---|---|---|---|
| Aimoré | Cristo-Rei | São Leopoldo | 12th (Copa Governador) |
| Alegrete | Municipal Farroupilha | Alegrete | 15th (Copa Governador) |
| Associação Caxias | Baixada Rubra | Caxias do Sul | 3rd |
| Atlântico | Baixada Rubra | Erechim | 6th (Copa Governador) |
| Atlético de Carazinho | Paulo Coutinho | Carazinho | 4th |
| Cachoeira | Joaquim Vidal | Cachoeira do Sul | 2nd (Copa Governador) |
| Esportivo | Montanha | Bento Gonçalves | 6th |
| Elite | João Augusto Rodrigues | Santo Ângelo | 11th (Copa Governador) |
| Farroupilha | Nicolau Fico | Pelotas | 18th (Copa Governador) |
| Encantado | Cabriúvas | Encantado | 10th |
| Gaúcho | Wolmar Salton | Passo Fundo | 8th |
| Grêmio | Pedra Moura | Bagé | 1st (Copa Governador) |
| Grêmio | Olímpico | Porto Alegre | 2nd |
| Grêmio | Honório Nunes | Santana do Livramento | – |
| Guarany | Estrela D'Alva | Bagé | 10th (Copa Governador) |
| Guarany | Alcides Santarosa | Garibaldi | – |
| Internacional | Beira-Rio | Porto Alegre | 1st |
| Internacional | General Vargas | São Borja | – |
| Internacional | Presidente Vargas | Santa Maria | 5th |
| Juventude | Ernesto Dornelles | Guaporé | 9th (Copa Governador) |
| Lajeado | Florestal | Lajeado | 14th (Copa Governador) |
| Novo Hamburgo | Santa Rosa | Novo Hamburgo | 11th |
| Pelotas | Boca do Lobo | Pelotas | 5th (Copa Governador) |
| Rio Grande | Oliveiras | Rio Grande | – |
| Rio-Grandense | Torquato Pontes | Rio Grande | 13th |
| São José | Passo d'Areia | Porto Alegre | 16th |
| São Paulo | Aldo Dapuzzo | Rio Grande | – |
| São Luiz | 19 de Outubro | Ijuí | 12th |
| Santa Cruz | Plátanos | Santa Cruz do Sul | 7th |
| Santo Ângelo | Zona Norte | Santo Ângelo | 3rd (Copa Governador) |
| Tupi | Eucaliptos | Crissiumal | – |
| Ypiranga | Colosso da Lagoa | Erechim | 9th |

== System ==
The championship would have four stages.:

- Preliminary phase: The ten clubs that had participated in the Final decagonal of last year's championship (minus Grêmio and Internacional) would join the sixteen teams qualified in the Copa Governador do Estado of the previous year and another six teams qualified from the Copa Cícero Soares. the resulting thirty teams would be divided into six groups of five teams. Each team would play against the teams of their own group twice and the three best teams of each group would qualify to the First stage.
- First phase: The remaining eighteen teams, now joined by Grêmio and Internacional, would play each other once. The four best teams would qualify to the Second round. The winner would also qualify for the Final phase.
- Second phase: The remaining four teams would play each other twice. the best team in each round qualified to the Final phase.
- Finals: The winners of the first stage and the two rounds of the second stage qualified to this stage. Each participant would have one point allotted to them by stage won, and the teams would play each other until one reached four points, with that team winning the title. If the same team won all three stages, it would win the title automatically.

== Championship ==
=== Preliminary phase ===
==== Group 1 ====
| Pos | Team | Pld | W | D | L | GF | GA | GD | Pts | Qualification or relegation |
|---|---|---|---|---|---|---|---|---|---|---|
| 1 | Associação Caxias | 8 | 4 | 2 | 2 | 7 | 5 | +2 | 10 | Qualified to First phase |
| 2 | Cachoeira | 8 | 4 | 2 | 2 | 8 | 8 | 0 | 10 | Qualified to First phase |
| 3 | Lajeado | 8 | 3 | 3 | 2 | 8 | 6 | +2 | 9 | Qualified to First phase |
| 4 | Esportivo | 8 | 1 | 5 | 2 | 7 | 5 | +2 | 7 | |
| 5 | Guarany de Garibaldi | 8 | 0 | 4 | 4 | 3 | 9 | −6 | 4 | |

Updated to match(es) played on April 20, 1975. Source: RSSSF.com
Rules for classification: 1) points; 2) wins; 3) goal difference; 4) number of goals scored.

==== Group 2 ====
| Pos | Team | Pld | W | D | L | GF | GA | GD | Pts | Qualification or relegation |
|---|---|---|---|---|---|---|---|---|---|---|
| 1 | Ypiranga de Erechim | 8 | 4 | 3 | 1 | 8 | 3 | +5 | 11 | Qualified to First phase |
| 2 | Atlético de Carazinho | 8 | 4 | 3 | 1 | 10 | 6 | +4 | 11 | Qualified to First phase |
| 3 | São Luiz | 8 | 4 | 2 | 2 | 9 | 7 | +2 | 10 | Qualified to First phase |
| 4 | Atlântico | 8 | 1 | 3 | 4 | 4 | 9 | −5 | 5 | |
| 5 | Juventude de Guaporé | 8 | 0 | 3 | 5 | 5 | 11 | −6 | 3 | |

Updated to match(es) played on April 20, 1975. Source: RSSSF.com
Rules for classification: 1) points; 2) wins; 3) goal difference; 4) number of goals scored.

==== Group 3 ====
| Pos | Team | Pld | W | D | L | GF | GA | GD | Pts | Qualification or relegation |
|---|---|---|---|---|---|---|---|---|---|---|
| 1 | Internacional de Santa Maria | 8 | 6 | 1 | 1 | 12 | 5 | +7 | 13 | Qualified to First phase |
| 2 | Gaúcho | 8 | 4 | 3 | 1 | 17 | 10 | +7 | 11 | Qualified to First phase |
| 3 | Santo Ângelo | 8 | 1 | 4 | 3 | 6 | 9 | −3 | 6 | Qualified to First phase |
| 4 | Elite | 8 | 2 | 1 | 5 | 8 | 11 | −3 | 5 | |
| 5 | Tupi | 8 | 1 | 3 | 4 | 7 | 15 | −8 | 5 | |

Updated to match(es) played on April 20, 1975. Source: RSSSF.com
Rules for classification: 1) points; 2) wins; 3) goal difference; 4) number of goals scored.

==== Group 4 ====
| Pos | Team | Pld | W | D | L | GF | GA | GD | Pts | Qualification or relegation |
|---|---|---|---|---|---|---|---|---|---|---|
| 1 | Santa Cruz | 8 | 4 | 4 | 0 | 14 | 8 | +6 | 12 | Qualified to First phase |
| 2 | São José | 8 | 4 | 2 | 2 | 7 | 6 | +1 | 10 | Qualified to First phase |
| 3 | Novo Hamburgo | 8 | 2 | 3 | 3 | 7 | 8 | −1 | 7 | Qualified to First phase |
| 4 | Aimoré | 8 | 2 | 2 | 4 | 6 | 10 | −4 | 6 | |
| 5 | Encantado | 8 | 1 | 3 | 4 | 5 | 7 | −2 | 5 | |

Updated to match(es) played on April 20, 1975. Source: RSSSF.com
Rules for classification: 1) points; 2) wins; 3) goal difference; 4) number of goals scored.

==== Group 5 ====
| Pos | Team | Pld | W | D | L | GF | GA | GD | Pts | Qualification or relegation |
|---|---|---|---|---|---|---|---|---|---|---|
| 1 | Rio Grande | 8 | 5 | 2 | 1 | 9 | 6 | +3 | 12 | Qualified to First phase Finals |
| 2 | Rio-Grandense | 8 | 3 | 3 | 2 | 11 | 9 | +2 | 9 | Qualified to First phase Finals |
| 3 | São Paulo | 8 | 2 | 4 | 2 | 7 | 5 | +2 | 8 | Qualified to First phase Finals |
| 4 | Pelotas | 8 | 2 | 2 | 4 | 8 | 12 | −4 | 6 | |
| 5 | Farroupilha | 8 | 1 | 3 | 4 | 7 | 10 | −3 | 5 | |

Updated to match(es) played on April 20, 1975. Source: RSSSF.com
Rules for classification: 1) points; 2) wins; 3) goal difference; 4) number of goals scored.

==== Group 6 ====
| Pos | Team | Pld | W | D | L | GF | GA | GD | Pts | Qualification or relegation |
|---|---|---|---|---|---|---|---|---|---|---|
| 1 | Guarany de Bagé | 8 | 5 | 1 | 2 | 10 | 3 | +7 | 11 | Qualified to First phase Finals |
| 2 | Grêmio Bagé | 8 | 4 | 3 | 1 | 6 | 3 | +3 | 11 | Qualified to First phase Finals |
| 3 | Inter de São Borja | 8 | 2 | 2 | 4 | 5 | 8 | −3 | 6 | Qualified to First phase Finals |
| 4 | Alegrete | 8 | 2 | 2 | 4 | 7 | 8 | −1 | 6 | |
| 5 | Grêmio Santanense | 8 | 2 | 2 | 4 | 5 | 11 | −6 | 6 | |

Updated to match(es) played on April 20, 1975. Source: RSSSF.com
Rules for classification: 1) points; 2) wins; 3) direct record; 4) goal difference; 5) number of goals scored.

=== First phase ===
| Pos | Team | Pld | W | D | L | GF | GA | GD | Pts | Qualification or relegation |
|---|---|---|---|---|---|---|---|---|---|---|
| 1 | Internacional | 19 | 16 | 3 | 0 | 50 | 6 | +44 | 35 | Qualified to Finals |
| 2 | Grêmio | 19 | 15 | 3 | 1 | 45 | 11 | +34 | 33 | Qualified to Second phase |
| 3 | Associação Caxias | 19 | 10 | 6 | 3 | 22 | 10 | +12 | 26 | Qualified to Second phase |
| 4 | Santa Cruz | 19 | 7 | 8 | 4 | 21 | 14 | +7 | 22 | Qualified to Second phase |
| 5 | São Luiz | 19 | 8 | 5 | 6 | 23 | 20 | +3 | 21 | |
| 6 | Internacional de Santa Maria | 19 | 7 | 7 | 5 | 18 | 14 | +4 | 21 | |
| 7 | Gaúcho | 19 | 8 | 4 | 7 | 21 | 25 | −4 | 20 | |
| 8 | Grêmio Bagé | 19 | 7 | 6 | 6 | 15 | 13 | +2 | 20 | |
| 9 | Atlético de Carazinho | 19 | 7 | 6 | 6 | 16 | 15 | +1 | 20 | |
| 10 | Santo Ângelo | 19 | 7 | 5 | 7 | 22 | 21 | +1 | 19 | |
| 11 | Ypiranga de Erechim | 19 | 6 | 7 | 6 | 16 | 20 | −4 | 19 | |
| 12 | Rio-Grandense | 19 | 6 | 6 | 7 | 13 | 19 | −6 | 18 | |
| 13 | Lajeado | 19 | 6 | 5 | 8 | 19 | 19 | 0 | 17 | |
| 14 | Guarany de Bagé | 19 | 5 | 7 | 7 | 17 | 17 | 0 | 17 | |
| 15 | São José | 19 | 6 | 4 | 9 | 17 | 17 | 0 | 16 | |
| 16 | Inter de São Borja | 19 | 4 | 8 | 7 | 13 | 18 | −5 | 16 | |
| 17 | Cachoeira | 19 | 6 | 3 | 10 | 18 | 31 | −13 | 15 | |
| 18 | Rio Grande | 19 | 3 | 3 | 13 | 13 | 37 | −24 | 9 | |
| 19 | São Paulo | 19 | 2 | 4 | 13 | 14 | 35 | −21 | 8 | |
| 20 | Novo Hamburgo | 19 | 1 | 6 | 12 | 11 | 42 | −31 | 8 | |

Updated to match(es) played on July 13, 1975. Source: RSSSF.com
Rules for classification: 1) points; 2) wins; 3) goal difference; 4) number of goals scored.

=== Second phase ===
==== First round ====
| Pos | Team | Pld | W | D | L | GF | GA | GD | Pts | Qualification or relegation |
|---|---|---|---|---|---|---|---|---|---|---|
| 1 | Associação Caxias | 3 | 2 | 0 | 1 | 3 | 2 | +1 | 4 | Qualified to Playoffs |
| 2 | Internacional | 3 | 2 | 0 | 1 | 4 | 3 | +1 | 4 | Qualified to Playoffs |
| 3 | Grêmio | 3 | 2 | 0 | 1 | 5 | 4 | +1 | 4 | |
| 4 | Santa Cruz | 3 | 0 | 0 | 3 | 1 | 4 | −3 | 0 | |

Updated to match(es) played on July 23, 1975. Source: RSSSF.com
Rules for classification: 1) points; 2) wins; 3) goal average; 4) number of goals scored.

===== Playoffs =====
27 July 1975

| Associação Caxias | 0 – 1 | Internacional |

Caxias do Sul

==== Second round ====
| Pos | Team | Pld | W | D | L | GF | GA | GD | Pts | Qualification or relegation |
|---|---|---|---|---|---|---|---|---|---|---|
| 1 | Internacional | 3 | 1 | 2 | 0 | 6 | 3 | +3 | 4 | Qualified to Playoffs |
| 2 | Grêmio | 3 | 1 | 2 | 0 | 3 | 1 | +2 | 4 | Qualified to Playoffs |
| 3 | Santa Cruz | 3 | 1 | 1 | 1 | 1 | 3 | −2 | 3 | |
| 4 | Associação Caxias | 3 | 0 | 1 | 2 | 2 | 5 | −3 | 1 | |

Updated to match(es) played on August 6, 1975. Source: RSSSF.com
Rules for classification: 1) points; 2) wins; 3) goal difference; 4) number of goals scored.

===== Playoffs =====
10 August 1975
Finals

| Internacional | 1 – 0 (a.e.t.) | Grêmio |
|---|---|---|
| Flávio Minuano 104' |

Beira-Rio, Porto Alegre
Referee: Agomar Martins Röhrig

== Copa Governador do Estado ==
=== System ===
The cup would have seven stages:

- First phase: Sixteen teams would be divided into four groups of four teams. Each team would play twice against the teams of its own group. All teams qualified to the Second phase.
- Second phase: The sixteen teams joined the twelve teams that had been eliminated in the Preliminary phase of the Campeonato Gaúcho and were divided into four groups of seven teams. Once again, all teams qualified to the Third phase.
- Third phase: The twenty-eight teams joined the sixteen teams that had been eliminated in the First phase of the Campeonato Gaúcho and another ten teams. the resulting fifty-four were divided into ten groups of five or six teams. The three best teams of each group would qualify to the 1976 Campeonato Gaúcho. The best teams of each group qualified to the Fourth phase.
- Fourth phase: The remaining ten teams would play each other in a double-legged knockout tie. One of the winners would be sorted to qualify directly to the Semifinals.
- Fifth phase: The remaining four teams would play each other in a double-legged knockout tie. One of the winners would be sorted to qualify directly to the Finals.
- Semifinals: The winners of the fifth phase would play the team that had received a bye to the semifinals in a double-legged knockout tie. The winner qualified to the Finals.
- Finals: The winners of the Semifinals would play the team that had received a bye to the Finals in a double-legged knockout tie for the title.

=== Third phase ===
==== Group A ====
| Pos | Team | Pld | W | D | L | GF | GA | GD | Pts | Qualification or relegation |
|---|---|---|---|---|---|---|---|---|---|---|
| 1 | Farroupilha | 10 | 3 | 6 | 1 | 13 | 9 | +4 | 12 | Qualified to 1976 Campeonato Gaúcho; Fourth phase |
| 2 | Pelotas | 10 | 3 | 5 | 2 | 8 | 4 | +4 | 11 | Qualified to 1976 Campeonato Gaúcho |
| 3 | Rio-Grandense | 10 | 4 | 3 | 3 | 14 | 12 | +2 | 11 | Qualified to 1976 Campeonato Gaúcho |
| 4 | São Paulo | 10 | 3 | 3 | 4 | 6 | 11 | −5 | 9 | |
| 5 | Rio Grande | 10 | 2 | 5 | 3 | 10 | 11 | −1 | 9 | |
| 6 | Brasil de Pelotas | 10 | 0 | 8 | 2 | 5 | 8 | −3 | 8 | |

Updated to match(es) played on October 28, 1975. Source: RSSSF.com
Rules for classification: 1) points; 2) wins; 3) goal difference; 4) number of goals scored.

==== Group B ====
| Pos | Team | Pld | W | D | L | GF | GA | GD | Pts | Qualification or relegation |
|---|---|---|---|---|---|---|---|---|---|---|
| 1 | Grêmio Bagé | 10 | 6 | 3 | 1 | 12 | 3 | +9 | 15 | Qualified to 1976 Campeonato Gaúcho; Fourth phase |
| 2 | Guarany de Bagé | 10 | 6 | 3 | 1 | 18 | 3 | +15 | 15 | Qualified to 1976 Campeonato Gaúcho |
| 3 | Internacional de Santa Maria | 10 | 6 | 2 | 2 | 13 | 5 | +8 | 14 | Qualified to 1976 Campeonato Gaúcho |
| 4 | São Gabriel | 10 | 2 | 3 | 5 | 4 | 7 | −3 | 7 | |
| 5 | Riograndense | 10 | 3 | 0 | 7 | 7 | 11 | −4 | 6 | |
| 6 | Oriente de São Gabriel | 10 | 1 | 1 | 8 | 5 | 30 | −25 | 3 | |

Updated to match(es) played on October 28, 1975. Source: RSSSF.com
Rules for classification: 1) points; 2) wins; 3) goal difference; 4) number of goals scored.

==== Group C ====
| Pos | Team | Pld | W | D | L | GF | GA | GD | Pts | Qualification or relegation |
|---|---|---|---|---|---|---|---|---|---|---|
| 1 | Sá Viana | 8 | 5 | 3 | 0 | 11 | 3 | +8 | 13 | Qualified to 1976 Campeonato Gaúcho; Fourth phase |
| 2 | Ferro Carril | 8 | 3 | 3 | 2 | 7 | 3 | +4 | 9 | Qualified to 1976 Campeonato Gaúcho |
| 3 | Armour | 8 | 3 | 3 | 2 | 12 | 11 | +1 | 9 | Qualified to 1976 Campeonato Gaúcho |
| 4 | 14 de Julho | 8 | 1 | 4 | 3 | 8 | 10 | −2 | 6 | |
| 5 | Grêmio Santanense | 8 | 0 | 3 | 5 | 5 | 16 | −11 | 3 | |

Updated to match(es) played on October 28, 1975. Source: RSSSF.com
Rules for classification: 1) points; 2) wins; 3) goal difference; 4) number of goals scored.

==== Group D ====
| Pos | Team | Pld | W | D | L | GF | GA | GD | Pts | Qualification or relegation |
|---|---|---|---|---|---|---|---|---|---|---|
| 1 | Caxias | 10 | 8 | 2 | 0 | 30 | 1 | +29 | 18 | Qualified to 1976 Campeonato Gaúcho;Fourth phase |
| 2 | São José | 10 | 7 | 1 | 2 | 14 | 4 | +10 | 15 | Qualified to 1976 Campeonato Gaúcho |
| 3 | Aimoré | 10 | 4 | 4 | 2 | 9 | 5 | +4 | 12 | Qualified to 1976 Campeonato Gaúcho |
| 4 | Novo Hamburgo | 10 | 4 | 1 | 5 | 5 | 6 | −1 | 9 | |
| 5 | Igrejinha | 10 | 0 | 3 | 7 | 2 | 16 | −14 | 3 | |
| 6 | Mundo Novo | 10 | 0 | 3 | 7 | 2 | 30 | −28 | 3 | |

Updated to match(es) played on October 28, 1975. Source: RSSSF.com
Rules for classification: 1) points; 2) wins; 3) goal difference; 4) number of goals scored.

==== Group E ====
| Pos | Team | Pld | W | D | L | GF | GA | GD | Pts | Qualification or relegation |
|---|---|---|---|---|---|---|---|---|---|---|
| 1 | Inter de São Borja | 8 | 4 | 3 | 1 | 12 | 5 | +7 | 11 | Qualified to 1976 Campeonato Gaúcho;Fourth phase |
| 2 | Alegrete | 8 | 4 | 2 | 2 | 12 | 10 | +2 | 10 | Qualified to 1976 Campeonato Gaúcho |
| 3 | Santa Rosa | 8 | 4 | 1 | 3 | 14 | 5 | +9 | 9 | Qualified to 1976 Campeonato Gaúcho |
| 4 | Cruzeiro de São Borja | 8 | 1 | 5 | 2 | 8 | 8 | 0 | 7 | |
| 5 | XIV de Julho de Itaqui | 8 | 1 | 1 | 6 | 7 | 22 | −15 | 3 | |

Updated to match(es) played on October 26, 1975. Source: RSSSF.com
Rules for classification: 1) points; 2) wins; 3) goal difference; 4) number of goals scored.

==== Group F ====
| Pos | Team | Pld | W | D | L | GF | GA | GD | Pts | Qualification or relegation |
|---|---|---|---|---|---|---|---|---|---|---|
| 1 | Gaúcho | 8 | 7 | 0 | 1 | 23 | 5 | +18 | 14 | Qualified to 1976 Campeonato Gaúcho;Fourth phase |
| 2 | Atlântico | 8 | 5 | 1 | 2 | 12 | 6 | +6 | 11 | Qualified to 1976 Campeonato Gaúcho |
| 3 | Ypiranga de Erechim | 8 | 5 | 0 | 3 | 12 | 8 | +4 | 10 | Qualified to 1976 Campeonato Gaúcho |
| 4 | Tabajara-Guaíba | 8 | 1 | 1 | 6 | 9 | 21 | −12 | 3 | |
| 5 | Guarany de Espumoso | 8 | 1 | 0 | 7 | 3 | 19 | −16 | 2 | |

Updated to match(es) played on October 28, 1975. Source: RSSSF.com
Rules for classification: 1) points; 2) wins; 3) goal difference; 4) number of goals scored.

==== Group G ====
| Pos | Team | Pld | W | D | L | GF | GA | GD | Pts | Qualification or relegation |
|---|---|---|---|---|---|---|---|---|---|---|
| 1 | Guarany de Garibaldi | 8 | 6 | 2 | 0 | 17 | 6 | +11 | 14 | Qualified to 1976 Campeonato Gaúcho;Fourth phase |
| 2 | Esportivo | 8 | 5 | 3 | 0 | 26 | 2 | +24 | 13 | Qualified to 1976 Campeonato Gaúcho |
| 3 | Pradense | 8 | 2 | 1 | 5 | 10 | 17 | −7 | 5 | Qualified to 1976 Campeonato Gaúcho |
| 4 | Pratense | 8 | 2 | 1 | 5 | 6 | 20 | −14 | 5 | |
| 5 | Botafogo de Fagundes Varela | 8 | 1 | 1 | 6 | 9 | 23 | −14 | 3 | |

Updated to match(es) played on October 28, 1975. Source: RSSSF.com
Rules for classification: 1) points; 2) wins; 3) goal difference; 4) number of goals scored.

==== Group H ====
| Pos | Team | Pld | W | D | L | GF | GA | GD | Pts | Qualification or relegation |
|---|---|---|---|---|---|---|---|---|---|---|
| 1 | Atlético de Carazinho | 8 | 5 | 2 | 1 | 13 | 5 | +8 | 12 | Qualified to 1976 Campeonato Gaúcho; Fourth phase |
| 2 | São Luiz | 8 | 4 | 1 | 3 | 10 | 5 | +5 | 9 | Qualified to 1976 Campeonato Gaúcho |
| 3 | Tamoio | 8 | 3 | 1 | 4 | 8 | 13 | −5 | 7 | |
| 4 | Tupi | 8 | 2 | 2 | 4 | 11 | 15 | −4 | 6 | Qualified to 1976 Campeonato Gaúcho |
| 5 | Santo Ângelo | 8 | 2 | 2 | 4 | 8 | 12 | −4 | 6 | |

Updated to match(es) played on October 28, 1975. Source: RSSSF.com
Rules for classification: 1) points; 2) wins; 3) goal difference; 4) number of goals scored.

==== Group I ====
| Pos | Team | Pld | W | D | L | GF | GA | GD | Pts | Qualification or relegation |
|---|---|---|---|---|---|---|---|---|---|---|
| 1 | Estrela | 8 | 4 | 3 | 1 | 6 | 7 | −1 | 11 | Qualified to Campeonato Gaúcho; Fourth phase |
| 2 | Santa Cruz | 8 | 4 | 3 | 1 | 9 | 3 | +6 | 11 | Qualified to 1976 Campeonato Gaúcho |
| 3 | Lajeadense | 8 | 4 | 1 | 3 | 10 | 7 | +3 | 9 | Qualified to 1976 Campeonato Gaúcho |
| 4 | Cachoeira | 8 | 1 | 5 | 2 | 5 | 7 | −2 | 7 | |
| 5 | Encantado | 8 | 0 | 2 | 6 | 2 | 8 | −6 | 2 | |

Updated to match(es) played on October 28, 1975. Source: RSSSF.com
Rules for classification: 1) points; 2) wins; 3) goal difference; 4) number of goals scored.

==== Group J ====
| Pos | Team | Pld | W | D | L | GF | GA | GD | Pts | Qualification or relegation |
|---|---|---|---|---|---|---|---|---|---|---|
| 1 | Juventude | 10 | 7 | 3 | 0 | 25 | 4 | +21 | 17 | Qualified to 1976 Campeonato Gaúcho;Fourth phase |
| 2 | Cruzeiro | 10 | 7 | 2 | 1 | 15 | 11 | +4 | 16 | Qualified to 1976 Campeonato Gaúcho |
| 3 | Juventude de Guaporé | 10 | 5 | 1 | 4 | 22 | 9 | +13 | 11 | Qualified to 1976 Campeonato Gaúcho |
| 4 | Brasil de Farroupilha | 10 | 1 | 6 | 3 | 12 | 15 | −3 | 8 | |
| 5 | Jeromina | 10 | 1 | 3 | 6 | 10 | 21 | −11 | 5 | |
| 6 | Guarani de Venâncio Aires | 10 | 0 | 3 | 7 | 5 | 29 | −24 | 3 | |

Updated to match(es) played on October 28, 1975. Source: RSSSF.com
Rules for classification: 1) points; 2) wins; 3) goal difference; 4) number of goals scored.

=== Fourth phase ===
| Team 1 | Agg. | Team 2 | 1st leg | 2nd leg |
|---|---|---|---|---|
| Estrela | 0–1 (a.e.t) | Juventude | 0–0 | 0–1 |
| Farroupilha | 2–3 (a.e.t) | Grêmio Bagé | 1–1 | 1–2 |
| Sá Viana | 1–2 (a.e.t) | Caxias | 1–0 | 0–2 |
| Inter de São Borja | 2–4 | Gaúcho | 2–2 | 0–2 |
| Guarany de Garibaldi | 2–4 | Atlético de Carazinho | 2–2 | 0–2 |

=== Fifth phase ===
| Team 1 | Agg. | Team 2 | 1st leg | 2nd leg |
|---|---|---|---|---|
| Grêmio Bagé | 1–2 | Caxias | 0–0 | 1–2 |
| Gaúcho | 2–0 | Atlético de Carazinho | 1–0 | 1–0 |
| Juventude | | bye | | |

=== Semifinals ===
| Team 1 | Agg. | Team 2 | 1st leg | 2nd leg |
|---|---|---|---|---|
| Gaúcho | 3–3 (pen. 3-4) | Juventude | 1–2 | 2–1 |
| Caxias | | bye | | |

=== Finals ===
| Team 1 | Agg. | Team 2 | 1st leg | 2nd leg |
|---|---|---|---|---|
| Juventude | 2–2 (pen. 3-2) | Caxias | 1–0 | 1–2 |
