= 1971 Campeonato Gaúcho =

Campeonato Gaúcho
- Season: 1971
- Champions: Internacional
- Matches: 353
- Goals: 817 (2.31 per match)
- Top goalscorer: Laírton (Esportivo) - 23 goals
- Biggest home win: Flamengo 7-1 Riograndense (March 21, 1971); Internacional 6-0 São Paulo (May 12, 1971); Cruzeiro 6-0 Atlântico (June 6, 1971)
- Biggest away win: Atlântico 0-4 Avenida (March 7, 1971); Rio Grande 0-4 Novo Hamburgo (June 6, 1971)
- Highest scoring: Grêmio 5-3 Aimoré (February 18, 1971); Flamengo 7-1 Riograndense (March 21, 1971)

The 51st season of the Campeonato Gaúcho kicked off on January 24, 1971, and ended on September 22, 1971. Twenty-five teams participated. Internacional won their 19th title.

== Participating teams ==
Club	Stadium	Home location	Previous season
14 de Julho	Vermelhão da Serra	Passo Fundo	8th
Aimoré	Cristo-Rei	São Leopoldo	14th
Atlântico	Baixada Rubra	Erechim	–
Avenida	Eucaliptos	Santa Cruz do Sul	3rd (Second level)
Barroso-São José	Passo d'Areia	Porto Alegre	17th
Brasil	Bento Freitas	Pelotas	12th
Cruzeiro	Beira-Rio	Porto Alegre	5th
Esportivo	Montanha	Bento Gonçalves	4th
Farroupilha	Nicolau Fico	Pelotas	18th
Flamengo	Baixada Rubra	Caxias do Sul	3rd
Gaúcho	Wolmar Salton	Passo Fundo	15th
Grêmio	Pedra Moura	Bagé	5th (Second level)
Grêmio	Olímpico	Porto Alegre	2nd
Guarany	Estrela D'Alva	Bagé	16th
Internacional	Beira-Rio	Porto Alegre	1st
Internacional	Presidente Vargas	Santa Maria	9th
Juventude	Quinta dos Pinheiros	Caxias do Sul	13th
Novo Hamburgo	Santa Rosa	Novo Hamburgo	6th
Pelotas	Boca do Lobo	Pelotas	10th
Rio Grande	Oliveiras	Rio Grande	–
Riograndense	Eucaliptos	Santa Maria	–
Santa Cruz	Plátanos	Santa Cruz do Sul	7th
São Paulo	Aldo Dapuzzo	Rio Grande	1st (Second level)
Tamoio	Zona Norte	Santo Ângelo	2nd (Second level)
Ypiranga	Colosso da Lagoa	Erechim	11th

== System ==
The championship would have two stages.:

- Preliminary phase: Twenty-five clubs would be divided into two groups - one with thirteen teams and one with twelve. each team played the teams in its group and the other group once. The four best teams in each group qualified to the octagonal.
- Octagonal: The remaining eight teams would play each other in a double round-robin format. The team with the most points won the title.

== Championship ==
=== Preliminary phase ===
==== Group A ====
Pos	Team	Pld	W	D	L	GF	GA	GD	Pts	Qualification or relegation
1	Internacional	24	15	8	1	45	10	+35	38	Qualified to Octogonal
2	Esportivo	23	16	2	5	53	24	+29	34 (Note: The match between Esportivo and São Paulo wasn't held)	Qualified to Octogonal
3	Cruzeiro	24	11	9	4	40	17	+23	31	Qualified to Octogonal
4	Gaúcho	24	11	8	5	24	11	+13	30	Qualified to Octogonal
5	Juventude	24	12	6	6	37	27	+10	30	
6	Pelotas	24	8	8	8	19	26	−7	24	
7	Riograndense	24	7	8	9	28	47	−19	22	
8	Aimoré	24	6	9	9	24	26	−2	21	
9	Grêmio Bagé	24	8	4	12	21	27	−6	20	
10	Santa Cruz	24	7	5	12	30	39	−9	19	
11	São Paulo	23	5	5	13	23	42	−19	15	
12	Farroupilha	22	3	4	15	12	37	−25	10 (Note: Farroupilha's matches against 14 de Julho and Atlântico weren't held)	
13	Atlântico	23	0	6	17	15	59	−44	6 (Note: The match between Farroupilha and Atlântico wasn't held)	

Updated to match(es) played on June 20, 1971. Source: RSSSF.com
Rules for classification: 1) points; 2) goal difference; 3) wins; 4) number of goals scored.

==== Group B ====
Pos	Team	Pld	W	D	L	GF	GA	GD	Pts	Qualification or relegation
1	Grêmio	24	16	6	2	49	16	+33	38	Qualified to Decagonal
2	Novo Hamburgo	24	12	8	4	38	16	+22	32	Qualified to Decagonal
3	Flamengo	24	13	6	5	39	20	+19	32	Qualified to Decagonal
4	Barroso-São José	24	13	5	6	36	28	+8	31	Qualified to Decagonal
5	Brasil de Pelotas	24	9	11	4	26	19	+7	29	
6	14 de Julho	23	10	5	8	26	25	+1	25 (Note: The match between 14 de Julho and Farroupilha wasn't held)	
7	Internacional de Santa Maria	24	7	8	9	27	32	−5	22	
8	Guarany de Bagé	24	6	9	9	17	21	−4	21	
9	Ypiranga de Erechim	24	7	6	11	24	25	−1	20	
10	Avenida	24	6	7	11	25	37	−12	19	
11	Tamoio	24	5	4	15	21	39	−18	14	
12	Rio Grande	24	2	7	15	16	45	−29	11	

Updated to match(es) played on June 20, 1971. Source: RSSSF.com
Rules for classification: 1) points; 2) goal difference; 3) wins; 4) number of goals scored.

=== Octagonal ===
Pos	Team	Pld	W	D	L	GF	GA	GD	Pts	Qualification or relegation
1	Internacional	14	10	3	1	22	6	+16	23	Champions
2	Grêmio	14	9	2	3	17	8	+9	20	
3	Esportivo	14	6	2	6	13	13	0	14	
4	Barroso-São José	14	6	1	7	18	16	+2	13	
5	Novo Hamburgo	14	4	5	5	9	13	−4	13	
6	Cruzeiro	14	4	4	6	9	13	−4	12	
7	Gaúcho	14	2	5	7	8	18	−10	9	
8	Flamengo	14	2	4	8	9	18	−9	8	

Updated to match(es) played on September 22, 1971. Source: RSSSF.com
Rules for classification: 1) points; 2) goal difference; 3) wins; 4) number of goals scored.
