= 1968 Campeonato Gaúcho =

Campeonato Gaúcho
- Season: 1968
- Dates: 4 February – 28 July
- Champions: Grêmio (19th title)
- Relegated: Riograndense (RG); Guarany (BA)
- Matches played: 149
- Goals scored: 456 (3.06 per match)

The 1968 Campeonato Gaúcho was the 48th season of Rio Grande do Sul's top association football league. Grêmio won their 19th title. The league expanded to eighteen teams: the twelve clubs from last season were joined by six teams from last year's Promotion Tournament. It is unknown how these six teams were chosen: Ypiranga, São Paulo, Santa Cruz and São José were among the championship's top six teams, but Cruzeiro and Flamengo were eliminated in the first stage.

== Format ==
The championship's format changed for the first time since 1961 due to its expansion, not without controversy. The league was divided in three stages, as follows:

- Preliminary stage: clubs were divided in two groups of nine teams each, playing a single round-robin against same group teams. The bottom two advanced to the relegation tournament while the top seven clubs played another single round-robin against each other maintaining their previous results.
- Relegation tournament: the four clubs faced each other in a double-robin where the bottom two were relegated.
- Octagonal: each group's top four faced each other in a double round-robin, where the best club was crowned champions.

== Teams ==
| Club | Location | Titles | Last season |
|---|---|---|---|
| Aimoré | São Leopoldo | 0 | 11th |
| Brasil | Pelotas | 1 | 6th |
| Cruzeiro | Porto Alegre | 1 | Eliminated at earlier stages (Second Division) |
| Farroupilha | Pelotas | 1 | 3rd |
| Flamengo^{A} | Caxias do Sul | 0 | Eliminated at earlier stages (Second Division) |
| Gaúcho | Passo Fundo | 0 | 5th |
| Grêmio | Porto Alegre | 18 | 1st |
| Guarany | Bagé | 2 | 4th |
| Internacional | Porto Alegre | 16 | 2nd |
| Juventude | Caxias do Sul | 0 | 7th |
| Novo Hamburgo^{B} | Novo Hamburgo | 0 | 12th |
| Pelotas | Pelotas | 1 | 9th |
| Rio Grande | Rio Grande | 1 | 10th |
| Riograndense | Rio Grande | 0 | 8th |
| Santa Cruz | Santa Cruz do Sul | 0 | 3rd (Second Division) |
| São José | Porto Alegre | 0 | 5th (Second Division) |
| São Paulo | Rio Grande | 0 | 2nd (Second Division) |
| Ypiranga | Erechim | 0 | 1st (Second Division) |

A. Caxias was known as Flamengo until 1971.
B. Novo Hamburgo changed back to its original name, being known as Floriano since 1942.

== Preliminary stage ==
=== Group A ===
| Pos | Team | Pld | W | D | L | GF | GA | GD | Pts | Qualification or relegation |
|---|---|---|---|---|---|---|---|---|---|---|
| 1 | Grêmio | 14 | 9 | 3 | 2 | 41 | 12 | +29 | 21 | Qualification to octagonal |
| 2 | Brasil | 14 | 9 | 2 | 3 | 28 | 14 | +14 | 20 | Qualification to octagonal |
| 3 | Santa Cruz | 14 | 7 | 1 | 6 | 26 | 19 | +7 | 15 | Qualification to octagonal |
| 4 | Gaúcho | 14 | 6 | 3 | 5 | 16 | 30 | −14 | 15 | Qualification to octagonal |
| 5 | Rio Grande | 14 | 4 | 5 | 5 | 27 | 28 | −1 | 13 | |
| 6 | São José | 14 | 4 | 4 | 6 | 18 | 23 | −5 | 12 | |
| 7 | Novo Hamburgo | 14 | 3 | 5 | 6 | 20 | 32 | −12 | 11 | |
| 8 | Flamengo | 8 | 2 | 1 | 5 | 11 | 17 | −6 | 5 | Qualification to relegation tournament |
| 9 | Riograndense (RG) | 8 | 1 | 0 | 7 | 6 | 18 | −12 | 2 | Qualification to relegation tournament |

=== Group B ===
| Pos | Team | Pld | W | D | L | GF | GA | GD | Pts | Qualification or relegation |
|---|---|---|---|---|---|---|---|---|---|---|
| 1 | Internacional | 14 | 8 | 4 | 2 | 19 | 8 | +11 | 20 | Qualification to octagonal |
| 2 | Juventude | 14 | 8 | 3 | 3 | 27 | 16 | +11 | 19 | Qualification to octagonal |
| 3 | Pelotas | 14 | 7 | 3 | 4 | 16 | 13 | +3 | 17 | Qualification to octagonal |
| 4 | Cruzeiro | 14 | 5 | 4 | 5 | 13 | 14 | −1 | 14 | Qualification to octagonal |
| 5 | Aimoré | 14 | 4 | 5 | 5 | 12 | 14 | −2 | 13 | |
| 6 | Ypiranga | 14 | 5 | 2 | 7 | 10 | 14 | −4 | 12 | |
| 7 | São Paulo | 14 | 3 | 3 | 8 | 13 | 20 | −7 | 9 | |
| 8 | Guarany (BA) | 8 | 2 | 1 | 5 | 8 | 13 | −5 | 5 | Qualification to relegation tournament |
| 9 | Farroupilha | 8 | 0 | 5 | 3 | 7 | 13 | −6 | 5 | Qualification to relegation tournament |

== Octagonal ==
| Pos | Team | Pld | W | D | L | GF | GA | GD | Pts |
|---|---|---|---|---|---|---|---|---|---|
| 1 | Grêmio (C) | 14 | 9 | 4 | 1 | 25 | 6 | +19 | 22 |
| 2 | Internacional | 14 | 7 | 4 | 3 | 18 | 14 | +4 | 18 |
| 3 | Cruzeiro | 14 | 7 | 1 | 6 | 19 | 18 | +1 | 15 |
| 4 | Santa Cruz | 14 | 3 | 6 | 5 | 11 | 22 | −11 | 12 |
| 5 | Juventude | 14 | 3 | 6 | 5 | 7 | 12 | −5 | 12 |
| 6 | Brasil | 14 | 4 | 4 | 6 | 13 | 15 | −2 | 12 |
| 7 | Pelotas | 14 | 3 | 5 | 6 | 19 | 18 | +1 | 11 |
| 8 | Gaúcho | 14 | 2 | 6 | 6 | 12 | 19 | −7 | 10 |

(C) Champions

== Relegation tournament ==
| Pos | Team | Pld | W | D | L | GF | GA | GD | Pts | Relegation |
|---|---|---|---|---|---|---|---|---|---|---|
| 1 | Flamengo | 6 | 3 | 2 | 1 | 8 | 4 | +4 | 8 | |
| 2 | Farroupilha | 3 | 2 | 1 | 0 | 3 | 0 | +3 | 5 | |
| 3 | Riograndense (RG) | 2 | 0 | 1 | 1 | 3 | 4 | −1 | 1 | Relegation |
| 4 | Guarany (BA) | 3 | 0 | 0 | 3 | 0 | 6 | −6 | 0 | Relegation |

The results of five games are unknown.
