= 2000 Campeonato Gaúcho =

Campeonato Gaúcho
- Season: 2000
- Champions: Caxias
- Relegated: Avenida; Inter de Santa Maria
- Copa do Brasil: Grêmio; Internacional; Juventude; Caxias
- Série C: Inter de Santa Maria
- Copa Sul-Minas: Internacional; Grêmio; Caxias
- Matches played: 142
- Goals scored: 409 (2.88 per match)
- Top goalscorer: Felipe (Passo Fundo) – 13 goals
- Biggest home win: Guarani-VA 5-1 Passo Fundo (January 25, 2000); 15 de Novembro 4-0 São Luiz (January 30, 2000); Santa Cruz 5-1 15 de Novembro (February 27, 2000); São Luiz 5-1 Avenida (February 27, 2000); Guarani-VA 4-0 São Luiz (March 12, 2000); Caxias 4-0 Passo Fundo (April 2, 2000); Juventude 4-0 Passo Fundo (April 26, 2000); Juventude 5-1 Santa Cruz (May 10, 2000)
- Biggest away win: Pelotas 0-3 Caxias (February 17, 2000); Veranópolis 2-5 Rio Grande (February 20, 2000); 15 de Novembro 0-3 Internacional (May 10, 2000)
- Highest scoring: Grêmio 4-4 Esportivo (May 10, 2000)

The 80th season of the Campeonato Gaúcho kicked off on January 23, 2000 and ended on June 18, 2000. Seventeen teams participated. Caxias beat Grêmio in the finals and won their 1st title. Avenida and Internacional de Santa Maria were relegated.

== Participating teams ==
| Club | Home location | Previous season |
|---|---|---|
| 15 de Novembro | Campo Bom | 2nd (Second level) |
| Avenida | Santa Cruz do Sul | 8th |
| Caxias | Caxias do Sul | 5th |
| Esportivo | Bento Gonçalves | 1st (Second level) |
| Grêmio | Porto Alegre | 1st |
| Guarani | Venâncio Aires | 11th |
| Internacional | Porto Alegre | 2nd |
| Internacional | Santa Maria | 9th |
| Juventude | Caxias do Sul | 4th |
| Passo Fundo | Passo Fundo | 13th |
| Pelotas | Pelotas | 14th |
| Rio Grande | Rio Grande | 4th (Second level) |
| São José | Porto Alegre | 7th |
| São Luiz | Ijuí | 12th |
| Santa Cruz | Santa Cruz do Sul | 6th |
| Santo Ângelo | Santo Ângelo | 10th |
| Veranópolis | Veranópolis | 3rd |

== System ==
The championship would have three stages:

- First phase: The thirteen teams that didn't participate in the Copa Sul-Minas were joined by Rio Grande, which had been invited in celebration of its 100th anniversary, and were divided in two groups of seven teams. the teams in each group played against each other in a double round-robin system. After 14 rounds, the two best teams in each group qualified, along with the best non-qualified team, while the team with the fewest points in each group was relegated, to dispute the Second level in the same year. Rio Grande, as a guest, would be relegated after that year regardless of placing.
- Second phase: The five remaining teams joined the teams that participated in the Copa Sul-Minas (Internacional, Grêmio and Juventude), and played against each other twice, with the winners of each half qualifying to the Finals. The three best teams qualified to the next year's Copa Sul-Minas.
- Finals: The Second phase round winners played in two matches to define the Champions.

== Championship ==
=== First phase ===
==== Group 1 ====
| Pos | Team | Pld | W | D | L | GF | GA | GD | Pts | Qualification or relegation |
|---|---|---|---|---|---|---|---|---|---|---|
| 1 | Esportivo | 12 | 7 | 5 | 0 | 18 | 7 | +11 | 26 | Qualified |
| 2 | Caxias | 12 | 5 | 3 | 4 | 19 | 15 | +4 | 18 | Qualified |
| 3 | São José de Porto Alegre | 12 | 4 | 6 | 2 | 15 | 11 | +4 | 18 | |
| 4 | Veranópolis | 12 | 4 | 5 | 3 | 19 | 21 | −2 | 17 | |
| 5 | Rio Grande (G) | 12 | 3 | 3 | 6 | 15 | 19 | −4 | 12 | |
| 6 | Pelotas | 12 | 2 | 4 | 6 | 10 | 15 | −5 | 10 | |
| 7 | Internacional de Santa Maria | 12 | 1 | 6 | 5 | 6 | 14 | −8 | 9 | Relegated |

Updated to match(es) played on March 26, 2000. Source: RSSSF.com
Rules for classification: 1) points; 2) wins; 3) goal difference; 4) number of goals scored.
(G) Guests

==== Group 2 ====
| Pos | Team | Pld | W | D | L | GF | GA | GD | Pts | Qualification or relegation |
|---|---|---|---|---|---|---|---|---|---|---|
| 1 | 15 de Novembro | 12 | 7 | 1 | 4 | 24 | 19 | +5 | 22 | Qualified |
| 2 | Passo Fundo | 12 | 6 | 4 | 2 | 21 | 21 | 0 | 22 | Qualified |
| 3 | Santa Cruz | 12 | 6 | 3 | 3 | 21 | 16 | +5 | 21 | Qualified |
| 4 | Guarani de Venâncio Aires | 12 | 6 | 2 | 4 | 27 | 18 | +9 | 20 | |
| 5 | Santo Ângelo | 12 | 5 | 3 | 4 | 23 | 19 | +4 | 18 | |
| 6 | São Luiz | 12 | 2 | 3 | 7 | 16 | 30 | −14 | 9 | |
| 7 | Avenida | 12 | 1 | 2 | 9 | 14 | 24 | −10 | 5 | Relegated |

Updated to match(es) played on March 26, 2000. Source: RSSSF.com
Rules for classification: 1) points; 2) wins; 3) goal difference; 4) number of goals scored.

=== First round ===
| Pos | Team | Pld | W | D | L | GF | GA | GD | Pts | Qualification or relegation |
|---|---|---|---|---|---|---|---|---|---|---|
| 1 | Caxias | 7 | 5 | 1 | 1 | 13 | 6 | +7 | 16 | Qualified to Finals |
| 2 | Juventude | 7 | 3 | 3 | 1 | 13 | 8 | +5 | 12 | |
| 3 | Internacional | 7 | 3 | 3 | 1 | 14 | 10 | +4 | 12 | |
| 4 | Grêmio | 7 | 3 | 3 | 1 | 10 | 6 | +4 | 12 | |
| 5 | 15 de Novembro | 7 | 2 | 3 | 2 | 8 | 8 | 0 | 9 | |
| 6 | Santa Cruz | 7 | 2 | 1 | 4 | 9 | 11 | −2 | 7 | |
| 7 | Esportivo | 7 | 1 | 2 | 4 | 6 | 9 | −3 | 5 | |
| 8 | Passo Fundo | 7 | 0 | 2 | 5 | 5 | 20 | −15 | 2 | |

Updated to match(es) played on May 7, 2000. Source: RSSSF.com
Rules for classification: 1) points; 2) wins; 3) goal difference; 4) number of goals scored.

=== Second round ===
| Pos | Team | Pld | W | D | L | GF | GA | GD | Pts | Qualification or relegation |
|---|---|---|---|---|---|---|---|---|---|---|
| 1 | Grêmio | 7 | 6 | 1 | 0 | 15 | 6 | +9 | 19 | Qualified to Finals |
| 2 | Internacional | 7 | 6 | 0 | 1 | 16 | 4 | +12 | 18 | |
| 3 | Juventude | 7 | 3 | 1 | 3 | 12 | 11 | +1 | 10 | |
| 4 | 15 de Novembro | 7 | 2 | 3 | 2 | 7 | 8 | −1 | 9 | |
| 5 | Caxias | 7 | 2 | 2 | 3 | 7 | 7 | 0 | 8 | |
| 6 | Passo Fundo | 7 | 2 | 1 | 4 | 8 | 12 | −4 | 7 | |
| 7 | Esportivo | 7 | 1 | 2 | 4 | 8 | 15 | −7 | 5 | |
| 8 | Santa Cruz | 7 | 0 | 2 | 5 | 7 | 16 | −9 | 2 | |

Updated to match(es) played on June 11, 2000. Source: RSSSF.com
Rules for classification: 1) points; 2) wins; 3) goal difference; 4) number of goals scored.

=== Final standings ===
| Pos | Team | Pld | W | D | L | GF | GA | GD | Pts | Qualification or relegation |
|---|---|---|---|---|---|---|---|---|---|---|
| 1 | Grêmio | 14 | 9 | 4 | 1 | 25 | 12 | +13 | 31 | Qualified to Copa Sul-Minas |
| 2 | Internacional | 14 | 9 | 3 | 2 | 30 | 14 | +16 | 30 | Qualified to Copa Sul-Minas |
| 3 | Caxias | 14 | 7 | 3 | 4 | 20 | 13 | +7 | 24 | Qualified to Copa Sul-Minas |
| 4 | Juventude | 14 | 6 | 4 | 4 | 25 | 19 | +6 | 22 | |
| 5 | 15 de Novembro | 14 | 4 | 6 | 4 | 15 | 16 | −1 | 18 | |
| 6 | Esportivo | 14 | 2 | 4 | 8 | 14 | 24 | −10 | 10 | |
| 7 | Santa Cruz | 14 | 2 | 3 | 9 | 16 | 27 | −11 | 9 | |
| 8 | Passo Fundo | 14 | 2 | 3 | 9 | 13 | 32 | −19 | 9 | |

Updated to match(es) played on June 11, 2000. Source: RSSSF.com
Rules for classification: 1) points; 2) wins; 3) goal difference; 4) number of goals scored.

=== Finals ===
| Team 1 | Agg. | Team 2 | 1st leg | 2nd leg |
|---|---|---|---|---|
| Caxias | 3–0 | Grêmio | 3–0 | 0–0 |

14 June 2000
Finals

| Caxias | 3 – 0 | Grêmio |
|---|---|---|
| Gil Baiano 44'; Alex Xavier 48', o.g.' Márcio 67' |

Centenário, Caxias do Sul
Attendance: 13,369
Referee: Carlos Eugênio Simon
18 June 2000
Finals

| Grêmio | 0 – 0 | Caxias |

Olímpico, Porto Alegre
Attendance: 24,326
Referee: Carlos Eugênio Simon
