= 1984 Campeonato Gaúcho =

Campeonato Gaúcho
- Season: 1984
- Champions: Internacional
- Relegated: Grêmio Bagé; São Paulo
- Taça de Ouro: Brasil de Pelotas; Grêmio; Internacional
- Taça de Prata: Novo Hamburgo
- Matches played: 344
- Goals scored: 601 (1.75 per match)
- Top goalscorer: Ademir Alcântara (Pelotas) – 21 goals
- Biggest home win: Internacional 4-0 Caxias (November 4, 1984); Grêmio 4-0 Novo Hamburgo (November 11, 1984); Internacional 4-0 Pelotas (November 14, 1984)
- Biggest away win: São Paulo 0-4 Grêmio (September 16, 1984)
- Highest scoring: São Paulo 3-3 Santa Cruz (May 27, 1984)

The 64th season of the Campeonato Gaúcho kicked off on April 22, 1984 and ended in December 13, 1984. Fourteen teams participated. Internacional won their 29th title. Grêmio Bagé and São Paulo were relegated.

== Participating teams ==
Club	Stadium	Home location	Previous season
Aimoré	Cristo-Rei	São Leopoldo	12th
Brasil	Bento Freitas	Pelotas	2nd
Caxias	Centenário	Caxias do Sul	10th
Esportivo	Montanha	Bento Gonçalves	6th
Grêmio	Pedra Moura	Bagé	11th
Grêmio	Olímpico	Porto Alegre	3rd
Internacional	Beira-Rio	Porto Alegre	1st
Internacional	Presidente Vargas	Santa Maria	9th
Juventude	Alfredo Jaconi	Caxias do Sul	4th
Novo Hamburgo	Santa Rosa	Novo Hamburgo	5th
Pelotas	Boca do Lobo	Pelotas	1st (Second level)
São Borja	Vicente Goulart	São Borja	8th
São Paulo	Aldo Dapuzzo	Rio Grande	7th
Santa Cruz	Plátanos	Santa Cruz do Sul	2nd (Second level)

== System ==
The championship would have three stages.:

- Copa ACEG: All the teams in the championship except Grêmio and Internacional played each other in a double round-robin system. The team with the most points won a direct berth and one bonus point to the Final phase.
- First phase: The fourteen clubs played each other in a double round-robin system. The winners of each round qualified to the Final phase and earned one bonus point. The other remaining berths in the Final phase were filled by the teams with the best season record, with the two best teams from the hinterland earning one bonus point to it as well. The two teams with the fewest points were relegated.
- Final phase: The six remaining teams played each other in a double round-robin system; the team with the most points won the title.

== Championship ==
=== Copa ACEG ===
Pos	Team	Pld	W	D	L	GF	GA	GD	Pts	Qualification or relegation
1	Novo Hamburgo	22	13	4	5	25	11	+14	30	Qualified to Final phase; One bonus point
2	Brasil de Pelotas	22	9	11	2	23	12	+11	29	
3	Internacional de Santa Maria	22	9	8	5	24	16	+8	26	
4	Pelotas	22	7	10	5	18	14	+4	24	
5	Caxias	22	8	7	7	17	16	+1	23	
6	Aimoré	22	8	6	8	20	23	−3	22	
7	São Borja	22	6	10	6	18	18	0	22	
8	Juventude	22	7	6	9	24	28	−4	20	
9	Esportivo	22	6	6	10	26	34	−8	18	
10	São Paulo	22	4	10	8	20	27	−7	18	
11	Santa Cruz	22	5	7	10	17	24	−7	17	
12	Grêmio Bagé	22	4	7	11	21	30	−9	15	

Updated to match(es) played on July 22, 1984. Source: RSSSF.com
Rules for classification: 1) points; 2) wins; 3) goal difference; 4) number of goals scored.

=== First phase ===
==== First round ====
Pos	Team	Pld	W	D	L	GF	GA	GD	Pts	Qualification or relegation
1	Internacional	13	7	6	0	15	5	+10	20	Qualified to Final phase;One bonus point
2	Brasil de Pelotas	13	6	5	2	14	8	+6	17	
3	Grêmio	13	5	5	3	16	10	+6	15	
4	Juventude	13	5	5	3	9	7	+2	15	
5	Aimoré	13	4	7	2	11	8	+3	15	
6	Esportivo	13	4	7	2	12	10	+2	15	
7	Internacional de Santa Maria	13	4	6	3	7	4	+3	14	
8	Caxias	13	3	6	4	9	8	+1	12	
9	Pelotas	13	2	8	3	7	7	0	12	
10	Santa Cruz	13	3	5	5	8	11	−3	11	
11	Grêmio Bagé	13	2	6	5	5	10	−5	10	
12	Novo Hamburgo	13	2	5	6	6	12	−6	9	
13	São Paulo	13	2	5	6	7	16	−9	9	
14	São Borja	13	1	6	6	5	15	−10	8	

Updated to match(es) played on September 23, 1984. Source: RSSSF.com
Rules for classification: 1) points; 2) wins; 3) goal difference; 4) number of goals scored.

==== Second round ====
Pos	Team	Pld	W	D	L	GF	GA	GD	Pts	Qualification or relegation
1	Internacional	13	9	3	1	23	4	+19	21	Qualified to Final phase; One bonus point
2	Pelotas	13	7	3	3	14	8	+6	17	
3	São Borja	13	6	5	2	11	8	+3	17	
4	Grêmio	13	5	6	2	14	7	+7	16	
5	Juventude	13	4	6	3	9	7	+2	14	
6	Internacional de Santa Maria	13	4	6	3	11	10	+1	14	
7	Novo Hamburgo	13	3	8	2	13	8	+5	14	
8	Esportivo	13	6	1	6	11	12	−1	13	
9	Aimoré	13	4	5	4	14	14	0	13	
10	Brasil de Pelotas	13	4	4	5	10	11	−1	12	
11	Santa Cruz	13	4	3	6	11	17	−6	11	
12	Caxias	13	2	5	6	11	20	−9	9	
13	São Paulo	13	2	4	7	5	14	−9	8	
14	Grêmio Bagé	13	0	3	10	5	22	−17	3	

Updated to match(es) played on November 8, 1984. Source: RSSSF.com
Rules for classification: 1) points; 2) wins; 3) goal difference; 4) number of goals scored.

==== Final standings ====
Pos	Team	Pld	W	D	L	GF	GA	GD	Pts	Qualification or relegation
1	Internacional	26	16	9	1	38	9	+29	41	Qualified as stage winners
2	Grêmio	26	10	11	5	30	17	+13	31	Qualified with the best overall record
3	Brasil de Pelotas	26	10	9	7	24	19	+5	29	Qualified with the best overall record;one bonus point
4	Pelotas	26	9	11	6	21	15	+6	29	Qualified with the best overall record;one bonus point
5	Juventude	26	9	11	6	18	14	+4	29	Qualified with the best overall record
6	Esportivo	26	10	8	8	23	22	+1	28	
7	Internacional de Santa Maria	26	8	12	6	18	14	+4	28	
8	Aimoré	26	8	12	6	25	22	+3	28	
9	São Borja	26	7	11	8	16	23	−7	25	
10	Novo Hamburgo	26	5	13	8	19	20	−1	23	Qualified as stage winners
11	Santa Cruz	26	7	8	11	19	28	−9	22	
12	Caxias	26	5	11	10	20	28	−8	21	
13	São Paulo	26	4	9	13	12	30	−18	17	Relegated
14	Grêmio Bagé	26	2	9	15	10	32	−22	13	Relegated

Updated to match(es) played on November 8, 1984. Source: RSSSF.com
Rules for classification: 1) points; 2) wins; 3) goal difference; 4) number of goals scored.

=== Final phase ===
Pos	Team	Pld	W	D	L	GF	GA	GD	Pts	Qualification or relegation
1	Internacional	10	6	1	3	17	7	+10	15	Champions;1985 Taça de Ouro
2	Grêmio	10	5	2	3	11	9	+2	12	1985 Taça de Ouro
3	Brasil de Pelotas	10	3	5	2	5	4	+1	12	1985 Taça de Ouro
4	Novo Hamburgo	10	3	4	3	10	11	−1	11	1985 Taça de Prata
5	Juventude	10	3	2	5	6	9	−3	8	
6	Pelotas	10	1	4	5	6	15	−9	7	

Updated to match(es) played on December 13, 1984. Source: RSSSF.com
Rules for classification: 1) points; 2) wins; 3) goal difference; 4) number of goals scored.
