= 1983 Campeonato Gaúcho =

Campeonato Gaúcho
- Season: 1983
- Champions: Internacional
- Taça de Ouro: Brasil de Pelotas; Grêmio; Internacional
- Taça de Prata: Novo Hamburgo; Internacional de Santa Maria
- Matches played: 193
- Goals scored: 322 (1.67 per match)
- Top goalscorer: Kita (Juventude) – 15 goals
- Biggest home win: Brasil de Pelotas 4-0 Grêmio (December 3, 1983)
- Biggest away win: Internacional de Santa Maria 0-4 Novo Hamburgo (August 28, 1983)
- Highest scoring: Caxias 4-1 Brasil de Pelotas (October 1, 1983); São Borja 4-1 Aimoré (October 2, 1983); Juventude 3-2 São Paulo (October 12, 1983); São Paulo 4-1 São Borja (October 26, 1983)

The 63rd season of the Campeonato Gaúcho kicked off on June 16, 1983, and ended on December 3, 1983. Twelve teams participated. Internacional won their 28th title. no teams were relegated.

== Participating teams ==
Club	Stadium	Home location	Previous season
Aimoré	Cristo-Rei	São Leopoldo	2nd (Second level)
Brasil	Bento Freitas	Pelotas	10th
Caxias	Centenário	Caxias do Sul	7th
Esportivo	Montanha	Bento Gonçalves	3rd
Grêmio	Pedra Moura	Bagé	1st (Second level)
Grêmio	Olímpico	Porto Alegre	2nd
Internacional	Beira-Rio	Porto Alegre	1st
Internacional	Presidente Vargas	Santa Maria	6th
Juventude	Alfredo Jaconi	Caxias do Sul	9th
Novo Hamburgo	Santa Rosa	Novo Hamburgo	4th
São Borja	Vicente Goulart	São Borja	8th
São Paulo	Aldo Dapuzzo	Rio Grande	5th

== System ==
The championship would have two stages.:

- First phase: The twelve clubs played each other in a double round-robin system. The eight best teams qualified to the Final phase, with the four best teams qualifying to a one-legged playoff to define the two teams that would receive one bonus point for the Final phase, and in addition to that, the two best teams from the hinterland earned one bonus point too.
- Final phase: The eight remaining teams played each other in a double round-robin system; the team with the most points won the title.

== Championship ==
=== First phase ===
Pos	Team	Pld	W	D	L	GF	GA	GD	Pts	Qualification or relegation
1	Internacional	22	8	11	3	20	11	+9	27	Qualified; Extra points playoffs
2	Grêmio	22	8	10	4	23	14	+9	26	Qualified; Extra points playoffs
3	São Paulo	22	8	10	4	24	15	+9	26	Qualified; Extra points playoffs
4	Esportivo	22	8	10	4	21	17	+4	26	Qualified; Extra points playoffs
5	São Borja	22	8	8	6	21	17	+4	24	Qualified
6	Novo Hamburgo	22	7	10	5	17	13	+4	24	Qualified
7	Brasil de Pelotas	22	7	9	6	15	18	−3	23	Qualified
8	Juventude	22	6	10	6	18	14	+4	22	Qualified
9	Internacional de Santa Maria	22	5	9	8	16	23	−7	19	
10	Caxias	22	4	8	10	12	17	−5	16	
11	Grêmio Bagé	22	4	8	10	11	23	−12	16	
12	Aimoré	22	3	9	10	10	24	−14	15	

Updated to match(es) played on October 4, 1983. Source: RSSSF.com
Rules for classification: 1) points; 2) wins; 3) goal difference; 4) number of goals scored.

=== Extra points playoffs ===
According to the regulations, the teams with the best performances would have the home advantage in the playoffs. However, since Grêmio and São Paulo had ended up tied in both points and goal difference, a playoff to define where the main playoff match would be played was held in neutral ground.

6 October 1983
Preliminary Playoff

São Paulo	1 – 0	Grêmio
Itamar 16'	Report

Bento Freitas, Pelotas
Referee: Carlos Sérgio Rosa Martins
9 October 1983
Playoffs

São Paulo	0 – 0 (a.e.t.)	Grêmio
	Report
Penalties
Laerte (penalty scored); Macedo (penalty scored); Neca (penalty scored); Rubens Paraná (penalty scored); Nardo (penalty missed); Paulo Barroco (penalty scored); Jorge Maravilha (penalty scored); Odir (penalty scored)	7–6	(penalty missed) Tarciso; (penalty scored) Róbson; (penalty scored) Paulo Roberto; (penalty scored) Osvaldo; (penalty scored) César; (penalty scored) Bonamigo; (penalty scored) Hugo de León; (penalty missed) Renato

Aldo Dapuzzo, Rio Grande
Attendance: 9,310
Referee: Aírton Domingos Bernardoni
9 October 1983
Playoffs

Internacional	2 – 0	Esportivo
Geraldão 19'; Rubén Paz 29'	Report

Beira-Rio, Porto Alegre
Attendance: 6,920
Referee: Luís Cunha Martins

=== Final phase ===
Pos	Team	Pld	W	D	L	GF	GA	GD	Pts	Qualification or relegation
1	Internacional	14	7	7	0	19	7	+12	22	Champions;1984 Taça de Ouro
2	Grêmio	14	6	4	4	18	11	+7	16	1984 Taça de Ouro;Second place Playoffs
3	Brasil de Pelotas	14	5	6	3	14	11	+3	16	1984 Taça de Ouro;Second place Playoffs
4	Juventude	14	6	3	5	14	17	−3	15	
5	Novo Hamburgo	14	4	5	5	10	13	−3	13	1984 Taça de Prata
6	Esportivo	14	2	8	4	11	12	−1	13	
7	São Paulo	14	2	5	7	14	21	−7	11	
8	São Borja	14	2	6	6	7	15	−8	10	

Updated to match(es) played on November 27, 1983. Source: RSSSF.com
Rules for classification: 1) points; 2) wins; 3) goal difference; 4) number of goals scored.

==== Second Place Playoffs ====
30 November 1983

Grêmio	0 – 0	Brasil de Pelotas
	Report

Olímpico, Porto Alegre
Attendance: 2,412
Referee: Roque José Gallas
3 December 1983

Brasil de Pelotas	4 – 0	Grêmio
Hélio 9'; Lívio 26', 44'; Zezinho 42'	Report

Bento Freitas, Pelotas
Attendance: 12,840
Referee: Carlos Sérgio Rosa Martins
