= Medianeira, Rio Grande do Sul =

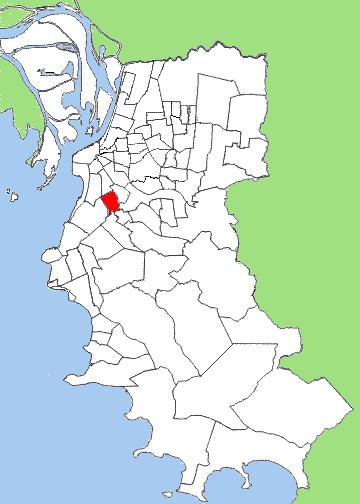
The Medianeira neighborhood of the Brazilian city of Porto Alegre.

Medianeira is a neighbourhood (bairro) in the city of Porto Alegre, the state capital of Rio Grande do Sul, in Brazil. It was created by Law 1762 from July 23, 1957, but had its limits modified by Law 4626 from December 21, 1979.

Medianeira was the first neighbourhood officially recognized by Porto Alegre City Hall, and it was named after its local parish, called Nossa Senhora Medianeira. There is located a highly regarded private school of the city, the João XXIII school.

Medianeira is home to the Estádio Olímpico Monumental, built in 1954.
