= Campeonato Gaúcho =

Football league in Brazil

Campeonato Gaúcho de Futebol
- Organising body: FGF
- Founded: 1919; 107 years ago (as Campeonato Estadual amateur); 1940; 86 years ago (as Campeonato Estadual professional)
- Country: Brazil
- State: Rio Grande do Sul
- Number of clubs: 12
- Level on pyramid: 1
- Relegation to: Série A2
- Domestic cup: Copa FGF
- Current champions: Grêmio (44th title) (2026)
- Most championships: Internacional (46 titles)
- Broadcaster(s): Rede Globo; SporTV; Premiere FC; GE.com
- Website: FGF Official website
- Current: 2026 Campeonato Gaúcho

The Campeonato Gaúcho (English: Gaúcho Championship), officially named as Campeonato Gaúcho de Futebol Série A and commonly known as the Gauchão or the Gauchão Ipiranga for sponsorship reasons, is the top-flight professional state football league in the Brazilian state of Rio Grande do Sul. It is run by the Rio Grande do Sul Football Federation (FGF).

The rivalry of two of the better-known Brazilian teams (Grêmio and Internacional) have a significant impact in the history of the tournament. Since 1940, the Grenal duo have won the title on all but four occasions: the defunct Renner was champion in 1954, Juventude almost 44 years later in 1998, Caxias, in 2000, under Tite's command, and Novo Hamburgo in 2017.

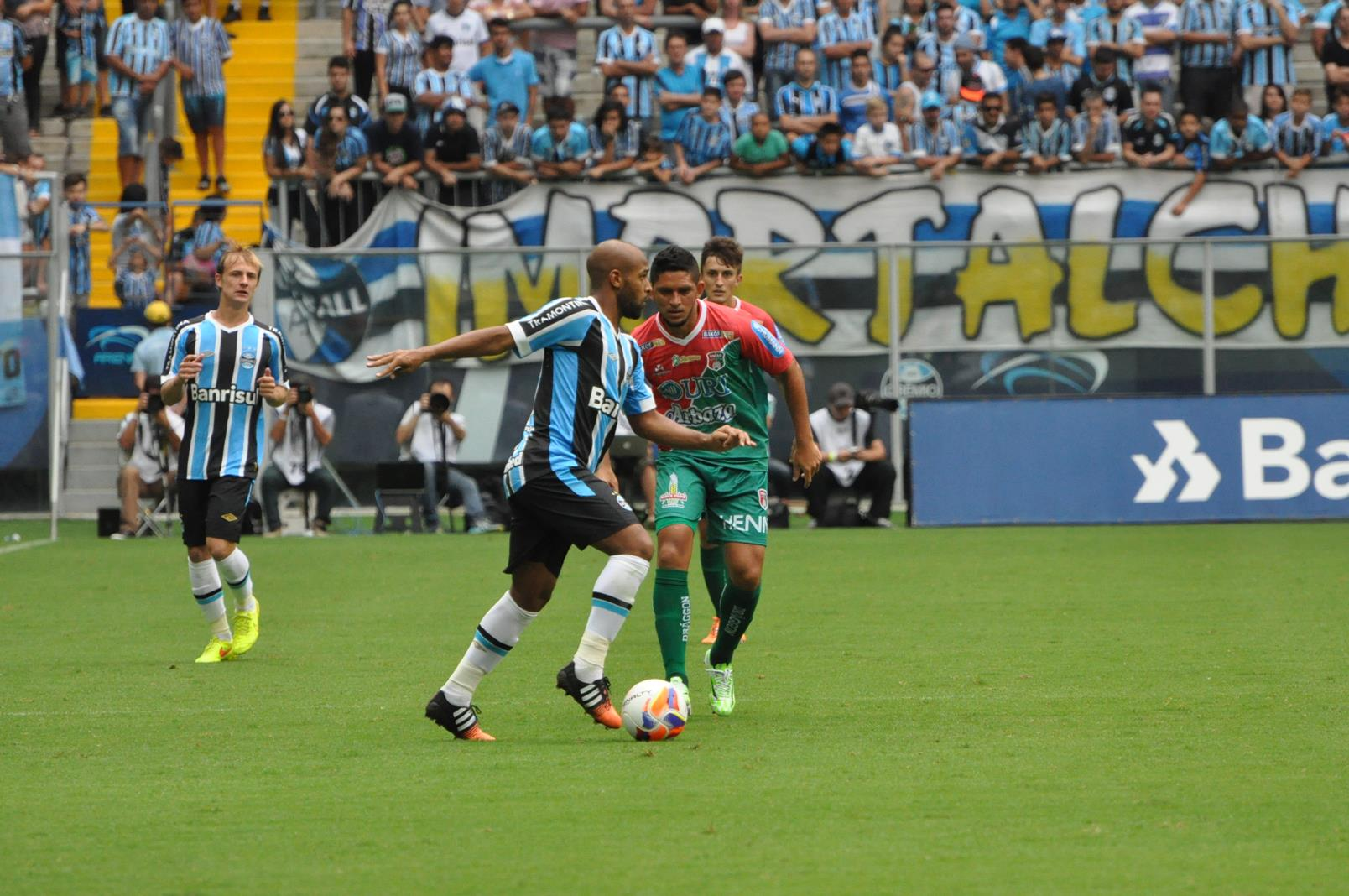
Grêmio vs. União Frederiquense for 2015 Campeonato Gaúcho

Internacional is the biggest winner of the competition, with 46 titles, followed by Grêmio with 44 titles and Guarany of Bagé with two titles.

== History ==
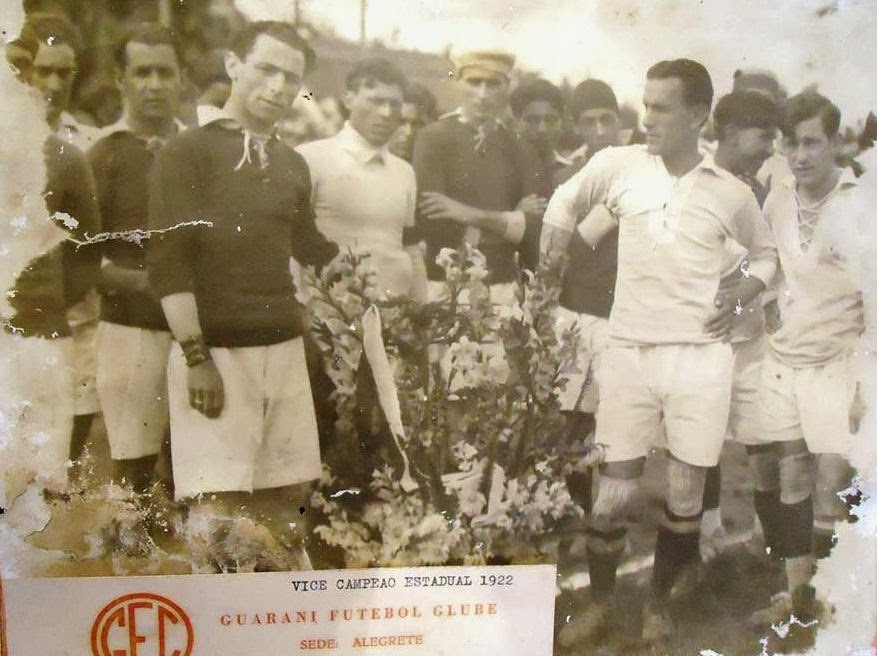
Final of the Campeonato Gaúcho of 1922 between Guarani FC from Alegrete and Grêmio

The first edition of the Campeonato Gaúcho was scheduled to take place in 1918, featuring the teams Esporte Clube 14 de Julho representing Santana do Livramento, Brasil de Pelotas, and Esporte Clube Cruzeiro from Porto Alegre in a final triangular. However, due to an outbreak of Spanish flu in Rio Grande do Sul, the tournament was cancelled and postponed until the epidemic subsided. In 1919, with the end of the epidemic, the first edition of the tournament was finally held. In December 2021, the Federação Gaúcha de Futebol recognised the three participating clubs from the 1918 edition as "Honorary Champions.", connecting the struggles with the Spanish flu the COVID-19 pandemic.

The original plan of the organisers was to include representatives from various cities and regions. However, the representatives from Bagé (Guarany Futebol Clube), Cruz Alta (unknown club), Santana do Livramento (Esporte Clube 14 de Julhoo), São Leopoldo (Sport Club Nacional), and Uruguaiana (Esporte Clube Uruguaiana were unable to register their players in time and were therefore eliminated. As a result, only the representatives from Pelotas and Porto Alegre remained: Brasil and Grêmio. Brasil de Pelotas emerged as the champions of the tournament.

Until 1960, the Campeonato Gaúcho was contested on a regional basis, using a knockout system between the champion of the capital and a variable number of other clubs representing regions of the state. For this reason, until 1960, there had never been more than one team from Porto Alegre among the top four finishers—in fact, there had never been more than one representative from the capital competing in the championship.

During this period, Grêmio reached the final 18 times against the champion from the interior, winning 12 times and losing 6. Internacional, on the other hand, were crowned champions of Porto Alegre in 16 seasons and, when facing the champion from the interior, won 15 times and lost only once—against Rio Grande in 1936. The other Porto Alegre clubs that reached the finals of the Campeonato Gaúcho under this regional format (Americano in 1928, Cruzeiro-RS in 1929, and Renner in 1954) all won their matches against the interior clubs.

Thus, in 42 years of the championship under this format, there were 30 victories for the capital compared to 7 for the interior. The Campeonato Gaúcho was not held in 1923 and 1924 due to the Revolution of 1923. Additionally, the main teams from Porto Alegre did not participate in 1937, 1938, and 1939 due to a split within the AMGEA (Associação Metropolitana Gaúcha de Esportes Atléticos) over the adoption of professionalism between clubs and their players.

From 1961 onwards, the Campeonato Gaúcho was unified, with the top clubs from the capital and the interior competing for the title in the top division, and a promotion and relegation system (which varied over time) for the lower divisions.

In the first seven years after unification (1961–67), the Campeonato Gaúcho was contested by 12 clubs in a double round-robin format. Between 1968 and 1971, with the number of clubs increasing to 18 (later 25 and 23), a preliminary qualifying phase was introduced, but the final phase, contested by 8 clubs, remained a double round-robin. In 1972, the final phase expanded to 10 clubs under the same format.

In 1973–74, with more of the year dedicated to the Campeonato Brasileiro, the preliminary phase of the Gauchão no longer included the Grenal duo (Grêmio and Internacional). For the first time, the final phase was contested using the "Fórmula Fraga" system, with two independent rounds. [The "Fórmula Fraga" is the Brazilian term for tournaments played in two independent rounds, with separate points tallies, but with only one champion, determined by a final match between the winners of each round.] In 1975–77, the "Fórmula Fraga" became more complex, with three independent phases, though the first round served as a qualifier for the subsequent phases, which were contested by only 4 teams (8 in 1977). In 1978, the championship format became so convoluted that Grêmio found themselves in a position where they had to lose a match to secure their place in the final phase.

== Qualification for competitions ==
The best placed of league qualify for the next year's Campeonato Brasileiro Série D, excluding the teams having already qualified for the Série A, Série B, Série C or Série D by other means. The worst placed are relegated to the Campeonato Gaúcho Série A2.

The winner of the Campeonato Gaúcho faces the winner of the state cup Copa FGF at the super cup Recopa Gaúcha.

== Champions ==
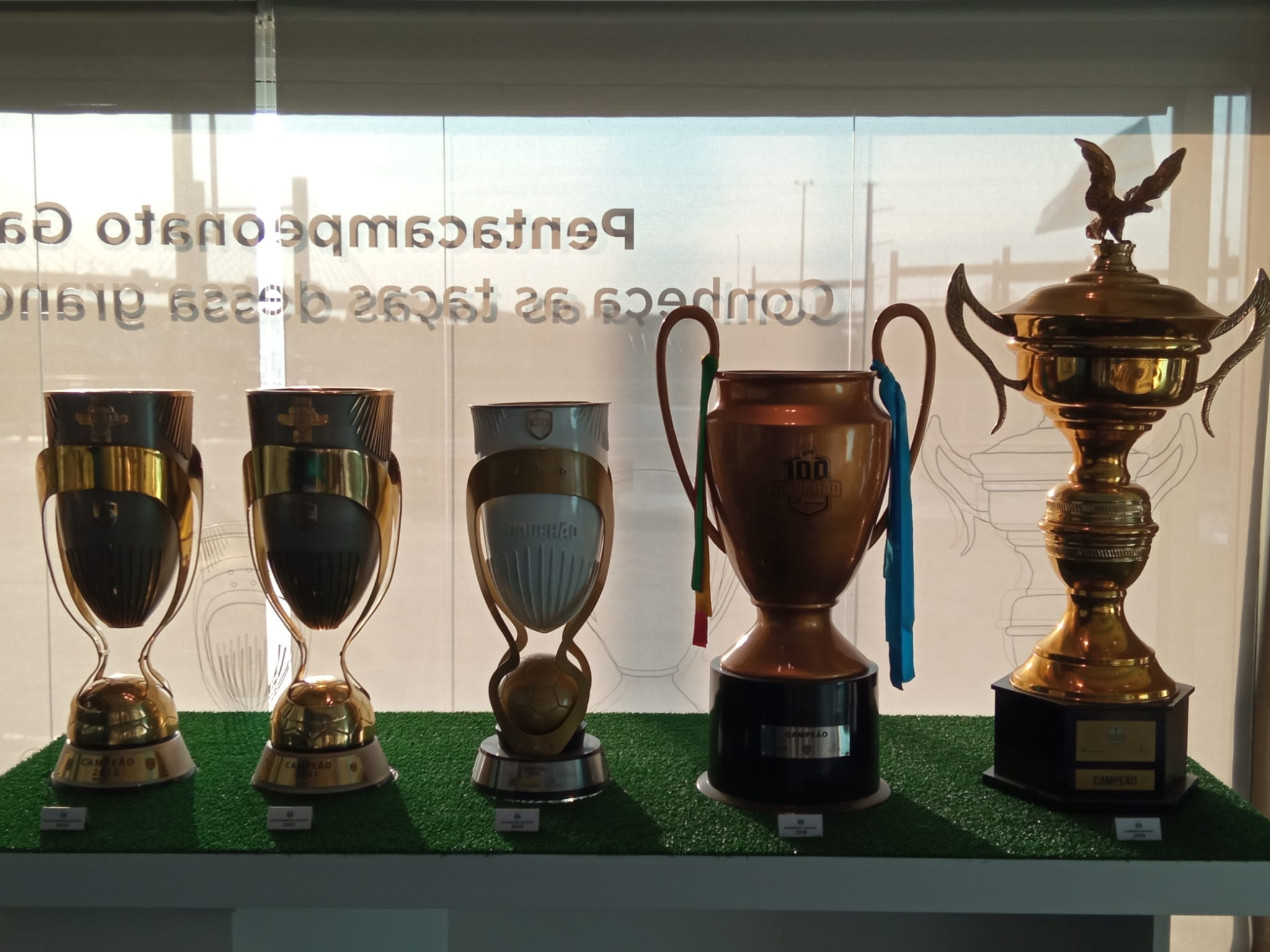
Grêmio's Campeonato Gaúcho trophies

=== Amateur era ===
Season	Champions	Runners-up
1919	Brasil de Pelotas (1)	Grêmio
1920	Guarany de Bagé (1)	Grêmio
1921	Grêmio (1)	Riograndense (SM)
1922	Grêmio (2)	Guarany de Alegrete
1923	Not held (Revolution of 1923)	
1924	Not held (Revolution of 1923)	
1925	Bagé (1)	Grêmio
1926	Grêmio (3)	Guarany de Bagé
1927	Internacional (1)	Bagé
1928	Americano (1)	Bagé
1929	Cruzeiro (1)	Guarany de Bagé
1930	Pelotas (1)	Grêmio
1931	Grêmio (4)	Guarany de Alegrete
1932	Grêmio (5)	Pelotas
1933	São Paulo (1)	Grêmio
1934	Internacional (2)	Grêmio
1935	9º Regimento (1)	Grêmio
1936	Rio Grande (1)	Internacional
1937	Grêmio Santanense (1)	Rio-Grandense (RG)
1938	Guarany de Bagé (2)	Rio-Grandense (RG)
1939	Rio-Grandense (RG) (1)	Grêmio Santanense

=== Professional era ===
Season	Champions	Runners-up
1940	Internacional (3)	Bagé
1941	Internacional (4)	Rio Grande
1942	Internacional (5)	Floriano
1943	Internacional (6)	Guarany (CS)
1944	Internacional (7)	Bagé
1945	Internacional (8)	Pelotas
1946	Grêmio (6)	Rio-Grandense (RG)
1947	Internacional (9)	Floriano
1948	Internacional (10)	Grêmio Santanense
1949	Grêmio (7)	Floriano
1950	Internacional (11)	Floriano
1951	Internacional (12)	Pelotas
1952	Internacional (13)	Floriano
1953	Internacional (14)	Brasil de Pelotas
1954	Renner (1)	Brasil de Pelotas
1955	Internacional (15)	Brasil de Pelotas
1956	Grêmio (8)	Pelotas
1957	Grêmio (9)	Bagé
1958	Grêmio (10)	Guarany de Bagé
1959	Grêmio (11)	Farroupilha
1960	Grêmio (12)	Pelotas
1961	Internacional (16)	Grêmio
1962	Grêmio (13)	Internacional
1963	Grêmio (14)	Internacional
1964	Grêmio (15)	Internacional
1965	Grêmio (16)	Juventude
1966	Grêmio (17)	Internacional
1967	Grêmio (18)	Internacional
1968	Grêmio (19)	Internacional
1969	Internacional (17)	Grêmio
1970	Internacional (18)	Grêmio
1971	Internacional (19)	Grêmio
1972	Internacional (20)	Grêmio
1973	Internacional (21)	Grêmio
1974	Internacional (22)	Grêmio
1975	Internacional (23)	Grêmio
1976	Internacional (24)	Grêmio
1977	Grêmio (20)	Internacional
1978	Internacional (25)	Grêmio
1979	Grêmio (21)	Esportivo
1980	Grêmio (22)	Internacional
1981	Internacional (26)	Grêmio
1982	Internacional (27)	Grêmio
1983	Internacional (28)	Brasil de Pelotas
1984	Internacional (29)	Grêmio
1985	Grêmio (23)	Internacional
1986	Grêmio (24)	Internacional
1987	Grêmio (25)	Internacional
1988	Grêmio (26)	Internacional
1989	Grêmio (27)	Internacional
1990	Grêmio (28)	Caxias
1991	Internacional (30)	Grêmio
1992	Internacional (31)	Grêmio
1993	Grêmio (29)	Internacional
1994	Internacional (32)	Juventude
1995	Grêmio (30)	Internacional
1996	Grêmio (31)	Juventude
1997	Internacional (33)	Grêmio
1998	Juventude (1)	Internacional
1999	Grêmio (32)	Internacional
2000	Caxias (1)	Grêmio
2001	Grêmio (33)	Juventude
2002	Internacional (34)	15 de Novembro
2003	Internacional (35)	15 de Novembro
2004	Internacional (36)	Ulbra
2005	Internacional (37)	15 de Novembro
2006	Grêmio (34)	Internacional
2007	Grêmio (35)	Juventude
2008	Internacional (38)	Juventude
2009	Internacional (39)	Grêmio
2010	Grêmio (36)	Internacional
2011	Internacional (40)	Grêmio
2012	Internacional (41)	Caxias
2013	Internacional (42)	Lajeadense
2014	Internacional (43)	Grêmio
2015	Internacional (44)	Grêmio
2016	Internacional (45)	Juventude
2017	Novo Hamburgo (1)	Internacional
2018	Grêmio (37)	Brasil de Pelotas
2019	Grêmio (38)	Internacional
2020	Grêmio (39)	Caxias
2021	Grêmio (40)	Internacional
2022	Grêmio (41)	Ypiranga
2023	Grêmio (42)	Caxias
2024	Grêmio (43)	Juventude
2025	Internacional (46)	Grêmio
2026	Grêmio (44)	Internacional

=== Notes ===
- 9º Regimento de Pelotas is the currently GA Farroupilha.
- Floriano is the currently EC Novo Hamburgo.
- Ulbra is the currently Canoas SC.

== Titles by team ==
Teams in bold still active.

Rank	Club	Winners	Winning years	Runners-up	Runners-up years
1	**Internacional**	46	1927, 1934, 1940, 1941, 1942, 1943, 1944, 1945, 1947, 1948, 1950, 1951, 1952, 1953, 1955, 1961, 1969, 1970, 1971, 1972, 1973, 1974, 1975, 1976, 1978, 1981, 1982, 1983, 1984, 1991, 1992, 1994, 1997, 2002, 2003, 2004, 2005, 2008, 2009, 2011, 2012, 2013, 2014, 2015, 2016, 2025	24	1936, 1962, 1963, 1964, 1966, 1967, 1968, 1977, 1980, 1985, 1986, 1987, 1988, 1989, 1993, 1995, 1998, 1999, 2006, 2010, 2017, 2019, 2021, 2026
2	**Grêmio**	44	1921, 1922, 1926, 1931, 1932, 1946, 1949, 1956, 1957, 1958, 1959, 1960, 1962, 1963, 1964, 1965, 1966, 1967, 1968, 1977, 1979, 1980, 1985, 1986, 1987, 1988, 1989, 1990, 1993, 1995, 1996, 1999, 2001, 2006, 2007, 2010, 2018, 2019, 2020, 2021, 2022, 2023, 2024, 2026	28	1919, 1920, 1925, 1930, 1933, 1935, 1961, 1969, 1970, 1971, 1972, 1973, 1974, 1975, 1976, 1978, 1981, 1982, 1984, 1991, 1992, 1997, 2000, 2009, 2011, 2014, 2015, 2025
3	**Guarany de Bagé**	2	1920, 1938	3	1926, 1929, 1958
4	**Juventude**	1	1998	8	1965, 1994, 1996, 2001, 2007, 2008, 2016, 2024
5	**Bagé**	1	1925	5	1927, 1928, 1940, 1944, 1957
5	**Brasil de Pelotas**	1	1919	5	1953, 1954, 1955, 1983, 2018
5	**Pelotas**	1	1930	5	1932, 1945, 1951, 1956, 1960
5	**Novo Hamburgo**	1	2017	5	1942, 1947, 1949, 1950, 1952
9	**Caxias**	1	2000	4	1990, 2012, 2020, 2023
10	**Rio-Grandense (RG)**	1	1939	3	1937, 1938, 1946
11	**Farroupilha**	1	1935	2	1934, 1959
11	Grêmio Santanense	1	1937	2	1939, 1948
13	**Rio Grande**	1	1936	1	1941
14	Americano	1	1928	0	—
14	**Cruzeiro**	1	1929	0	—
14	Renner	1	1954	0	—
14	**São Paulo**	1	1933	0	—
18	15 de Novembro	0	—	3	2002, 2003, 2005
19	Guarany de Alegrete	0	—	2	1922, 1931
20	Canoas	0	—	1	2004
20	**Esportivo**	0	—	1	1979
20	Guarany (CS)	0	—	1	1943
20	**Lajeadense**	0	—	1	2013
20	Riograndense (SM)	0	—	1	1921
20	**Ypiranga**	0	—	1	2022

=== By city ===
City	Championships	Clubs
Porto Alegre	93	Internacional (46), Grêmio (44), Americano (1), Cruzeiro (1), Renner (1)
Bagé	3	Guarany (2), Bagé (1)
Pelotas	3	Brasil de Pelotas (1), Farroupilha (1), Pelotas (1)
Rio Grande	3	Rio Grande (1), Rio-Grandense (1), São Paulo (1)
Caxias do Sul	2	Caxias (1), Juventude (1)
Novo Hamburgo	1	Novo Hamburgo (1)
Santana do Livramento	1	Grêmio Santanense (1)

== Participation ==
=== Most appearances ===
As of 2025 season

Below is the list of clubs that have more appearances in the Campeonato Gaúcho.

Club	App	First	Last
Grêmio	83	1919	2025
Internacional	81	1927	2025
Novo Hamburgo	73	1930	2024
Caxias	63	1961	2025
Juventude	63	1925	2025
Brasil de Pelotas	61	1919	2025
Pelotas	57	1930	2025
Esportivo	45	1970	2023
Santa Cruz	45	1932	2024
São José	41	1961	2025
Aimoré	36	1961	2023
Inter de Santa Maria	36	1942	2011
Guarany de Bagé	35	1920	2025
São Luiz	34	1974	2025
São Paulo	33	1933	2018
Ypiranga	33	1968	2025

- SER Caxias includes the participations of "Associação Caxias de Futebol" (1972–1975), when GE Flamengo and EC Juventude were merged.

== Records and statistics ==
=== All-time topscorers ===
- Sandro Sotilli: 111 goals.

== See also ==
- Campeonato Gaúcho Série A2
- Campeonato Gaúcho Série B
- Copa FGF
- Recopa Gaúcha
- Super Copa Gaúcha
- Copa Metropolitana
- Copa Sul-Fronteira
- Copa Serrana
