= 1919 Campeonato Gaúcho =

Sports league season

Campeonato Gaúcho
- Season: 1919
- Champions: Brasil de Pelotas (1st title)
- Matches: 1

The 1919 Campeonato Gaúcho was the first season of Rio Grande do Sul's top association football league. Brasil de Pelotas won the title for the first time.

== Format ==
The championship was originally going to be contested by the four regional champions in a single round-robin system, with the team with the most points winning the title. The two teams that were able to compete played a single match in order to determine state champions.

== Qualified teams ==
Club	Location	Qualification method
Brasil de Pelotas	Pelotas	Champions of the Second Region and the 1919 Pelotas City Championship
Grêmio	Porto Alegre	Champions of the First Region and the 1919 Porto Alegre City Championship

Originally, Nacional from São Leopoldo, Guarany from Bagé, 14 de Julho from Santana do Livramento, Uruguaiana from Uruguaiana and an unknown team from Cruz Alta would compete. However, these teams could not register their players in time.

== Championship ==
Pos	Team	Pld	W	D	L	GF	GA	GD	Pts
1	Brasil de Pelotas (C)	1	0	0	1	5	1	+4	0
2	Grêmio	1	1	0	0	1	5	−4	2

(C) Champions
9 November 1919
16:00

Grêmio	1–5	Brasil de Pelotas
Máximo Laviaguerre 28'	Report	Proença 12' 49' 71'; Correa 19'; Alvariza 51'

Estádio da Baixada, Porto Alegre
Attendance: 3,500
Referee: (Brazil) Oscar Carneiro de Fontoura

== Notes ==
A. Fonts differ about who scored Brasil de Pelota's goals. RSSSF Brasil cites two goals by Proença and three by Ignácio. Both Diário de Viamão and Futebol Nacional cites three goals by Proença at 11' or 12', 49' and 71' and a goal by Alvariza at 51', differing on the scorer of the second goal, where the former cites Farias at 18' and the latter cites Correa at 19'.
