= Grêmio Foot-Ball Santanense =

Grêmio Santanense
- Full name: Grêmio Foot-Ball Santanense
- Nickname(s): Santanense; Colorado; Carapintada
- Founded: June 11, 1913
- Ground: Estádio Honório Nunes, Santana do Livramento, Rio Grande do Sul state, Brazil
- Capacity: 8,000
Home colours	Away colours

Grêmio Foot-Ball Santanense, commonly known as Grêmio Santanense, is a Brazilian football club based in Santana do Livramento, Rio Grande do Sul and part of the state league competition in the state of Rio Grande do Sul. They won the Campeonato Gaúcho in 1937.

== History ==
The club was founded on June 11, 1913, adopting Grêmio's name and Internacional's colors. They won the Campeonato Gaúcho in 1937, and the Série A3 in 1967. Grêmio Santanense also won the Campeonato do Interior Gaúcho in 1937 and in 1948.

== Honours ==
=== State ===
- Campeonato Gaúcho
  - Winners (1): 1937
  - Runners-up (2): 1939, 1948
- Campeonato Gaúcho Série A2
  - Runners-up (1): 1991
- Campeonato Gaúcho Série B
  - Winners (1): 1967
  - Runners-up (1): 2000
- Campeonato do Interior Gaúcho
  - Winners (2): 1937, 1948

=== City ===
- Campeonato Citadino de Santana do Livramento
  - Winners (19): 1922, 1923, 1925, 1933, 1935, 1936, 1937, 1938, 1939, 1946, 1948, 1953, 1957, 1961, 1962, 1963, 1967, 1975, 1977

== Stadium ==
Grêmio Foot-Ball Santanense play their home games at Estádio Honório Nunes. The stadium has a maximum capacity of 8,000 people.
