= Clube 15 de Novembro =

15 de Novembro
- Full name: Clube 15 de Novembro
- Nickname(s): 15; Tricolour
- Founded: 15 November 1911; 113 years ago
- Ground: Estádio Sady Arnildo Schmidt
- Capacity: 4,000
- Chairman: Marco Aurélio Feltes
- 2014: Segunda Divisão, 9th
Home colours	Away colours

Clube 15 de Novembro, or 15 de Novembro (also known as 15 de Campo Bom) as they are usually called, is a Brazilian football team from Campo Bom in Rio Grande do Sul, founded on 15 November 1911.

== History ==
- On 3 March 1893, the Sociedade Alemã de Atiradores (German Society of Riflemen, or Deutscher Schüetzen Verein) is founded.
- On 15 November 1911, the Esporte Clube 15 de Novembro is founded by employees of Vetter & Irmãos.
- On 3 October 1917, the Sociedade Alemã de Atiradores is renamed to Sociedade Concórdia.
- On 30 April 1975, Sociedade Concórdia and Esporte Clube 15 de Novembro merged into Clube 15 de Novembro.
- In 1994 Clube 15 de Novembro becomes a professional club, and play in the Campeonato Gaúcho Second Division. The team finished in second position, being promoted to First Division Série B.
- In 2002, the team was Campeonato Gaúcho runner-up, being defeated by Internacional in the final matches.
- In 2003, the team was again Campeonato Gaúcho runner-up. Again, the club was defeated by Internacional in the final matches.
- In 2004, the club reached Copa do Brasil semifinals, being eliminated by Santo André.
- In 2005, 15 de Novembro was Campeonato Gaúcho runner-up. Internacional defeated again the club in the final matches.
- In 2006, 15 de Novembro was champion of the Copa Emídio Perondi.

== Honours ==
- Campeonato Gaúcho
  - Runner-up (3): 2002, 2003, 2005
- Campeonato Gaúcho Série A2
  - Runners-up (2): 1994, 1999
- Copa Emídio Perondi
  - Winners (1): 2006
- Campeonato do Interior Gaúcho
  - Winners (3): 2002, 2003, 2005

== 2004 Copa do Brasil ==
First Round

15 de Novembro – Portuguesa Santista 1-1 2-2

Second Round

15 de Novembro – Vasco 1-1 3-0

Third Round

Americano – 15 de Novembro 1-2 2-3

Quarterfinals

15 de Novembro – Palmas 3-0 1-0

Semifinals

Santo André – 15 de Novembro 3-4 3-1

== Anthem ==
The club's anthem was composed by Sérgio Ricardo Schirmer. He was a 15 de Novembro affiliate. He was born on 3 May 1966, and died on 23 September 2002. The anthem is entitled "Grande Tricolor", which means "Great Tricolour" in English.

There is also another anthem, created by the 15 de Novembro's athletes Almir Maciel de Oliveira and Valmir Alves. This anthem was created in the 1960s, during the club's amateur era, and was sung by the club's players and supporters.
