= Grêmio Atlético Farroupilha =

Farroupilha
- Full name: Grêmio Atlético Farroupilha
- Nickname(s): Fantasma; Farrapo; Tricolor do Fragata
- Founded: April 26, 1926
- Ground: Estádio Nicolau Fico, Pelotas, Rio Grande do Sul state, Brazil
- Capacity: 5,000
Home colours	Away colours

Grêmio Atlético Farroupilha, commonly known as Farroupilha, is a Brazilian football club based in Pelotas, Rio Grande do Sul and part of state league competition in the state of Rio Grande do Sul. They won the Campeonato Gaúcho in 1935. The club until 1941 was formerly known as Grêmio Atlético do 9° Regimento.

== History ==
The club was founded on April 26, 1926, as Grêmio Atlético do 9° Regimento. They won the Campeonato Gaúcho in 1935. Farroupilha won the Campeonato do Interior Gaúcho in 1934, 1935, 1969, 1961 and in 1967. The club was renamed to Grêmio Atlético Farroupilha in 1941, as the law prohibited civilian institutions, such as sports clubs, to use military names.

== Honours ==
=== State ===
- Campeonato Gaúcho
  - Winners (1): 1935
  - Runners-up (2): 1934, 1959
- Campeonato Gaúcho Série B
  - Runners-up (2): 2001, 2018
- Campeonato do Interior Gaúcho
  - Winners (5): 1934, 1935, 1959, 1961, 1967

=== City ===
- Campeonato Citadino de Pelotas
  - Winners (6): 1934, 1935, 1936, 1938, 1943, 1959

== Stadium ==
Grêmio Atlético Farroupilha play their home games at Estádio Nicolau Fico. The stadium has a maximum capacity of 5,000 people.
