= Sport Club Rio Grande =

Rio Grande
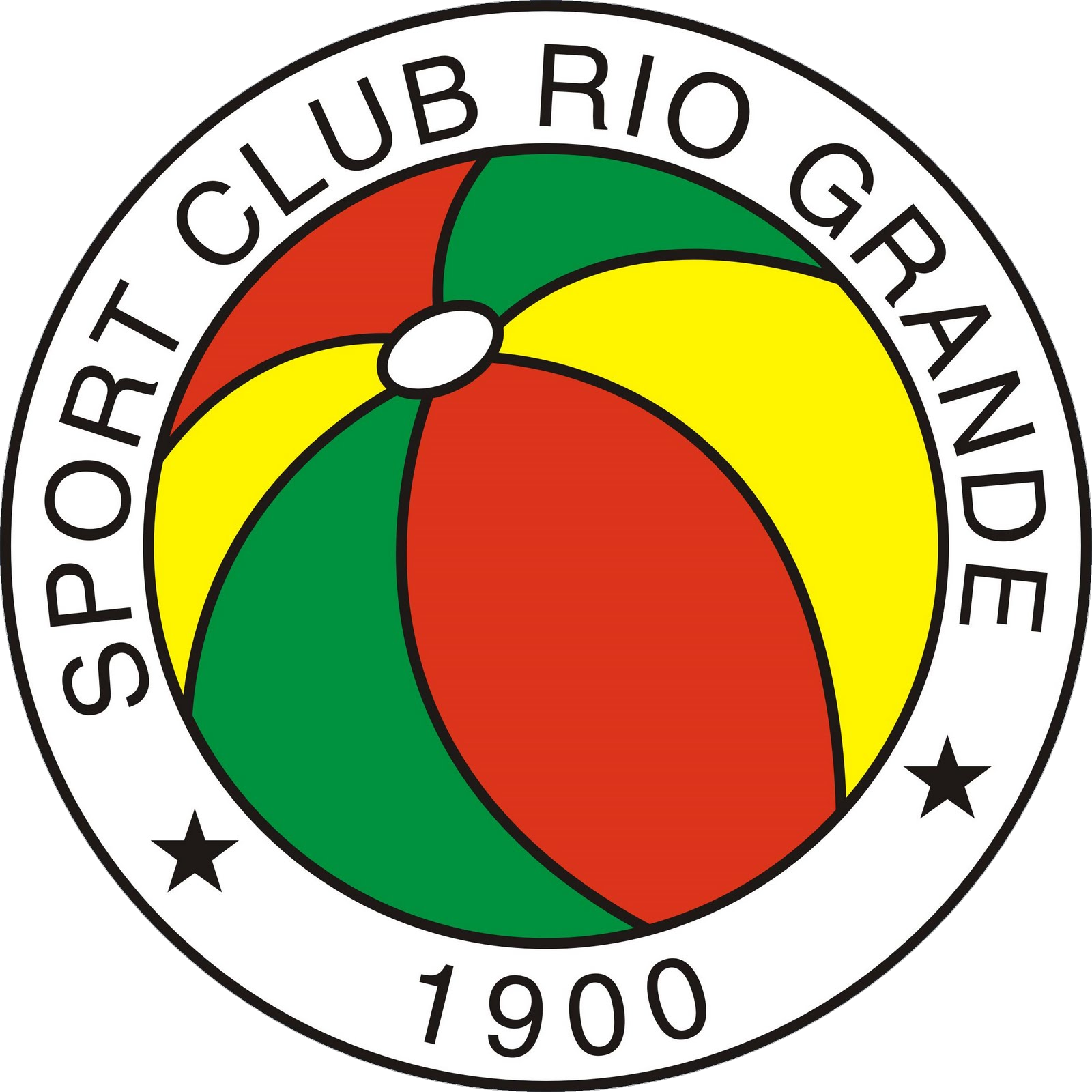
- Full name: Sport Club Rio Grande
- Nicknames: Vovô (The Grandfather); Veterano (The Veteran)
- Founded: July 12, 1900
- Ground: Estádio Arthur Lawson
- Capacity: 5,000
- League: Campeonato Gaúcho Série B Copa FGF
Home colours	Away colours

Sport Club Rio Grande is a professional association football club based in Rio Grande, Rio Grande do Sul, Brazil. Founded in July 1900, they are Brazil's oldest active football club.

They play in the Campeonato Gaúcho Série B and has played at state level since its founding. The club also won the Campeonato Gaúcho in 1936; its greatest achievement to date.

== History ==
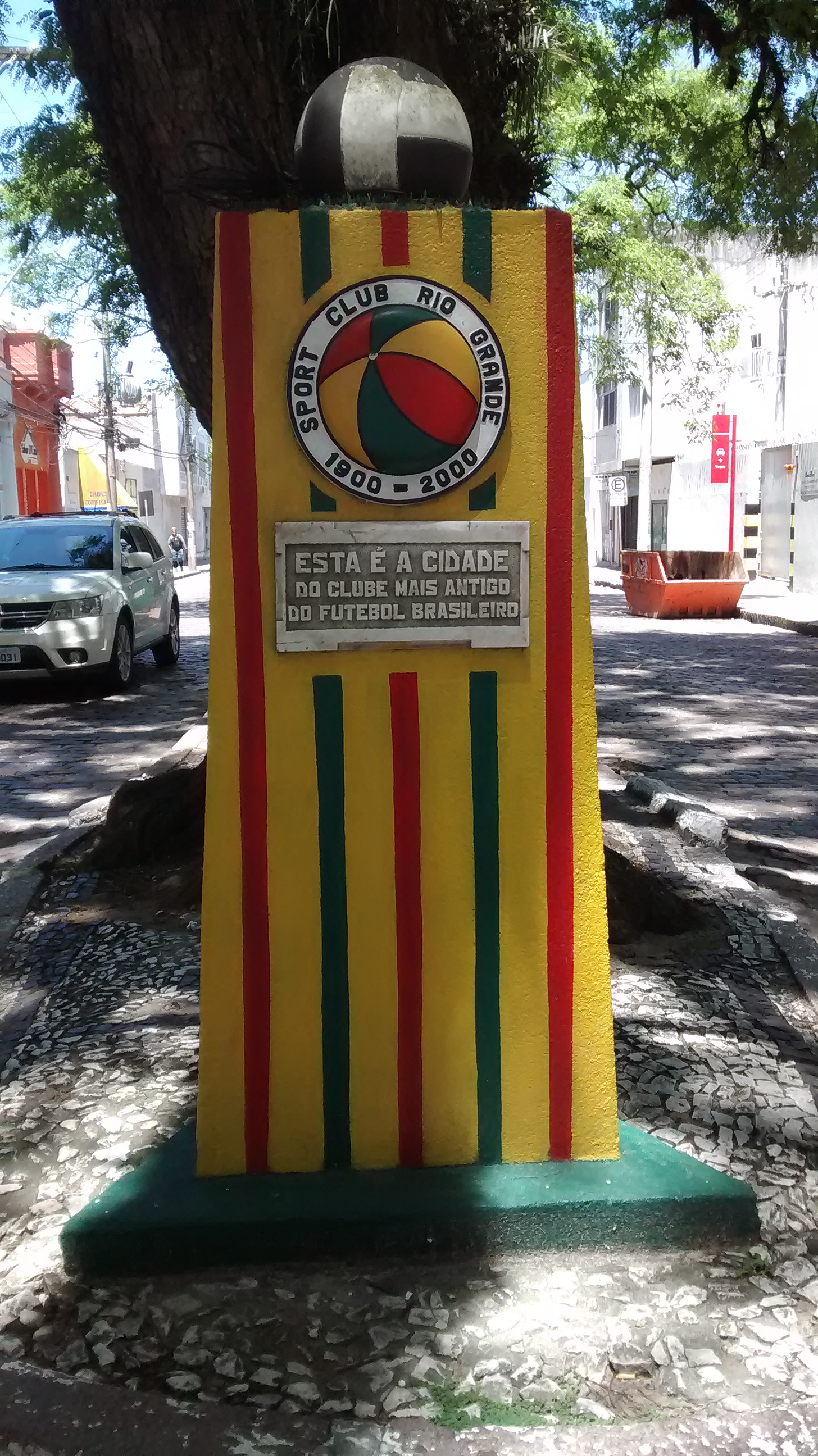
Monument to Sport Club Rio Grande in Rio Grande

Sport Club Rio Grande were founded on July 19, 1900, by the German Johannes Christian Moritz Minnemann and a group of friends, during the celebrations of his 25th anniversary. The colours chosen were a red, green and yellow tricolor, directly taken from the flag of Rio Grande do Sul.

The club did exhibition games all over the state of Rio Grande do Sul; in 1901 the club played a friendly match against the football club of the sailors from British ship HMS Nymphe. In 1903 the club went to Porto Alegre to do an exhibition, the first football game in the city. This match directly inspired the founding of Grêmio Foot-Ball Porto Alegrense, one of Brazil's largest clubs, and later a member of the G-12 in the same year.

The club won its first achievement, which is the Campeonato Gaúcho, in 1936. In 1962 the club won the Campeonato Gaúcho Série A2, the second division and in 2014 the Campeonato Gaúcho Série B, the third division. Thus, Rio Grande is one of the few clubs in Rio Grande do Sul to have won all the three state divisions.

Brazil's National Football Day is celebrated on July 19 in honor of Sport Club Rio Grande's condition as Brazil's oldest football club.

In 2020, Rio Grande sued Ponte Preta for using the slogan "oldest team in Brazil". Both clubs were created in the same year in 1900 but Ponte Preta was founded in August while Rio Grande was founded a month earlier. While São Paulo's SPAC, Internacional, Germania and Mackenzie College, although created before the Rio Grande do Sul team, had already officially closed their football departments. In 2022 the case was decided in favor of Rio Grande and Ponte Preta had to remove any mentions that it was "the oldest team in Brazil" and pay R$2 million in compensation.

== Stadium ==
Rio Grande play their home games at Estádio Arthur Lawson. The stadium has a maximum capacity of 5,000 people, and was inaugurated on August 31, 1985.

== Honours ==
=== Official tournaments ===
State
Competitions	Titles	Seasons
Campeonato Gaúcho	1	1936
Campeonato Gaúcho Série A2	1	1962
Campeonato Gaúcho Série B	1	2014

=== Others tournaments ===
==== State ====
- Campeonato do Interior Gaúcho (2): 1936, 1941
- Torneio Centenário da Independência (1): 1922

==== City ====
- Campeonato Citadino de Rio Grande (17): 1914, 1919, 1922, 1926, 1934, 1936, 1956, 1941, 1942, 1944, 1949, 1951, 1961, 1962, 1964, 1965, 2001

=== Runners-up ===
- Campeonato Gaúcho (1): 1941
- Campeonato Gaúcho Série B (1): 1985

== Derby ==
The derby between SC São Paulo and Rio Grande is known as Rio-Rita.
