= Futebol Clube Santa Cruz =

Brazilian football club

Santa Cruz
- Full name: Futebol Clube Santa Cruz
- Nickname(s): Galo
- Founded: March 26, 1913; 112 years ago
- Ground: Plátanos, Santa Cruz do Sul, Brazil
- Capacity: 7,000
- Chairman: Tiago Rech
- League: Campeonato Gaúcho Série A2
- 2019: 7th
Home colours	Away colours

Futebol Clube Santa Cruz is a Brazilian football club from Santa Cruz do Sul, Rio Grande do Sul, founded on March 26, 1913. It plays in the Campeonato Gaúcho Série A2. Its rival is Esporte Clube Avenida.

== History ==
Santa Cruz was founded on March 26, 1913 when a group of young men led by André Klarmann met at the Hotel Schmidt in the center of Santa Cruz do Sul, to set up a new football club.

In 1920, the club built a stadium, Estádio dos Plátanos.

In 1944, a group of surplus players from Santa Cruz decided to leave the club and found their own, which became known as Esporte Clube Avenida. The two clubs soon became rivals and developed a derby known as "Ave-Cruz", which stands to this day.

Due to financial problems that both clubs had, from 1974 to 1978 Santa Cruz and Avenida merged, forming the Associação Santa Cruz de Futebol. However, internal issues between the boards of both clubs soon led to the separation.

In February 2012, TV cameras caught a single Santa Cruz fan at the Olímpico Monumental, in Porto Alegre, celebrating the team's only goal in a 4–1 defeat against Grêmio for the 2012 Campeonato Gaúcho. Shortly afterwards, they discovered that it was Tiago Rech, a journalist born in Santa Cruz do Sul who worked near the stadium and went to watch his favorite team. In 2013, after returning from the United States, Rech took over as the club's press officer and, shortly afterwards, was elected president. The club was playing at the Campeonato Gaúcho Série B — the third state division — and with severe debt issues. Rech restructured the club, which soon paid off as Santa Cruz conquered the 2020 Copa FGF, the Rio Grande do Sul state cup. He again made international headlines now as the "lonely fan" who became president and won a title for his club. The victory at the Copa FGF gave the club a spot at the 2021 Copa do Brasil, where it was eliminated in the first round to Joinville. The club also won a spot at the state supercup Recopa Gaúcha, where it lost 3–0 to Grêmio.

Just 7 months after the FGF Cup title, Santa Cruz was crowned champion again, this time in the 2021 Campeonato Gaúcho Série B (equivalent to the third state division) in an unprecedented way, playing against Gaúcho from Passo Fundo. Santa Cruz lost the first game 2–0 in Passo Fundo, but won 4–2 in the return fixture at home with midfielder Leylon scoring a hat-trick and took everything to penalties, eventually prevailing 3–2.

In 2023, Santa Cruz was crowned Campeonato Gaúcho Série A2 champions after winning against Guarany from Bagé. The first game at Bagé was a 0-0 draw, while the return game in Santa Cruz do Sul ended 1–1. Santa Cruz won in a penalty shootout 5–4. Additionally, the club was promoted to the Campeonato Gaúcho after 10 years outside the first division.

== Honours ==
=== Official tournaments ===
State
Competitions	Titles	Seasons
Copa FGF	1	2020
Campeonato Gaúcho Série A2	1	2023
Campeonato Gaúcho Série B	1	2021

=== Others tournaments ===
==== City ====
- Campeonato Citadino de Santa Cruz do Sul (7): 1947, 1948, 1949, 1950, 1951, 1952, 1953
- Copa Centenário de Santa Cruz do Sul (1): 2013
- Copa dos Vales/Taça CIGHA (1): 2017

=== Runners-up ===
- Recopa Gaúcha (1): 2021
- Campeonato Gaúcho Série A2 (2): 1952, 1983
