= Sport Club São Paulo =

São Paulo
- Full name: Sport Club São Paulo
- Nicknames: Leão do Parque; Caturrita
- Founded: 4 October 1908; 117 years ago
- Ground: Aldo Dapuzzo
- Capacity: 7,000
- President: Domingos Escovar
- Head coach: Vosmir Fabian
- League: Campeonato Gaúcho Série B
- 2025: Gaúcho Série B, 3rd of 9
Home colours	Away colours

Sport Club São Paulo, commonly referred to as São Paulo-RS, is a Brazilian football club based in Rio Grande, Rio Grande do Sul. It currently plays in Campeonato Gaúcho Série B, the third level of the Rio Grande do Sul state football league. They competed in the Série A three times (1979, 1980 and 1982).

== History ==
Sport Club São Paulo were founded on October 4, 1908, by Adolpho Corrêa and other young sportsmen. The club were named São Paulo after Adolpho Corrêa's home city. São Paulo won their first title, which was the Campeonato Gaúcho, in 1933. They won the Copa Bento Gonçalves in 1985.

The club competed in the Série A three times. São Paulo's first participation was in 1979, when they finished in the 42nd place. The club competed again in 1980, finishing in the 41st place. They competed for the last time in 1982, when they ended in the 31st place in the league.

On 6 October 2021 William Ribeiro was charged with attempted murder after kicking a referee in the head during a league match against Guarani after Rodrigo Crivellaro awarded a foul against him on 4 October 2021.

== Stadium ==
São Paulo play their home games at Estádio Aldo Dapuzzo. The stadium has a maximum capacity of 10,000 people.

== Current squad ==
As of 22 January 2018.

Note: Flags indicate national team as defined under FIFA eligibility rules; some limited exceptions apply. Players may hold more than one non-FIFA nationality.

No.	Pos.	Nation	Player
-	GK	BRA	Nicolas
-	GK	BRA	Régis
-	GK	BRA	Medina
-	GK	BRA	Denzel
-	DF	BRA	Thiago Machado
-	DF	BRA	Jeferson Falcão
-	DF	BRA	Felipe
-	DF	BRA	Anderson Pico
-	DF	BRA	Bruno Oliveira
-	DF	BRA	Guilherme Almeida
-	DF	BRA	Rudigullithi
-	DF	BRA	Marcelo Carvalho
-	DF	BRA	Ricardo Bierhals
-	DF	BRA	Pedro
-	MF	BRA	Leanderson
-	MF	BRA	Marcelo Labarthe

No.	Pos.	Nation	Player
-	MF	BRA	Diguinho
-	MF	BRA	Ton
-	MF	BRA	Michel Lorran
-	MF	BRA	Jackson Leylon
-	MF	BRA	Diogo
-	MF	BRA	Victor Feijão
-	MF	BRA	Rodrigo Marques
-	MF	BRA	Matheus Humberto
-	FW	BRA	Janderson
-	FW	BRA	Luís Gueguel
-	FW	BRA	Fred Saraiva
-	FW	BRA	Alex Alcântara
-	FW	BRA	Marlon
-	FW	BRA	Felipe Paulista
-	FW	BRA	Rafael Pilões

== Honours ==
=== Official tournaments ===
State
Competitions	Titles	Seasons
Campeonato Gaúcho	1	1933
Campeonato Gaúcho Série A2	2	1967, 1970

=== Others tournaments ===
==== State ====
- Copa ACEG (1): 1986
- Copa Bento Gonçalves (1): 1985
- Campeonato do Interior Gaúcho (1): 1933

==== City ====
- Campeonato Citadino de Rio Grande (31): 1916, 1918, 1920, 1923, 1927, 1928, 1929, 1930, 1931, 1932, 1933, 1935, 1943, 1945, 1952, 1954, 1958, 1959, 1966, 1967, 1968, 1969, 1970, 1971, 1972, 1973, 1980, 1987, 2004, 2009, 2020
- Taça Cidade do Rio Grande (1): 1980

=== Runners-up ===
- Campeonato Gaúcho Série A2 (1): 2013

== Derby ==
The derby between São Paulo and Rio Grande is known as Rio-Rita.
