= Estádio Olímpico Monumental =

Football stadium in Porto Alegre, Brazil

- Velho Casarão ("The Old Mansion")
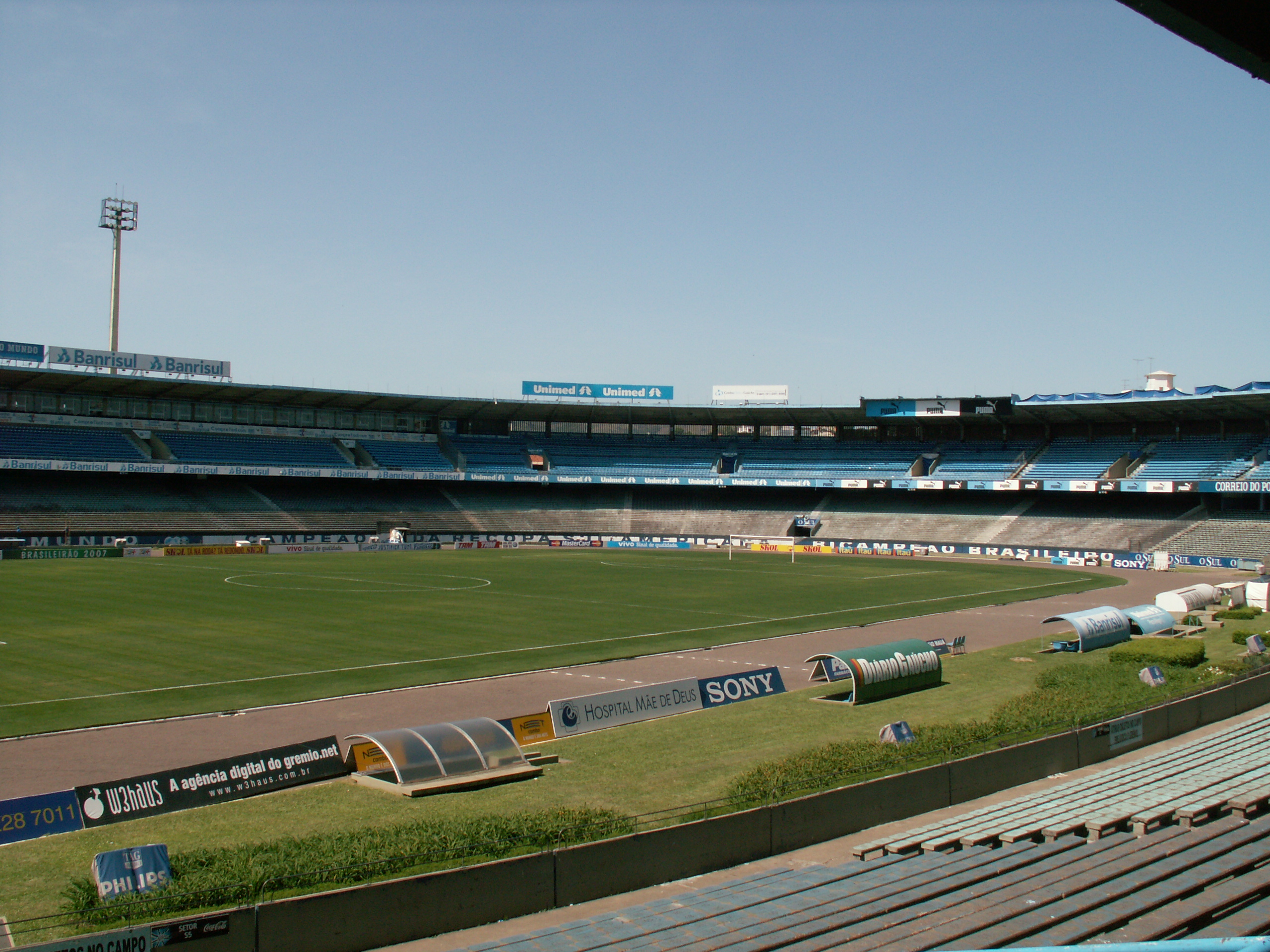
- Interactive map of Estádio Olímpico Monumental
- Former names: Estádio Olímpico
- Location: Porto Alegre, Brazil
- Coordinates: 30°3′37.79″S 51°12′48.94″W
- Owner: Grêmio Foot-Ball Porto Alegrense
- Operator: Grêmio Foot-Ball Porto Alegrense
- Capacity: 45,000 (originally 38,000)
- Executive suites: 45
- Surface: Bermuda Grass; American RayGrass
- Field size: 105 x 68 m

Construction
- Built: 1954
- Opened: September 19, 1954
- Renovated: 1980
- Closed: February 9, 2013
- Architect: Plínio Oliveira Almeida

Tenant
- Grêmio (1954–2012)

Website
- Official Website

Estádio Olímpico Monumental (Monumental Olympic Stadium), also known as Estádio Olímpico de Porto Alegre (Porto Alegre Olympic Stadium) and Estádio Olímpico (Olympic Stadium) until 1980, is a defunct football stadium in the city of Porto Alegre, in the Brazilian state of Rio Grande do Sul, with a capacity of 45,000 people. The stadium is owned by Grêmio Foot-Ball Porto Alegrense.

Opened on September 19, 1954, the stadium was the home field of Grêmio before the team moved to Arena do Grêmio in December 2012. Currently, the venue is not in use by the club and suffers from a lack of maintenance.

== History ==
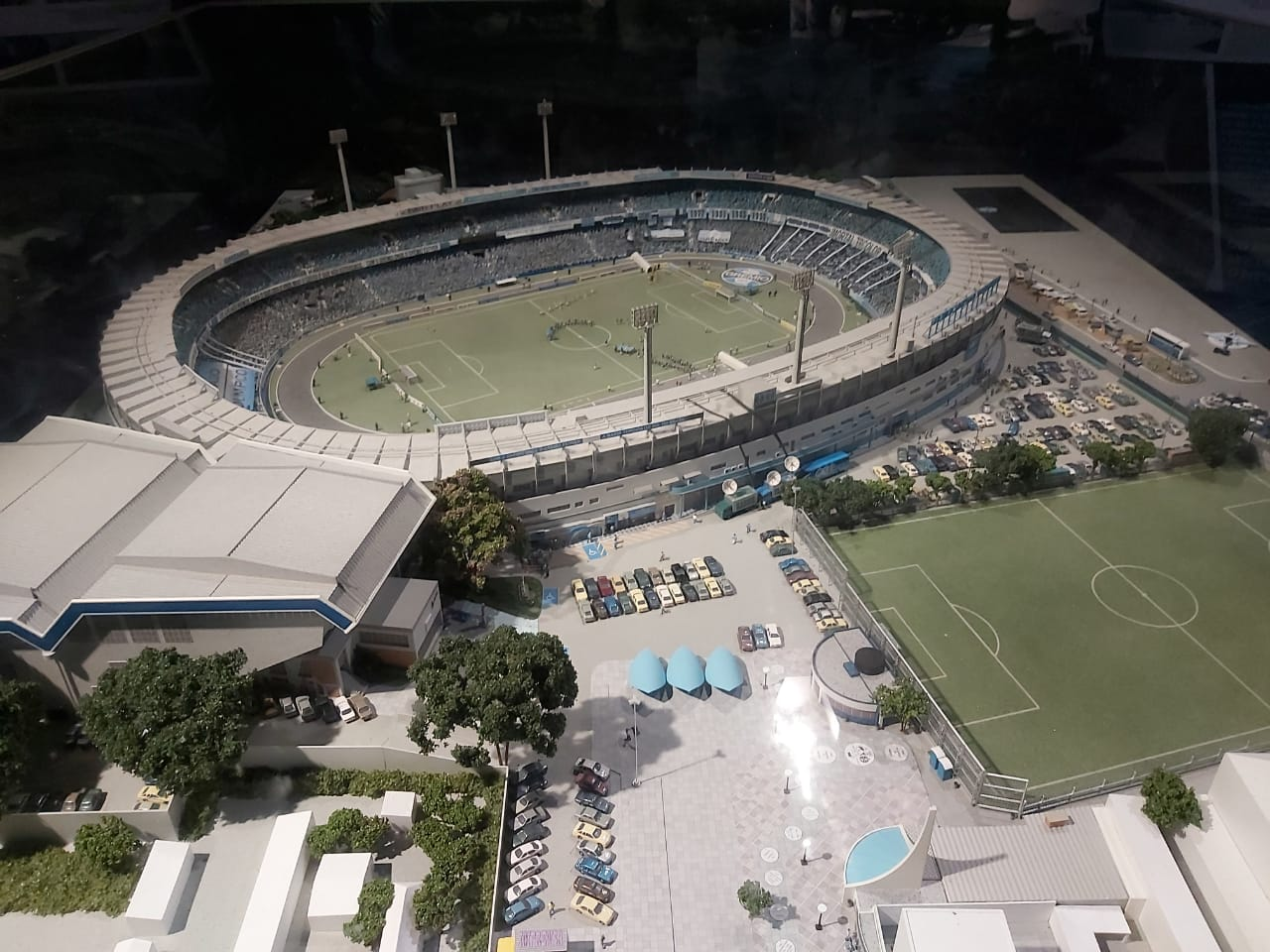
Model of the Olímpico Monumental

The stadium was inaugurated on September 19, 1954, with a maximum capacity of 38,000 people. In 1980, the stadium was expanded, and its capacity increased to 85,000 people. In 1990, the upper ring bleachers were numbered, and the Olímpico Monumental's capacity decreased to 51,081 people.

The inaugural match was played on September 19, 1954, when Grêmio beat Nacional of Uruguay 2–0. The first goal of the stadium was scored by Grêmio's player Vitor.

The stadium's attendance record currently stands at 85,721, set on April 26, 1981, when Ponte Preta beat Grêmio 1–0.

Grêmio won the Copa Libertadores at Estádio Olímpico Monumental on July 29, 1983, after defeating Peñarol from Uruguay in a difficult match.

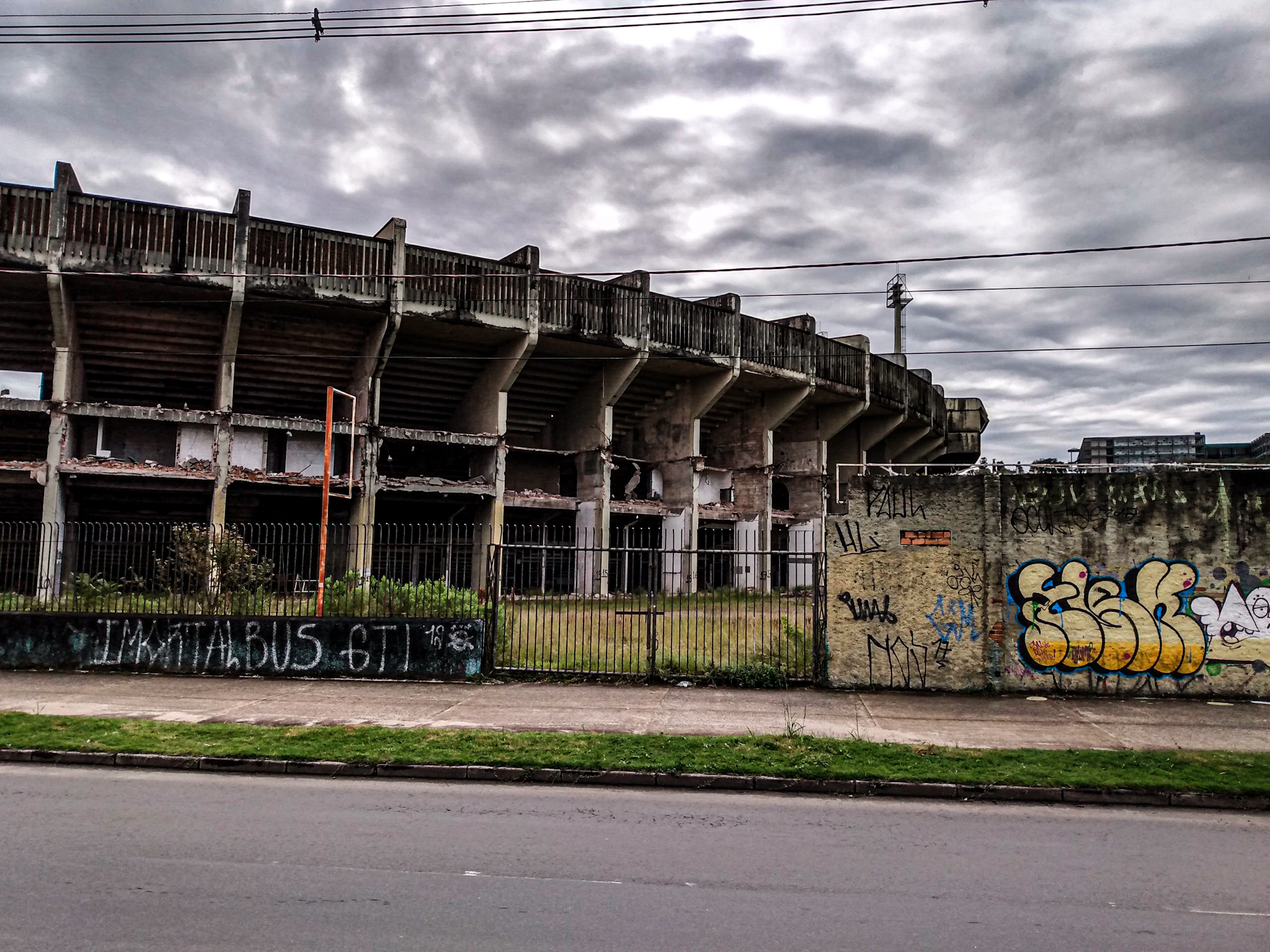
Abandoned Olímpico in 2019

Grêmio moved from the Estádio Olimpico Monumental to the new Arena do Grêmio on December 8, 2012.

== Other uses ==
The stadium was also used for large concerts. The first concert in the history of the stadium was the former member of the band The Police, the singer-songwriter Sting. For this concert, 60,000 people were at the stadium to cheer him, and it was one of the largest international shows to have taken place in the city of Porto Alegre. Two years later, it was time for Rod Stewart to perform at the stadium. Around 30,000 people attended the concert, this one with a less impressive number, considering that the singer performed in Florianópolis in the same week, emptying the show in Porto Alegre. In October 2001, the legend Eric Clapton performed for a fully packed stadium. In 2002, Roger Waters and the band Rush performed at sold-out stadium. The stadium has also hosted Lenny Kravitz´s concert in 2005, which was also a large audience.

The American singer Madonna performed a sold-out concert to 43.000 crowd at the stadium on December 9, 2012, as part of MDNA Tour, with this one being the last concert to take place at the stadium.

Events at Estádio Olímpico Monumental
Date	Event	Artist(s)	Attendance
2 December 1987	Nothing Like The Sun Tour	Sting	60,000
26 March 1989	Out of Order Tour	Rod Stewart	30,000
10 October 2001	Reptile World Tour	Eric Clapton	30,000
12 March 2002	In The Flesh Tour	Roger Waters	-
20 November 2002	Vapor Trails Tour	Rush	43,000
15 March 2005	Baptism Tour	Lenny Kravitz	20,000
9 December 2012	The MDNA Tour	Madonna	43,000
