= List of Grêmio FBPA players =

This is a list of the most notable footballers who had played for Grêmio FBPA.

== Players ==
Appearance and goal totals include matches in all competitions and friendly matches.

As of 2023 season

Name	Nationality	Position	Grêmio career	Appearances	Goals	Ref
Bruno Schuback	Germany	DF	1911–1915	55	3	
Gustav Mohrdieck	Germany	DF	1911–1920	90	24	
Augusto Sisson	Brazil	FW	1911; 1912–1916	66	57	
Jorge Py	Brazil	DF	1914–1925	143	9	
Oscar Gertum	Brazil	FW	1915–1921	80	55	
Lagarto	Brazil	FW	1917–1923	100	98	
Bruno Cossi	Brazil	FW	1918–1924	91	50	
Eurico Lara	Brazil	GK	1920–1927; 1929–1935	217	0	
Luiz Carvalho	Brazil	FW	1923–1928; 1929; 1938; 1939–1940	206	171	
Nenê	Brazil	FW	1924–1934	136	85	
Coró	Brazil	FW	1925–1934	111	71	
Foguinho	Brazil	MF	1928; 1930–1942	227	127	
Dario	Brazil	DF	1929–1942	230	2	
Lacy	Brazil	FW	1931–1940	116	47	
Alemãozinho	Brazil	FW	1932–1940	52	49	
Basílio	Brazil	FW	1938–1942	61	56	
Clarel	Brazil	DF	1939–1950; 1952–1953	251	2	
Esteban Sanguinetti	Uruguay	DF	1943–1947	102	8	
Danton	Brazil	MF	1944–1952	148	1	
Hugo	Brazil	DF	1945; 1949–1955	168	2	
Johnny	Brazil	DF	1946–1953	181	4	
Hermes	Brazil	FW	1947–1950	101	65	
Geada	Brazil	FW	1948–1952	158	93	
Sarará	Brazil	MF	1950; 1952–1955	206	24	
Orlando Rosa	Brazil	DF	1950–1953; 1958–1961	147	6	
Tesourinha	Brazil	FW	1952–1955	120	41	
Milton Kuelle	Brazil	MF	1952–1964	511	129	
Noronha	Brazil	DF	1953–1954	148	14	
Delém	Brazil	FW	1953–1958	101	52	
Ênio Rodrigues	Brazil	DF	1954–1961	315	4	
Airton Pavilhão	Brazil	DF	1954–1968	601	18	
Raul Calvet	Brazil	DF	1955–1956; 1959–1960	68	3	
Luis Figueiró	Brazil	DF	1955–1961; 1963	171	2	
Gessy	Brazil	FW	1955–1962	302	208	
Juarez	Brazil	FW	1955–1963	306	204	
Leôncio Vieira	Brazil	FW	1955–1968	560	106	
Élton	Brazil	MF	1956–1963	326	80	
Ortunho	Brazil	DF	1958–1967	417	6	
Renato	Brazil	DF	1959–1964; 1968–1970	149	11	
João Severiano	Brazil	MF	1960–1961; 1962–1972	423	135	
Marino	Brazil	FW	1960–1964	248	117	
Paulo Lumumba	Brazil	FW	1961–1968	146	55	
Altemir	Brazil	DF	1961–1970	317	10	
Áureo	Brazil	DF	1962–1971	344	10	
Cléo	Brazil	MF	1963–1970	300	7	
Arlindo	Brazil	GK	1963–1971	212	0	
Sérgio Lopes	Brazil	MF	1964–1970	314	54	
Alcindo	Brazil	FW	1964–1971; 1977–1978	378	229	
Volmir	Brazil	FW	1964–1971	277	64	
Everaldo	Brazil	DF	1964–1974	373	2	
Paulo Souza	Brazil	DF	1965–1970	129	0	
Ari Ercílio	Brazil	DF	1966–1971	198	1	
Babá	Brazil	FW	1967–1969	120	17	
Valdir Espinosa	Brazil	DF	1967–1973	214	1	
Loivo	Brazil	FW	1967–1975	427	77	
Jadir	Brazil	MF	1967–1972	239	9	
Flecha	Brazil	FW	1968–1972	216	48	
Beto Bacamarte	Brazil	DF	1970–1976	335	4	
Hélio Pires	Brazil	FW	1970–1976; 1977	111	26	
Atilio Ancheta	Uruguay	DF	1971–1980	428	26	
Yura	Brazil	MF	1971–1980	359	62	
Alfredo Obberti	Argentina	FW	1972–1973	103	35	
Carlos Alberto	Brazil	MF	1972–1974	121	1	
Jorge Tabajara	Brazil	DF	1972–1976	193	6	
Picasso	Brazil	GK	1973–1975	187	0	
Beto Fuscão	Brazil	DF	1973–1976	159	0	
Zequinha	Brazil	FW	1976–1977	191	24	
Remi	Brazil	GK	1974–1983	111	0	
Tarciso	Brazil	FW	1974–1985	723	226	
Neca	Brazil	MF	1975–1976	108	59	
Vilson Cereja	Brazil	DF	1975–1979	256	26	
Alcino	Brazil	FW	1976	48	28	
Víctor Hugo	Brazil	MF	1976–1980	285	3	
Eurico	Brazil	DF	1976–1980	195	11	
Oberdan	Brazil	DF	1977–1978	74	13	
André Catimba	Brazil	FW	1977–1979	133	65	
Ladinho	Brazil	DF	1977–1979	157	12	
Éder Aleixo	Brazil	FW	1977–1979	159	70	
Jorge Leandro	Brazil	MF	1977–1980; 1983–1984	207	5	
Vicente	Brazil	DF	1978–1981	148	1	
Paulo Roberto	Brazil	DF	1978–1983	131	3	
Jurandir	Brazil	MF	1978–1981	117	12	
Vantuir	Brazil	DF	1978–1982	207	5	
Paulo Bonamigo	Brazil	MF	1978–1989	489	44	
Paulo Cézar Caju	Brazil	FW	1979–1980; 1983	62	14	
Dirceu Mendes	Brazil	DF	1979–1982	178	3	
Baltazar	Brazil	FW	1979–1982	215	131	
Odair	Brazil	FW	1979–1987	203	26	
Jorge Baidek	Brazil	DF	1979–1987	287	2	
Émerson Leão	Brazil	GK	1980–1982	179	0	
Vilson Tadei	Brazil	MF	1980–1982	84	8	
Paulo Isidoro	Brazil	MF	1980–1983	173	49	
Newmar	Brazil	DF	1980–1984	127	13	
China	Brazil	MF	1980; 1981–1984; 1985–1987	381	28	
Casemiro Mior	Brazil	DF	1980–1987	378	5	
Renato Gaúcho	Brazil	FW	1980–1986; 1991; 1995	261	74	
Hugo de León	Uruguay	DF	1981–1984	242	11	
Tonho Gil	Brazil	MF	1981–1983	106	9	
Paulo César	Brazil	DF	1981–1984	158	3	
Osvaldo	Brazil	FW	1982–1987	265	105	
Tita	Brazil	MF	1983	32	19	
César	Brazil	FW	1983–1984	48	14	
Caio	Brazil	FW	1983–1984	75	19	
Caio Júnior	Brazil	FW	1983–1987	150	62	
Raul	Brazil	DF	1983–1987	190	14	
Valdo	Brazil	MF	1983–1988; 2002	270	41	
Luís Eduardo	Brazil	DF	1984–1990	408	22	
João Antônio	Brazil	MF	1984–1991; 1996–1997	210	6	
Darci	Brazil	MF	1985–1991	179	14	
Mazarópi	Brazil	GK	1985–1990	425	0	
Lima	Brazil	FW	1986–1988; 1992	142	65	
Danrlei	Brazil	GK	1987–2003	588	0	
Jorge Veras	Brazil	FW	1987–1988	107	13	
Cristóvão	Brazil	MF	1987–1989	125	21	
Alfinete	Brazil	DF	1987–1990; 1993	195	13	
Wolnei Caio	Brazil	MF	1987–1993	222	63	
Assis	Brazil	MF	1988–1992	134	25	
Cuca	Brazil	MF	1988–1990; 1992	182	66	
Vilson	Brazil	DF	1988–1993	151	9	
Edinho	Brazil	DF	1989	35	4	
Hélcio	Brazil	DF	1989–1991	107	0	
Paulo Egídio	Brazil	FW	1989–1991	109	30	
Jandir	Brazil	MF	1989–1992	160	7	
Jamir	Brazil	MF	1990–1991; 1992–1994	160	7	
Luciano Dias	Brazil	DF	1990–1997	282	9	
Carlinhos	Brazil	FW	1992–1994	117	30	
Wagner Fernandes	Brazil	DF	1992; 1995–1997	100	3	
Carlos Miguel	Brazil	MF	1992–1997; 2003	328	52	
Pingo	Brazil	MF	1993–1994	136	5	
Arílson	Brazil	MF	1993–1995; 1999; 2004	158	11	
Roger	Brazil	MF	1994–2003	500	7	
Emerson	Brazil	MF	1994–1997	160	25	
Nildo	Brazil	MF	1994–1996	61	23	
Rodrigo Gral	Brazil	FW	1994–2002	127	13	
Murilo Engelmann	Brazil	GK	1994–2000	117	0	
Rafael Scheidt	Brazil	DF	1994–1999	156	12	
Adilson	Brazil	DF	1995–1996	113	13	
Francisco Arce	Paraguay	DF	1995–1997	145	13	
Mário Jardel	Brazil	FW	1995–1996	84	64	
Paulo Nunes	Brazil	FW	1995–1997; 2000	197	69	
Dinho	Brazil	MF	1995–1997	149	25	
Luís Carlos Goiano	Brazil	MF	1995–1999	287	30	
Catalino Rivarola	Paraguay	DF	1995–1998	173	6	
Mauro Galvão	Brazil	DF	1996–1997	126	5	
Zé Alcino	Brazil	FW	1996–1999	185	48	
Rodrigo Mendes	Brazil	FW	1996; 1998; 2000–2002; 2008	171	49	
Ronaldinho	Brazil	FW	1997–2001	139	68	
Tinga	Brazil	MF	1997–2003	217	16	
Itaqui	Brazil	DF	1998–2001	189	15	
Carlos Gavião	Brazil	MF	1998–2003	192	1	
Cláudio Pitbull	Brazil	FW	1999–2004	130	32	
Ânderson Polga	Brazil	DF	1999–2003	170	9	
Eduardo Costa	Brazil	MF	2000–2001; 2007–2008	106	3	
Patrício	Brazil	DF	2000–2001; 2005–2007	149	8	
Zinho	Brazil	MF	2000–2002	158	45	
Ânderson Lima	Brazil	DF	2000–2003	191	36	
Claudiomiro	Brazil	DF	2001–2004	139	8	
Felipe Baloy	Panama	DF	2003–2004	63	2	
Rodrigo Galatto	Brazil	GK	2004–2007	73	0	
Marcelo Grohe	Brazil	GK	2005–2018	408	0	
Lucas Leiva	Brazil	MF	2005–2007; 2022–2023	97	14	
Sandro Goiano	Brazil	MF	2005–2007	105	2	
Germán Herrera	Argentina	FW	2006; 2009	84	20	
Tcheco	Brazil	MF	2006–2007; 2008–2009	181	43	
Diego Souza	Brazil	FW	2007; 2020–2023	222	87	
Sebastián Saja	Argentina	GK	2007	59	1	
Adílson	Brazil	MF	2007–2011	183	2	
Jonas	Brazil	FW	2007–2011	148	78	
Souza	Brazil	MF	2008–2010	97	25	
Victor	Brazil	GK	2008–2012	263	0	
Fábio Rochemback	Brazil	MF	2009–2011	113	6	
Rafael Marques	Brazil	DF	2009–2011	154	18	
Fernando	Brazil	MF	2009–2013	144	11	
Douglas	Brazil	MF	2010–2012; 2015–2018	253	45	
André Lima	Brazil	FW	2010–2013	119	39	
Souza	Brazil	MF	2012–2013	119	3	
Pará	Brazil	DF	2012–2015	173	1	
Zé Roberto	Brazil	MF	2012–2014	122	15	
Werley	Brazil	DF	2012–2016	131	15	
Hernán Barcos	Argentina	FW	2013–2015	116	45	
Bressan	Brazil	DF	2013–2018	161	5	
Ramiro	Brazil	MF	2013–2018	255	23	
Pedro Rocha	Brazil	FW	2015–2017	126	32	
Fernandinho	Brazil	FW	2014–2017	105	14	
Luan	Brazil	FW	2014–2019; 2023	298	77	
Everton Soares	Brazil	FW	2014–2020	277	70	
Pedro Geromel	Brazil	DF	2014–	396	15	
Arthur	Brazil	MF	2015–2018	70	6	
Jailson	Brazil	MF	2015–2018; 2020–2021	114	4	
Marcelo Oliveira	Brazil	DF	2015–2020	174	6	
Walter Kannemann	Argentina	DF	2016–	295	5	
Maicon	Brazil	MF	2016–2021	248	15	
Ferreirinha	Brazil	FW	2016–2024	152	27	
Léo Moura	Brazil	DF	2017–2019	100	5	
Pepê	Brazil	FW	2017–2021	144	32	
Michel	Brazil	MF	2017–2022	114	8	
Matheus Henrique	Brazil	MF	2017–2022	139	11	
Jean Pyerre	Brazil	MF	2017–2022	141	22	
Alisson	Brazil	MF	2018–2021	185	23	
Bruno Cortez	Brazil	DF	2018–2021	228	2	
Lucas Silva	Brazil	MF	2020–2023	150	5	
Luis Suárez	Uruguay	FW	2023	54	29	
