= Tadeu Ricci =

Brazilian footballer (born 1947)

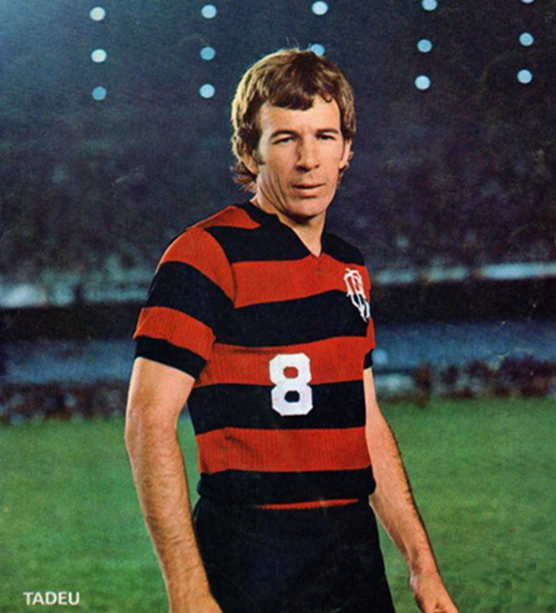
- Ricci in 1976

Personal information
- Full name: Mário Tadeu Ricci
- Date of birth: 9 April 1947 (age 79)
- Place of birth: Ribeirão Preto, São Paulo, Brazil
- Height: 1.81 m (5 ft 11 in)
- Position: Midfielder

Youth career
- Comercial

Senior career*
Years	Team	Apps	(Gls)
1966–1968	Comercial		
1968	→ Batatais (loan)		
1969–1974	America–RJ		
1975–1976	Flamengo	101	(14)
1977–1978	Grêmio		
1979–1984	Comercial		
- * Club domestic league appearances and goals

Mário Tadeu Ricci (born 9 April 1947), more commonly known as Tadeu Ricci, is a Brazilian retired footballer. He played as midfielder for various clubs throughout the late 1960s to the early 1980s. He is mostly associated with his tenures with Comercial, America–RJ and Flamengo.

== Club career ==
Tadeu Ricci was born on 9 April 1947 in Ribeirão Preto as the son of Mário Ricci who would serve as the president of Comercial in two terms throughout the 1960s. He began his football career by playing for local clubs within his hometown of Ribeirão Preto until he was admitted into the youth sector of Comercial and climbed the ranks to making the starting XI of the club until he made his professional senior debut in 1966 and would continue for around a year until he was loaned out to Batatais in 1968 and America–RJ in 1969 before being fully incorporated to the latter for subsequent years until 1974 as he would satisfy club manager Evaristo de Macedo and enjoying consistent participation and winning the 1967 Taça Guanabara.

He would then play for Flamengo in 1975 following a deteriorating relationship with America–RJ with his debut being a 2–1 victory against Internacional in 28 September. He would remain with the club for two seasons with his final match being a 1–1 tie against Desportiva Ferroviária on 6 December 1976. Beginning in 1977, Tadeu Ricci would play for Grêmio as a part of a project by manager Telê Santana to end the regional dominance of Internacional with his first match with being a 3–0 win against the club on 17 April. Telê described Tadeu Ricci as being one of the most disciplined players of his team, going as far to use him as a positive example of a model player as he would play alongside Walter Corbo, Eurico, Oberdan Vilaín, Atilio Ancheta, Ladinho, Víctor Hugo Barros, Yura, Tarciso, André Catimba and Éder Aleixo. He would later be a part of the squad that won the 1977 Campeonato Gaúcho with an unexpected retirement from the club in 1978 following a 1–2 loss to Internacional. Following a brief consideration of retirement, Comercial would sign a new contract with him for the 1979 Campeonato Brasileiro Série A and would play for the club until his retirement in 1984.
