= 1982 Campeonato Gaúcho =

Campeonato Gaúcho
- Season: 1982
- Champions: Internacional
- Relegated: Guarany de Bagé; São José
- Taça de Ouro: Grêmio; Internacional
- Taça de Prata: Novo Hamburgo; Esportivo
- Matches: 162
- Goals: 324 (2 per match)
- Top goalscorer: Geraldão (Internacional) – 20 goals
- Biggest home win: Grêmio 7-0 São Paulo (October 31, 1982)
- Biggest away win: Guarany de Bagé 0-4 Grêmio (July 21, 1982); Juventude 0-4 Novo Hamburgo (July 31, 1982)
- Highest scoring: Internacional 6-1 Juventude (July 31, 1982); Grêmio 7-0 São Paulo (October 31, 1982)

The 62nd season of the Campeonato Gaúcho kicked off on July 20, 1982, and ended on November 28, 1982. Twelve teams participated. Internacional won their 27th title. Guarany de Bagé and São José were relegated.

== Participating teams ==
Club	Stadium	Home location	Previous season
Brasil	Bento Freitas	Pelotas	8th
Caxias	Centenário	Caxias do Sul	6th
Esportivo	Montanha	Bento Gonçalves	2nd (Second level)
Grêmio	Olímpico	Porto Alegre	2nd
Guarany	Estrela D'Alva	Bagé	9th
Internacional	Beira-Rio	Porto Alegre	1st
Internacional	Presidente Vargas	Santa Maria	3rd
Juventude	Alfredo Jaconi	Caxias do Sul	11th
Novo Hamburgo	Santa Rosa	Novo Hamburgo	4th
São Borja	Vicente Goulart	São Borja	7th
São José	Passo d'Areia	Porto Alegre	1st (Second level)
São Paulo	Aldo Dapuzzo	Rio Grande	5th

== System ==
The championship would have two stages.:

- First phase: The twelve clubs played each other in a double round-robin system. The six best teams qualified to the Final phase, with the best teams and the best hinterland teams in each round earning one bonus point. the bottom two teams in the sum of both rounds were relegated.
- Final phase: The six remaining teams played each other in a double round-robin system; the team with the most points won the title.

== Championship ==
=== First phase ===
==== First round ====
Pos	Team	Pld	W	D	L	GF	GA	GD	Pts	Qualification or relegation
1	Internacional	11	9	1	1	24	5	+19	19	Qualified;One extra point
2	Grêmio	11	9	1	1	20	4	+16	19	
3	Internacional de Santa Maria	11	6	2	3	15	7	+8	14	Qualified;One extra point
4	São Borja	11	4	4	3	13	12	+1	12	
5	Novo Hamburgo	11	4	3	4	13	9	+4	11	
6	Esportivo	11	4	1	6	12	13	−1	9	
7	São Paulo	11	3	3	5	9	9	0	9	
8	São José	11	2	4	5	7	14	−7	8	
9	Juventude	11	2	4	5	6	17	−11	8	
10	Guarany de Bagé	11	2	4	5	4	19	−15	8	
11	Caxias	11	1	6	4	2	6	−4	8	
12	Brasil de Pelotas	11	1	5	5	5	15	−10	7	

Updated to match(es) played on September 4, 1982. Source: RSSSF.com
Rules for classification: 1) points; 2) wins; 3) goal difference; 4) number of goals scored.

== Results ==
Home/Away	BRA	CAX	ESP	GRE	GUA	INT	INT-SM	JUV	NHA	SBO	SJO	SPA
Brasil de Pelotas			0-0		0-0		0-3		0-3			1-1
Caxias	1-1	0-0	—	—	0-0	0-1	—	—	—	—	—	1-0
Esportivo	—	2-0	—	—	4-0	0-1		0-1			2-0	1-0
Grêmio	3-0	1-0	3-0	—	—	2-0	—	2-0	—	—	—	—
Guarany de Bagé	—	—	—	0-4	—	—	0-2	—	1-0	—	2-1	0-3
Internacional	2-0	—	—	—	4-0	—	2-2	—	—	3-2	4-0	—
Internacional de Santa María	—	—	2-1	0-1	—	—	—	0-0	2-0	0-1	—	—
Juventude	1-0	0-0							0-4	3-2	0-0	0-0
Novo Hamburgo		1-0	2-0	0-1		0-2					1-1	
São Borja	0-2	0-0	4-1	1-1	0-0							
São José	1-1			2-0	0-0		0-2		1-1	2-0		
São Paulo				0-2		0-1	2-1		1-1	0-1	2-0	

=== Second round ===
Pos	Team	Pld	W	D	L	GF	GA	GD	Pts	Qualification or relegation
1	Grêmio	11	7	3	1	16	6	+10	17	Qualified;One extra point
2	Esportivo	11	7	2	2	14	7	+7	16	Qualified;One extra point
3	Caxias	11	5	4	2	12	7	+5	14	
4	São Paulo	11	5	3	3	8	7	+1	13	
5	Internacional	11	4	5	2	19	10	+9	13	
6	Novo Hamburgo	11	3	5	3	12	13	−1	11	
7	Brasil de Pelotas	11	3	4	4	8	8	0	10	
8	Juventude	11	3	4	4	8	10	−2	10	
9	Internacional de Santa Maria	11	3	3	5	12	14	−2	9	
10	São Borja	11	3	3	5	7	13	−6	9	
11	São José	11	2	3	6	5	15	−10	7	
12	Guarany de Bagé	11	0	3	8	4	18	−14	3	

Updated to match(es) played on October 17, 1982. Source: RSSSF.com
Rules for classification: 1) points; 2) wins; 3) goal difference; 4) number of goals scored.

== Results ==
Home/Away	BRA	CAX	ESP	GRE	GUA	INT	INT-SM	JUV	NHA	SBO	SJO	SPA
Brasil de Pelotas												
Caxias												
Esportivo												
Grêmio												
Guarany de Bagé												
Internacional												
Internacional de Santa María												
Juventude												
Novo Hamburgo												
São Borja												
São José												
São Paulo												

=== Final standings ===
Pos	Team	Pld	W	D	L	GF	GA	GD	Pts	Qualification or relegation
1	Grêmio	22	16	4	2	36	10	+26	36	Qualified
2	Internacional	22	13	6	3	43	15	+28	32	Qualified
3	Esportivo	22	11	3	8	26	20	+6	25	Qualified
4	Internacional de Santa Maria	22	9	5	8	27	21	+6	23	Qualified
5	São Paulo	22	8	6	8	17	16	+1	22	Qualified
6	Novo Hamburgo	22	7	8	7	25	22	+3	22	Qualified
7	Caxias	22	6	10	6	14	13	+1	22	
8	São Borja	22	7	7	8	20	25	−5	21	
9	Juventude	22	5	8	9	14	27	−13	18	
10	Brasil de Pelotas	22	4	9	9	13	23	−10	17	
11	São José	22	4	7	11	12	29	−17	15	Relegated
12	Guarany de Bagé	22	2	7	13	8	37	−29	11	Relegated

Updated to match(es) played on October 17, 1982. Source: RSSSF.com
Rules for classification: 1) points; 2) wins; 3) goal difference; 4) number of goals scored.

=== Final phase ===
Pos	Team	Pld	W	D	L	GF	GA	GD	Pts	Qualification or relegation
1	Internacional	10	8	2	0	18	4	+14	19	Champions;1983 Taça de Ouro
2	Grêmio	10	7	1	2	18	6	+12	16	1983 Taça de Ouro
3	Esportivo	10	3	5	2	10	9	+1	12	1983 Taça de Prata
4	Novo Hamburgo	10	2	4	4	11	11	0	8	1983 Taça de Prata
5	São Paulo	10	1	3	6	6	21	−15	5	
6	Internacional de Santa Maria	10	0	3	7	6	18	−12	4	

Updated to match(es) played on November 28, 1982. Source: RSSSF.com
Rules for classification: 1) points; 2) wins; 3) goal difference; 4) number of goals scored.
