= Odair Mocellin =

Brazilian footballer

Odair
Personal information
- Full name: Odair Francisco Mocellin
- Date of birth: 10 June 1961 (age 65)
- Place of birth: Aratiba, Brazil
- Position: Left winger

Senior career*
Years	Team	Apps	(Gls)
1979–1987	Grêmio	203	(26)
1987	Inter de Limeira		
1988	Vitória		
1989	Novo Hamburgo		

International career
1981	Brazil U20		
- * Club domestic league appearances and goals as of 17 May 2024

Odair Francisco Mocellin (born 10 June 1961), simply known as Odair, is a Brazilian former professional footballer who played as a left winger.

== Career ==
Revealed in Grêmio's youth categories, Odair stood out for the club in the 80s, especially in winning the Brazilian title in 1981. He also played for Inter de Limeira, Vitória and Novo Hamburgo. In 1981, he also played for the Brazil under-20 team, winning the Toulon Tournament.

Currently, Odair has a football school in the city of Erechim.

== Honours ==
Grêmio

- Campeonato Brasileiro: 1981
- Campeonato Gaúcho: 1979, 1980, 1985, 1986, 1987

Inter de Limeira

- Taça dos Campeões Estaduais Rio-São Paulo: 1986

Brazil U20

- Toulon Tournament: 1981
