= Vicente (footballer, born 1949) =

Brazilian footballer

Personal information
- Full name: Vicente Gonçalves de Paula
- Date of birth: 5 July 1949
- Place of birth: Bagé, Brazil
- Date of death: 24 December 2011 (aged 62)
- Place of death: Porto Alegre, Brazil
- Height: 1.78 m (5 ft 10 in)
- Position: Centre-back

Senior career*
Years	Team	Apps	(Gls)
1970	Guarany de Bagé		
1971–1975	Santos		
1976	Coritiba		
1977–1981	Grêmio	147	(7)
1982	Caxias		
1983	São José-RS		

Managerial career
- 1984: Bagé
- 1987: Bagé
- 1993: Bagé
- * Club domestic league appearances and goals as of 20 May 2024

Vicente Gonçalves de Paula (5 July 1949 – 24 December 2011), simply known as Vicente, was a Brazilian professional footballer and manager, who played as a centre-back.

== Career ==
Vicente began his professional career at Guarany de Bagé. In 1971 he was appointed by Raul Calvet to Santos, where he was state champion in 1973, playing alongside fellow countryman Oberdan. He also had a successful spell at Grêmio, where he was part of the Brazilian champion squad in 1981.

== Managerial career ==
As manager, Vicente led GE Bagé on three occasions, gaining access to the first division of Rio Grande do Sul in 1993.

== Honours ==
Santos

- Campeonato Paulista: 1973

Coritiba

- Campeonato Paranaense: 1976

Grêmio

- Campeonato Brasileiro: 1981
- Campeonato Gaúcho: 1979, 1980

== Death ==
Vicente died of cancer at the age of 62, on 24 December 2024.
