= Raul (footballer, born 1964) =

Brazilian footballer

Personal information
- Full name: Raul Mendes da Rocha
- Date of birth: 10 October 1964 (age 62)
- Place of birth: Dom Pedrito, Brazil
- Position: Right back

Youth career
- –1983: Grêmio

Senior career*
Years	Team	Apps	(Gls)
1983–1987	Grêmio	190	(14)
1987–1988	Santos		
1989–1990	Joinville		
1992	Guarany (CA)		
1994	Aimoré		
- * Club domestic league appearances and goals as of 16 May 2024

Raul Mendes da Rocha (born 10 October 1964) is a Brazilian former professional footballer who played as a right back.

== Career ==
Right back, Raul was trained in Grêmio's youth sectors, and with the club he was state champion three times, in addition to making 190 appearances. He also played for Santos, Joinville, SC Guarany de Aimoré.

== Personal life ==
Raul was president of the Clube do Grêmio Náutico Gaúcho, and in 2016, he ran for president of Grêmio FBPA as opposition to Romildo Bolzan Júnior.

== Honours ==
Grêmio

- Campeonato Gaúcho: 1985, 1986, 1987
