= 1986 Campeonato Gaúcho =

Campeonato Gaúcho
- Season: 1986
- Champions: Grêmio
- Relegated: Aimoré; Grêmio Bagé
- Parallel Tournament: Brasil de Pelotas; Juventude; Novo Hamburgo
- Matches played: 194
- Goals scored: 419 (2.16 per match)
- Top goalscorer: Balalo (Internacional) – 14 goals
- Biggest home win: Grêmio 7–0 Novo Hamburgo (July 6, 1986)
- Biggest away win: Brasil de Pelotas 1–5 Internacional (March 19, 1986); Pelotas 0–4 Internacional (March 26, 1986); Esportivo 0–4 Grêmio (April 20, 1986)
- Highest scoring: Internacional 5–3 Caxias (April 16, 1986)

The 66th season of the Campeonato Gaúcho kicked off on February 16, 1986, and ended on July 20, 1986. Fourteen teams participated. Grêmio won their 24th title. Aimoré and Grêmio Bagé were relegated.

== Participating teams ==
| Club | Stadium | Home location | Previous season |
|---|---|---|---|
| Aimoré | Cristo-Rei | São Leopoldo | 11th |
| Brasil | Bento Freitas | Pelotas | 8th |
| Caxias | Centenário | Caxias do Sul | 4th |
| Esportivo | Montanha | Bento Gonçalves | 10th |
| Grêmio | Pedra Moura | Bagé | 1st (Second level) |
| Grêmio | Olímpico | Porto Alegre | 1st |
| Internacional | Beira-Rio | Porto Alegre | 2nd |
| Internacional | Presidente Vargas | Santa Maria | 6th |
| Juventude | Alfredo Jaconi | Caxias do Sul | 5th |
| Novo Hamburgo | Santa Rosa | Novo Hamburgo | 3rd |
| Pelotas | Boca do Lobo | Pelotas | 9th |
| São Borja | Vicente Goulart | São Borja | 12th |
| São Paulo | Aldo Dapuzzo | Rio Grande | 2nd (Second level) |
| Santa Cruz | Plátanos | Santa Cruz do Sul | 7th |

== System ==
The championship would have two stages.:

- First phase: The fourteen clubs played each other in a double round-robin system. The four best teams in the sum of both rounds qualified into the Final phase, with the winners of each round earning one bonus point, and the two teams with the fewest points were relegated.
- Final phase: The four remaining teams played each other in a double round-robin system; the team with the most points won the title.

== Championship ==
=== First phase ===
==== First round ====
| Pos | Team | Pld | W | D | L | GF | GA | GD | Pts | Qualification or relegation |
|---|---|---|---|---|---|---|---|---|---|---|
| 1 | Grêmio | 13 | 10 | 2 | 1 | 28 | 10 | +18 | 22 | Qualified to Final phase |
| 2 | Internacional | 13 | 7 | 4 | 2 | 19 | 7 | +12 | 18 | |
| 3 | Novo Hamburgo | 13 | 5 | 6 | 2 | 16 | 13 | +3 | 16 | |
| 4 | Internacional de Santa Maria | 13 | 4 | 7 | 2 | 14 | 11 | +3 | 15 | |
| 5 | Juventude | 13 | 5 | 4 | 4 | 10 | 8 | +2 | 14 | |
| 6 | Esportivo | 13 | 4 | 6 | 3 | 13 | 10 | +3 | 14 | |
| 7 | Santa Cruz | 13 | 3 | 8 | 2 | 12 | 16 | −4 | 14 | |
| 8 | Caxias | 13 | 3 | 8 | 2 | 16 | 15 | +1 | 14 | |
| 9 | São Borja | 13 | 4 | 3 | 6 | 10 | 18 | −8 | 11 | |
| 10 | Pelotas | 13 | 2 | 7 | 4 | 10 | 14 | −4 | 11 | |
| 11 | São Paulo | 13 | 2 | 6 | 5 | 7 | 13 | −6 | 10 | |
| 12 | Aimoré | 13 | 3 | 3 | 7 | 8 | 12 | −4 | 9 | |
| 13 | Brasil de Pelotas | 13 | 1 | 6 | 6 | 6 | 15 | −9 | 8 | |
| 14 | Grêmio Bagé | 13 | 0 | 6 | 7 | 6 | 19 | −13 | 6 | |

Updated to match(es) played on April 6, 1986. Source: RSSSF.com
Rules for classification: 1) points; 2) wins; 3) goal difference; 4) number of goals scored.

==== Second round ====
| Pos | Team | Pld | W | D | L | GF | GA | GD | Pts | Qualification or relegation |
|---|---|---|---|---|---|---|---|---|---|---|
| 1 | Internacional | 13 | 11 | 2 | 0 | 34 | 9 | +25 | 24 | Qualified to Final phase |
| 2 | Grêmio | 13 | 9 | 1 | 3 | 34 | 13 | +21 | 19 | |
| 3 | Novo Hamburgo | 13 | 7 | 3 | 3 | 20 | 13 | +7 | 17 | |
| 4 | Brasil de Pelotas | 13 | 6 | 4 | 3 | 16 | 11 | +5 | 16 | |
| 5 | Juventude | 13 | 5 | 4 | 4 | 13 | 9 | +4 | 14 | |
| 6 | São Paulo | 13 | 4 | 5 | 4 | 14 | 15 | −1 | 13 | |
| 7 | São Borja | 13 | 4 | 4 | 5 | 12 | 13 | −1 | 12 | |
| 8 | Caxias | 13 | 3 | 6 | 4 | 16 | 19 | −3 | 12 | |
| 9 | Santa Cruz | 13 | 4 | 3 | 6 | 7 | 12 | −5 | 11 | |
| 10 | Pelotas | 13 | 3 | 5 | 5 | 11 | 22 | −11 | 11 | |
| 11 | Internacional de Santa Maria | 13 | 2 | 6 | 5 | 12 | 17 | −5 | 10 | |
| 12 | Aimoré | 13 | 2 | 6 | 5 | 8 | 13 | −5 | 10 | |
| 13 | Esportivo | 13 | 3 | 3 | 7 | 12 | 26 | −14 | 9 | |
| 14 | Grêmio Bagé | 13 | 1 | 2 | 10 | 6 | 29 | −23 | 4 | |

Updated to match(es) played on May 25, 1986. Source: RSSSF.com
Rules for classification: 1) points; 2) wins; 3) goal difference; 4) number of goals scored.

==== Final standings ====
| Pos | Team | Pld | W | D | L | GF | GA | GD | Pts | Qualification or relegation |
|---|---|---|---|---|---|---|---|---|---|---|
| 1 | Internacional | 26 | 18 | 6 | 2 | 53 | 16 | +37 | 42 | Qualified |
| 2 | Grêmio | 26 | 19 | 3 | 4 | 62 | 23 | +39 | 41 | Qualified |
| 3 | Novo Hamburgo | 26 | 12 | 9 | 5 | 36 | 26 | +10 | 33 | Qualified |
| 4 | Juventude | 26 | 10 | 8 | 8 | 23 | 17 | +6 | 28 | Qualified |
| 5 | Caxias | 26 | 6 | 14 | 6 | 32 | 34 | −2 | 26 | |
| 6 | Santa Cruz | 26 | 7 | 11 | 8 | 19 | 28 | −9 | 25 | |
| 7 | Internacional de Santa Maria | 26 | 6 | 13 | 7 | 26 | 28 | −2 | 25 | |
| 8 | Brasil de Pelotas | 26 | 7 | 10 | 9 | 22 | 26 | −4 | 24 | |
| 9 | São Borja | 26 | 8 | 7 | 11 | 22 | 31 | −9 | 23 | |
| 10 | Esportivo | 26 | 7 | 9 | 10 | 25 | 36 | −11 | 23 | |
| 11 | São Paulo | 26 | 6 | 11 | 9 | 21 | 28 | −7 | 23 | |
| 12 | Pelotas | 26 | 5 | 12 | 9 | 21 | 36 | −15 | 22 | |
| 13 | Aimoré | 26 | 5 | 9 | 12 | 16 | 25 | −9 | 19 | Relegated |
| 14 | Grêmio Bagé | 26 | 1 | 8 | 17 | 12 | 48 | −36 | 10 | Relegated |

Updated to match(es) played on May 25, 1986. Source: RSSSF.com
Rules for classification: 1) points; 2) wins; 3) goal difference; 4) number of goals scored.

=== Final phase ===
| Pos | Team | Pld | W | D | L | GF | GA | GD | Pts | Qualification or relegation |
|---|---|---|---|---|---|---|---|---|---|---|
| 1 | Grêmio | 6 | 4 | 2 | 0 | 17 | 3 | +14 | 11 | Champions |
| 2 | Internacional | 6 | 2 | 3 | 1 | 8 | 4 | +4 | 8 | |
| 3 | Juventude | 6 | 2 | 1 | 3 | 3 | 8 | −5 | 5 | |
| 4 | Novo Hamburgo | 6 | 0 | 2 | 4 | 1 | 14 | −13 | 2 | |

Updated to match(es) played on July 20, 1986. Source: RSSSF.com
Rules for classification: 1) points; 2) wins; 3) goal difference; 4) number of goals scored.
