= 1985 Campeonato Gaúcho =

Campeonato Gaúcho
- Season: 1985
- Champions: Grêmio
- Relegated: Gaúcho; Rio-Grandense
- Copa Brasil: Grêmio; Internacional
- Matches played: 182
- Goals scored: 364 (2 per match)
- Top goalscorer: Kita (Internacional); Caio Júnior (Grêmio) – 15 goals
- Biggest home win: Internacional 5-0 Aimoré (November 6, 1985); Grêmio 5-0 Pelotas (November 17, 1985); Grêmio 5-0 Rio-Grandense (November 20, 1985)
- Biggest away win: Gaúcho 0-4 Rio-Grandense (September 22, 1985); Gaúcho 0-4 Grêmio (November 13, 1985)
- Highest scoring: Brasil de Pelotas 3-5 Caxias (September 29, 1985)

The 65th season of the Campeonato Gaúcho kicked off on August 4, 1985 and ended in December 8, 1985. Fourteen teams participated. Grêmio won their 23rd title. Gaúcho and Rio-Grandense were relegated.

== Participating teams ==
Club	Stadium	Home location	Previous season
Aimoré	Cristo-Rei	São Leopoldo	9th
Brasil	Bento Freitas	Pelotas	3rd
Caxias	Centenário	Caxias do Sul	12th
Esportivo	Montanha	Bento Gonçalves	7th
Gaúcho	Wolmar Salton	Passo Fundo	1st (Second level)
Grêmio	Olímpico	Porto Alegre	2nd
Internacional	Beira-Rio	Porto Alegre	1st
Internacional	Presidente Vargas	Santa Maria	8th
Juventude	Alfredo Jaconi	Caxias do Sul	5th
Novo Hamburgo	Santa Rosa	Novo Hamburgo	4th
Pelotas	Boca do Lobo	Pelotas	6th
Rio-Grandense	Torquato Pontes	Rio Grande	2nd (Second level)
São Borja	Vicente Goulart	São Borja	10th
Santa Cruz	Plátanos	Santa Cruz do Sul	11th

== System ==
The championship would have three stages.:

- First round: The fourteen clubs played each other in a single round-robin system. The team with the most points qualified to the Finals.
- Second round: The fourteen clubs played each other in a single round-robin system. The team with the most points qualified to the Finals. The two teams with the fewest points in the sum of both rounds were relegated.
- Finals: The round winners would play to define the champions. If the same team won both rounds it won the title automatically.

== Championship ==
=== First phase ===
==== First round ====
Pos	Team	Pld	W	D	L	GF	GA	GD	Pts	Qualification or relegation
1	Grêmio	13	10	2	1	23	9	+14	22	Qualified to Finals
2	Internacional	13	9	3	1	22	9	+13	21	
3	Novo Hamburgo	13	6	5	2	20	12	+8	17	
4	Internacional de Santa Maria	13	4	7	2	10	9	+1	15	
5	Pelotas	13	5	4	4	14	14	0	14	
6	Caxias	13	4	5	4	12	13	−1	13	
7	Esportivo	13	3	7	3	6	10	−4	13	
8	Brasil de Pelotas	13	4	4	5	10	13	−3	12	
9	Juventude	13	4	3	6	11	13	−2	11	
10	Santa Cruz	13	3	5	5	9	12	−3	11	
11	Aimoré	13	3	3	7	10	14	−4	9	
12	São Borja	13	2	5	6	7	12	−5	9	
13	Gaúcho	13	3	2	8	10	19	−9	8	
14	Rio-Grandense	13	1	5	7	10	18	−8	7	

Updated to match(es) played on October 20, 1985. Source: RSSSF.com
Rules for classification: 1) points; 2) wins; 3) goal difference; 4) number of goals scored.

==== Second round ====
Pos	Team	Pld	W	D	L	GF	GA	GD	Pts	Qualification or relegation
1	Grêmio	13	8	3	2	33	8	+25	19	Qualified to Finals
2	Internacional	13	8	3	2	29	10	+19	19	
3	Caxias	13	5	6	2	14	11	+3	16	
4	Novo Hamburgo	13	5	5	3	14	10	+4	15	
5	Juventude	13	4	7	2	16	14	+2	15	
6	Santa Cruz	13	3	9	1	11	10	+1	15	
7	Brasil de Pelotas	13	3	6	4	8	10	−2	12	
8	Aimoré	13	3	6	4	8	14	−6	12	
9	São Borja	13	2	8	3	9	13	−4	12	
10	Esportivo	13	4	3	6	10	18	−8	11	
11	Internacional de Santa Maria	13	2	7	4	7	9	−2	11	
12	Pelotas	13	2	6	5	6	17	−11	10	
13	Gaúcho	13	3	2	8	12	23	−11	8	
14	Rio-Grandense	13	2	3	8	11	21	−10	7	

Updated to match(es) played on December 8, 1985. Source: RSSSF.com
Rules for classification: 1) points; 2) wins; 3) goal difference; 4) number of goals scored.

==== Final standings ====
Pos	Team	Pld	W	D	L	GF	GA	GD	Pts	Qualification or relegation
1	Grêmio	26	18	5	3	56	17	+39	41	Champions
2	Internacional	26	17	6	3	51	19	+32	40	
3	Novo Hamburgo	26	11	10	5	34	22	+12	32	
4	Caxias	26	9	11	6	26	24	+2	29	
5	Juventude	26	8	10	8	27	27	0	26	
6	Internacional de Santa Maria	26	6	14	6	17	18	−1	26	
7	Santa Cruz	26	6	14	6	20	22	−2	26	
8	Brasil de Pelotas	26	7	10	9	18	23	−5	24	
9	Pelotas	26	7	10	9	20	31	−11	24	
10	Esportivo	26	7	10	9	16	28	−12	24	
11	Aimoré	26	6	9	11	18	28	−10	21	
12	São Borja	26	4	13	9	16	25	−9	21	
13	Gaúcho	26	6	4	16	22	42	−20	16	Relegated
14	Rio-Grandense	26	3	8	15	21	39	−18	14	Relegated

Updated to match(es) played on December 8, 1985. Source: RSSSF.com
Rules for classification: 1) points; 2) wins; 3) goal difference; 4) number of goals scored.
