= Eurico (footballer, born 1948) =

Brazilian footballer (born 1948)

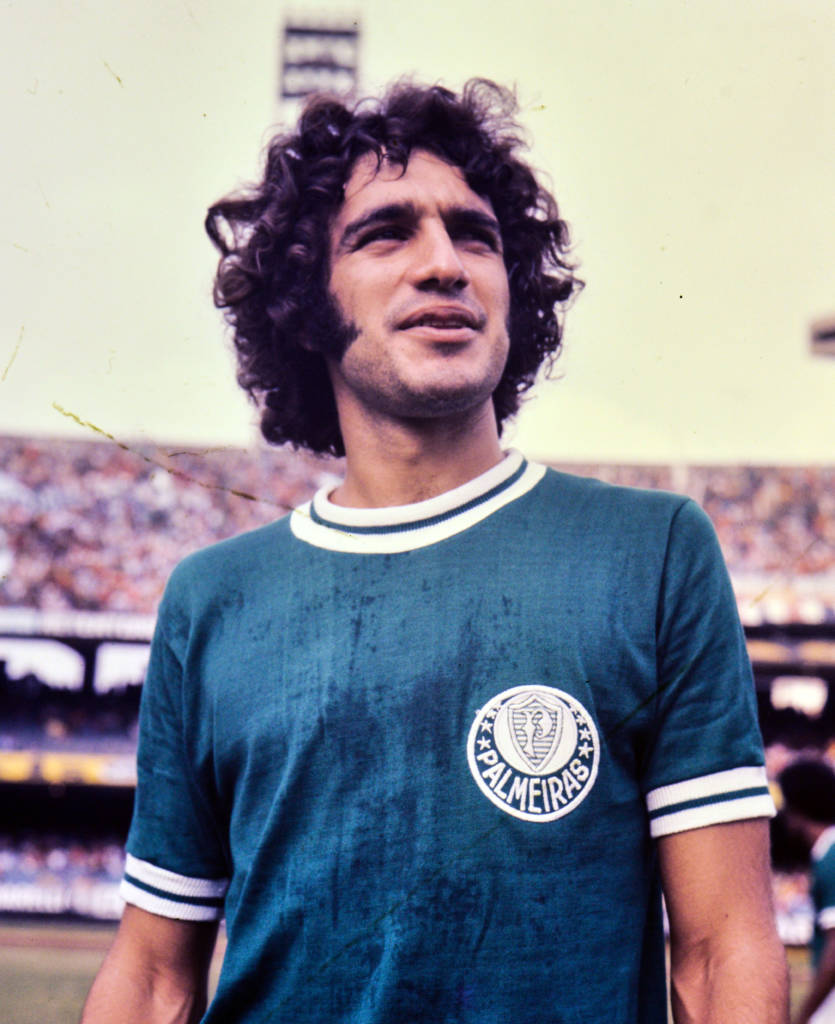
- Eurico in 1974

Personal information
- Full name: Eurico Pedro de Faria
- Date of birth: 3 April 1948 (age 78)
- Place of birth: Uberlândia, Minas Gerais, Brazil
- Height: 1.76 m (5 ft 9 in)
- Position: Right-back

Youth career
- 1967–1968: Botafogo–SP

Senior career*
Years	Team	Apps	(Gls)
1968–1975	Palmeiras	467	(4)
1976–1982	Grêmio	60	(1)

International career
1969	São Paulo		(0)
1971–1972	Brazil	2	(0)
- * Club domestic league appearances and goals

Eurico Pedro de Faria (born 3 April 1948), more commonly known as Eurico, is a retired Brazilian footballer. He primarily played as a right-back for Palmeiras and Grêmio throughout the 1970s, achieving several titles with the former throughout the first half of the decade. He would also represent his home country internationally in the Brazil Independence Cup.

== Club career ==
Eurico was born on 3 April 1948 in Uberlândia, but he would move to Ribeirão Preto when he was only six years old and would later play in the youth sector of Botafogo–SP at the age of 16. Following an impressive performance in the first half of 1968, he would catch the interest of Palmeiras who signed him for the second half on a loan before later being fully incorporated into the club as a replacement for Djalma Santos. His first senior match would be on 21 July in a friendly against Vasco da Gama in a 4–3 win. This would lead him to be called up to play for São Paulo. Throughout his career, he was a part of the famously strong Palmeiras defense alongside players such as Émerson Leão, Luís Pereira, Alfredo and Zeca. He was characterized by his great physical capabilities as he would rarely face severe enough injuries to where he was unable to play, enjoying consistent attendance in games. In terms of his defensive abilities, he primarily turned his body sideways when facing a forward, allowing for easy supports to his teammates Ademir da Guia, Leivinha and Edu Bala. In the following seasons with the club, he would be a part of the winning squads for the 1969, 1972 and 1973 Campeonato Brasileiro Série A. He would also earn the 1972 and the 1974 Campeonato Paulista titles by the time of his final season with the club in 1975 following his final match on 3 December in a 4–2 loss to Fluminense.

During the 1976 Campeonato Brasileiro Série A, he would begin to play for Grêmio where he would play alongside Éder Aleixo, Tarciso and Tadeu Ricci as they would form the main defensive formation that would have the club win the 1977 Campeonato Gaúcho. He would play with the club until his retirement in 1982.

== International career ==
Eurico would represent his home country of Brazil in the 1971 Copa Roca and in the Brazil Independence Cup.

== Personal life ==
Eurico would later marry at some point and have four children alongside two grandchildren. He currently teaches youth football at the Jardim Florida Football Academy at Ribeirão Preto. Despite his retirement, he remains a dedicated fan to Botafogo following his early childhood devotion to the club, commenting:

I am still a passionate fan of Botafogo. I continue to watch Botafogo games on television and listen on the radio. I still support this club that opened the doors for me to football.
