= Jorge Leandro =

Brazilian footballer

Personal information
- Full name: Jorge Leandro Martins Fraga
- Date of birth: 2 March 1960 (age 66)
- Place of birth: Porto Alegre, Brazil
- Position: Midfielder

Senior career*
| Years | Team | Apps | (Gls) |
| 1977–1980 | Grêmio | | |
| 1979 | → Operário-MS (loan) | | |
| 1981–1982 | Operário-MS | | |
| 1982–1983 | Grêmio | | |
| 1983 | Coritiba | | |
| 1984–1987 | Bahia | | |

International career
| 1978–1979 | Brazil U20 | | |
- * Club domestic league appearances and goals as of 16 May 2024

Jorge Leandro Martins Fraga (born 2 March 1960), better known as Jorge Leandro, is a Brazilian former professional footballer who played as a midfielder.

== Career ==
Revealed in Grêmio youth sectors, Jorge Leandro stood out for his driving ability and speed. He was state champion with the club three times and was part of the winning squad of the 1983 Copa Libertadores. He also had winning spells at Operário-MS and Bahia, where he ended his career at only 28 years old. He also stood out for tournaments with the Brazil under-20 team during the years 1978 and 1979.

== Personal life ==
His son, Leanderson, is also a professional footballer.

== Honours ==
Grêmio

- Copa Libertadores: 1983
- Campeonato Gaúcho: 1977, 1979, 1980

Operário

- Campeonato Sul-Mato-Grossense: 1981

Bahia

- Campeonato Baiano: 1986, 1987
