= Vilson =

Vilson is a masculine given name. Notable people with the name include:

- Vilson Ahmeti (born 1951), Albanian politician
- Vilson Caković (born 1991), Serbian footballer
- Vilson Cereja (born 1955), Brazilian footballer
- Vilson Džoni (born 1950), Croatian footballer
- Vilson Tadei (born 1956), Brazilian footballer and manager
- Vilson Xavier de Menezes Júnior (born 1988), Brazilian footballer
