= Jurandir =

Jurandir is both a given name and a surname. Notable people with the name include:

- Jurandir (footballer, born 1912), full name Jurandir Corrêa dos Santos (1912–1972), Brazilian football goalkeeper
- Jurandir (footballer, born 1938), full name Álvaro Vilela Jurandir, Brazilian football defender
- Jurandir (footballer, born 1940), full name Jurandir de Freitas (1940–1996), Brazilian football centre-back
- Jurandir (footballer, born 1951), full name Jurandir de Andrade Arrué (1951–2019), Brazilian football winger
