= Alcino =

Alcino is a given name relatively common in Portuguese language countries. Notable people with the name include:

- Alcino (footballer), full name Alcino Neves dos Santos Filho (1951–2006), Brazilian football forward
- Alcindo Holder (born 1982), Barbadean cricketer
- Alcino Izaacs (born 1993), Namibian rugby union player
- Alcino João do Nascimento (1922–2014), Brazilian convict for the assassination attempt of journalist and politician Carlos Lacerda
- Alcino Pinto (195?–2020), São Toméan politician
- Alcino J. Silva (born 1961), Portuguese-American neuroscientist
- Alcino Silva (born 1990), San Toméan canoeist
- Zé Alcino (born 1974), full name José Alcino Rosa, Brazilian football forward
