= Dirceu Mendes =

Brazilian footballer

Personal information
- Full name: Dirceu Mendes
- Date of birth: 17 April 1953 (age 73)
- Place of birth: Cambé, Brazil
- Height: 1.75 m (5 ft 9 in)
- Position: Left back

Senior career*
Years	Team	Apps	(Gls)
1971–1973	CA Mourãoense		
1973–1978	Londrina		
1974	→ Ferroviária (loan)		
1975	→ Atlético Paranaense (loan)		
1979–1982	Grêmio	178	(3)
1982	Santa Cruz		
1983	América-SP		
1983	Paulista		
1984	Douradense		
1984	Londrina		
1984–1985	Juventude		
1985	Avaí		
1986–1987	Cascavel EC		
- * Club domestic league appearances and goals as of 17 May 2024

Dirceu Mendes (born 17 April 1953) is a Brazilian former professional footballer who played as a left back.

== Career ==
A left back, Dirceu Mendes was part of the Brazilian champion squad in 1981 with Grêmio FBPA. He played 178 matches for the club and scored three goals.

== Honours ==
Grêmio

- Campeonato Brasileiro: 1981
- Campeonato Gaúcho: 1979, 1980
