= Leanderson =

Leanderson may refer to:

- Leanderson Collonia Fraga (born 1982), Brazilian football midfielder
- Leanderson da Silva Genésio (born 1997), Brazilian football forward
- Matt Leanderson (1931–2006), American rower
