= 1977 Campeonato Gaúcho =

Campeonato Gaúcho
- Season: 1977
- Champions: Grêmio
- Relegated: Cachoeira; Estrela; Gaúcho; Riograndense; São Paulo; Ypiranga de Erechim
- Copa Brasil: Grêmio; Internacional; Juventude; Caxias; Brasil de Pelotas
- Matches: 311
- Goals: 591 (1.9 per match)
- Top goalscorer: Flávio (Pelotas); Luís Freire (Esportivo) – 13 goals
- Biggest home win: Grêmio 10–0 Pelotas (July 31, 1977)
- Biggest away win: Santo Ângelo 1-5 Pelotas (May 4, 1977); Cruzeiro 0–4 Grêmio Bagé (May 29, 1977)
- Highest scoring: Grêmio 10–0 Pelotas (July 31, 1977)

The 57th season of the Campeonato Gaúcho kicked off on March 26, 1977, and ended on September 25, 1977. Twenty-four teams participated. Grêmio won their 20th title. Six teams were relegated.

== Participating teams ==
Club	Stadium	Home location	Previous season
14 de Julho	Vermelhão da Serra	Passo Fundo	–
Associação Santa Cruz	Plátanos	Santa Cruz do Sul	16th
Atlético de Carazinho	Paulo Coutinho	Carazinho	10th
Brasil	Bento Freitas	Pelotas	–
Cachoeira	Joaquim Vidal	Cachoeira do Sul	–
Cruzeiro	Estrelão	Porto Alegre	15th
Caxias	Centenário	Caxias do Sul	4th
Esportivo	Montanha	Bento Gonçalves	3rd
Estrela	Walter Jobim	Estrela	8th
Gaúcho	Wolmar Salton	Passo Fundo	14th
Grêmio	Pedra Moura	Bagé	12th
Grêmio	Olímpico	Porto Alegre	2nd
Guarany	Estrela D'Alva	Bagé	11th
Internacional	Beira-Rio	Porto Alegre	1st
Internacional	Presidente Vargas	Santa Maria	9th
Juventude	Alfredo Jaconi	Caxias do Sul	6th
Novo Hamburgo	Santa Rosa	Novo Hamburgo	–
Pelotas	Boca do Lobo	Pelotas	28th
Riograndense	Eucaliptos	Santa Maria	18th
São Borja	Vicente Goulart	São Borja	7th
São Luiz	19 de Outubro	Ijuí	17th
São Paulo	Aldo Dapuzzo	Rio Grande	–
Santo Ângelo	Zona Norte	Santo Ângelo	–
Ypiranga	Colosso da Lagoa	Erechim	13th

== System ==
The championship would have four stages.:

- First phase: The twenty-four clubs would be divided into two groups of twelve teams, specifically sorted so traditional or regional rivals would be in different groups. Each team would play against the teams of their own group once, and after that, it would play twice against their rival in the other group, totalling 13 matches. The four best teams in each group qualified to the Second phase, and among them, the champions of each group would play each other to define the champions of the first stage, which would earn one point to the Finals. The three bottom teams in each group were relegated, and the other ten remaining teams qualified to the Repechage.
- Repechage: The ten teams would be divided into two groups of five. Each team played against the teams of its won group twice. The best team in each group qualified to the Second phase.
- Second phase: The remaining ten teams would play each other twice. The best team in each round would win a point for the Finals.
- Finals: The winners of the first stage and the two rounds of the second stage qualified to this stage. Each participant would have one point allotted to them by stage won, and the teams would play each other until one reached four points, with that team winning the title.

== Championship ==
=== First phase ===
==== Group A ====
Pos	Team	Pld	W	D	L	GF	GA	GD	Pts	Qualification or relegation
1	Internacional	13	10	1	2	33	13	+20	21	Qualified to First phase Finals
2	Caxias	13	8	3	2	15	6	+9	19	Qualified to Second phase
3	Esportivo	13	7	4	2	17	8	+9	18	Qualified to Second phase
4	Brasil de Pelotas	13	5	7	1	13	7	+6	17	Qualified to Second phase
5	Internacional de Santa Maria	13	5	5	3	16	11	+5	15	Qualified to Repechage
6	São Luiz	13	5	4	4	14	16	−2	14	Qualified to Repechage
7	14 de Julho	13	5	3	5	12	14	−2	13	Qualified to Repechage
8	Grêmio Bagé	13	4	4	5	12	15	−3	12	Qualified to Repechage
9	Atlético de Carazinho	13	5	2	6	10	14	−4	12	Qualified to Repechage
10	Cachoeira	13	3	3	7	14	17	−3	9	Relegated
11	São Paulo	13	2	2	9	7	20	−13	6	Relegated
12	Estrela	13	1	3	9	9	19	−10	5	Relegated

Updated to match(es) played on May 15, 1977. Source: RSSSF.com
Rules for classification: 1) points; 2) wins; 3) goal difference; 4) number of goals scored.

==== Group B ====
Pos	Team	Pld	W	D	L	GF	GA	GD	Pts	Qualification or relegation
1	Grêmio	13	12	0	1	29	4	+25	24	Qualified to First phase Finals
2	Juventude	13	8	0	5	20	10	+10	16	Qualified to Second phase
3	Associação Santa Cruz	13	7	2	4	18	11	+7	16	Qualified to Second phase
4	Pelotas	13	6	4	3	18	12	+6	16	Qualified to Second phase
5	Novo Hamburgo	13	5	4	4	8	9	−1	14	Qualified to Repechage
6	São Borja	13	4	4	5	11	24	−13	12	Qualified to Repechage
7	Guarany de Bagé	13	4	3	6	11	14	−3	11	Qualified to Repechage
8	Cruzeiro	13	2	6	5	11	18	−7	10	Qualified to Repechage
9	Santo Ângelo	13	2	6	5	10	19	−9	10	Qualified to Repechage
10	Gaúcho	13	3	3	7	9	13	−4	9	Relegated
11	Ypiranga de Erechim	13	2	4	7	7	14	−7	8	Relegated
12	Riograndense	13	1	3	9	11	27	−16	5	Relegated

Updated to match(es) played on May 15, 1977. Source: RSSSF.com
Rules for classification: 1) points; 2) wins; 3) goal difference; 4) number of goals scored.

==== Finals ====
Team 1	Agg.	Team 2	1st leg	2nd leg
Internacional	1–0	Grêmio	1–0	0–0

=== Repechage ===
==== Group A ====
Pos	Team	Pld	W	D	L	GF	GA	GD	Pts	Qualification or relegation
1	Cruzeiro	8	4	4	0	8	1	+7	12	Qualified to Second phase
2	Internacional de Santa Maria	8	4	3	1	8	4	+4	11	
3	Atlético de Carazinho	8	3	4	1	7	2	+5	10	
4	Guarany de Bagé	8	2	2	4	6	10	−4	6	
5	São Borja	8	0	1	7	1	13	−12	1	

Updated to match(es) played on July 10, 1977. Source: RSSSF.com
Rules for classification: 1) points; 2) wins; 3) goal difference; 4) number of goals scored.

==== Group B ====
Pos	Team	Pld	W	D	L	GF	GA	GD	Pts	Qualification or relegation
1	Novo Hamburgo	8	5	2	1	6	1	+5	12	Qualified to Second phase
2	Grêmio Bagé	8	5	1	2	7	4	+3	11	
3	São Luiz	8	4	1	3	10	7	+3	9	
4	14 de Julho	8	3	1	4	10	7	+3	7	
5	Santo Ângelo	8	0	1	7	2	16	−14	1	

Updated to match(es) played on July 10, 1977. Source: RSSSF.com
Rules for classification: 1) points; 2) wins; 3) goal difference; 4) number of goals scored.

=== Second phase ===
==== First round ====
Pos	Team	Pld	W	D	L	GF	GA	GD	Pts	Qualification or relegation
1	Grêmio	9	6	3	0	21	1	+20	15	Qualified to Finals
2	Internacional	9	6	2	1	13	3	+10	14	
3	Juventude	9	5	2	2	13	5	+8	12	
4	Associação Santa Cruz	9	3	3	3	8	10	−2	9	
5	Cruzeiro	9	3	2	4	7	13	−6	8	
6	Caxias	9	2	3	4	7	9	−2	7	
7	Esportivo	9	2	3	4	6	8	−2	7	
8	Brasil de Pelotas	9	2	3	4	4	10	−6	7	
9	Pelotas	9	1	4	4	4	16	−12	6	
10	Novo Hamburgo	9	1	3	5	3	11	−8	5	

Updated to match(es) played on August 18, 1977. Source: RSSSF.com
Rules for classification: 1) points; 2) wins; 3) goal difference; 4) number of goals scored.

==== Second round ====
Pos	Team	Pld	W	D	L	GF	GA	GD	Pts	Qualification or relegation
1	Grêmio	9	7	1	1	19	3	+16	15	Qualified to Finals
2	Caxias	9	6	2	1	11	3	+8	14	
3	Internacional	9	6	1	2	14	4	+10	13	
4	Juventude	9	5	2	2	9	4	+5	12	
5	Esportivo	9	5	1	3	11	9	+2	11	
6	Novo Hamburgo	9	2	3	4	2	10	−8	7	
7	Associação Santa Cruz	9	0	5	4	4	9	−5	5	
8	Pelotas	9	0	5	4	2	10	−8	5	
9	Cruzeiro	9	0	5	4	3	12	−9	5	
10	Brasil de Pelotas	9	0	3	6	1	12	−11	3	

Updated to match(es) played on September 18, 1977. Source: RSSSF.com
Rules for classification: 1) points; 2) wins; 3) goal difference; 4) number of goals scored.

==== Final standings ====
Pos	Team	Pld	W	D	L	GF	GA	GD	Pts	Qualification or relegation
1	Grêmio	18	13	4	1	40	4	+36	30	Qualified to Campeonato Brasileiro
2	Internacional	18	12	3	3	27	7	+20	27	Qualified to Campeonato Brasileiro
3	Juventude	18	10	4	4	22	9	+13	24	Qualified to Campeonato Brasileiro
4	Caxias	18	8	5	5	18	12	+6	21	Qualified to Campeonato Brasileiro Selective Tournament
5	Esportivo	18	7	4	7	17	17	0	18	
6	Associação Santa Cruz	18	3	8	7	12	19	−7	14	
7	Cruzeiro	18	3	7	8	10	25	−15	13	
8	Novo Hamburgo	18	3	6	9	5	21	−16	12	
9	Pelotas	18	1	9	8	6	26	−20	11	Qualified to Campeonato Brasileiro Selective Tournament
10	Brasil de Pelotas	18	2	6	10	5	22	−17	10	Qualified to Campeonato Brasileiro Selective Tournament

Updated to match(es) played on September 18, 1977. Source: RSSSF.com
Rules for classification: 1) points; 2) wins; 3) goal difference; 4) number of goals scored.

==== Finals ====
Teams			Scores			
Team 1	Points	Team 2	1st leg	2nd leg	3rd leg	Agg.
Grêmio	4:1	Internacional	1:0	—	—	1:0

25 September 1977
Finals

Grêmio	1 – 0	Internacional
André Catimba 42'

Olímpico, Porto Alegre
Attendance: 57,186
Referee: Luís Zetterman Torres

=== Selective Tournament ===
Originally, only the Finalists would qualify for the Campeonato Brasileiro (in case there were only two finalists, the best team from Caxias do Sul would qualify). However, once it was decided to expand the championship for 1978, two more berths were opened, and were intended to be given to one team from Caxias do Sul and another from Pelotas, thus, a selective tournament was played with the two teams from each city. With Juventude already qualified, Caxias won the other berth in their group, while Brasil de Pelotas qualified in the Pelotas group.

==== Group A ====
Pos	Team	Pld	W	D	L	GF	GA	GD	Pts	Qualification or relegation
1	Caxias	2	2	0	0	4	1	+3	4	Qualified to Campeonato Brasileiro
2	Juventude	2	0	0	2	1	4	−3	0	Qualified to Campeonato Brasileiro

Updated to match(es) played on October 2, 1977. Source: Sumulastche.blogspot
Rules for classification: 1) points; 2) wins; 3) goal difference; 4) number of goals scored.

==== Group B ====
Pos	Team	Pld	W	D	L	GF	GA	GD	Pts	Qualification or relegation
1	Brasil de Pelotas	3	2	0	1	2	1	+1	4	Qualified to Campeonato Brasileiro
2	Pelotas	3	1	0	2	1	2	−1	2	

Updated to match(es) played on October 9, 1977. Source: Sumulastche.blogspot
Rules for classification: 1) points; 2) wins; 3) goal difference; 4) number of goals scored.
