= 1987 Campeonato Gaúcho =

Campeonato Gaúcho
- Season: 1987
- Champions: Grêmio
- Relegated: Novo Hamburgo; São Borja
- Blue Module: Caxias; Esportivo; Juventude; Santa Cruz
- Matches: 224
- Goals: 457 (2.04 per match)
- Top goalscorer: Amarildo (Internacional) – 19 goals
- Biggest home win: Internacional 6-1 Pelotas (April 16, 1987)
- Biggest away win: Santa Cruz 0-4 Internacional (February 12, 1987)
- Highest scoring: Novo Hamburgo 4-5 Lajeadense (March 8, 1987)

The 67th season of the Campeonato Gaúcho kicked off on February 2, 1987, and ended on July 19, 1987. Fourteen teams participated. Holders Grêmio won their 25th title. Novo Hamburgo and São Borja were relegated.

== Participating teams ==
Club	Stadium	Home location	Previous season
Brasil	Bento Freitas	Pelotas	8th
Caxias	Centenário	Caxias do Sul	5th
Esportivo	Montanha	Bento Gonçalves	10th
Grêmio	Olímpico	Porto Alegre	1st
Internacional	Beira-Rio	Porto Alegre	2nd
Internacional	Presidente Vargas	Santa Maria	7th
Juventude	Alfredo Jaconi	Caxias do Sul	3rd
Lajeadense	Florestal	Lajeado	2nd (Second level)
Novo Hamburgo	Santa Rosa	Novo Hamburgo	4th
Passo Fundo	Vermelhão da Serra	Passo Fundo	1st (Second level)
Pelotas	Boca do Lobo	Pelotas	12th
São Borja	Vicente Goulart	São Borja	9th
São Paulo	Aldo Dapuzzo	Rio Grande	11th
Santa Cruz	Plátanos	Santa Cruz do Sul	6th

== System ==
The championship would have two stages.:

- First phase: The fourteen clubs played each other in a double round-robin system. At the end of each round, the four best teams qualified to another double round-robin tournament, the winner of which earned one bonus point to the Final hexagonal. The six best teams in the sum of both rounds qualified into the Final hexagonal and the two teams with the fewest points were relegated.
- Final hexagonal: The six remaining teams played each other in a double round-robin system; the team with the most points won the title.

== Championship ==
=== First phase ===
==== First round ====
Pos	Team	Pld	W	D	L	GF	GA	GD	Pts	Qualification or relegation
1	Internacional	13	8	4	1	28	8	+20	20	Qualified
2	Caxias	13	6	7	0	15	7	+8	19	Qualified
3	Juventude	13	6	5	2	14	8	+6	17	Qualified
4	Grêmio	13	6	4	3	19	12	+7	16	Qualified
5	Brasil de Pelotas	13	4	6	3	12	9	+3	14	
6	Santa Cruz	13	4	6	3	12	16	−4	14	
7	Esportivo	13	5	3	5	12	13	−1	13	
8	São Paulo	13	4	5	4	18	15	+3	13	
9	Pelotas	13	3	5	5	9	14	−5	11	
10	Passo Fundo	13	3	4	6	6	11	−5	10	
11	São Borja	13	2	6	5	9	18	−9	10	
12	Lajeadense	13	2	5	6	12	17	−5	9	
13	Internacional de Santa Maria	13	2	5	6	7	15	−8	9	
14	Novo Hamburgo	13	3	1	9	13	23	−10	7	

Updated to match(es) played on March 15, 1987. Source: RSSSF.com
Rules for classification: 1) points; 2) wins; 3) goal difference; 4) number of goals scored.

===== Copa 250 Anos da Cidade de Rio Grande =====
Pos	Team	Pld	W	D	L	GF	GA	GD	Pts	Qualification or relegation
1	Caxias	6	3	1	2	6	5	+1	7 (Note: Grêmio and Caxias tied in all criteria; Caxias won on a coin toss.)	Champions; one bonus point
2	Grêmio	6	3	1	2	6	5	+1	7	
3	Internacional	6	2	1	3	6	6	0	5	
4	Juventude	6	1	3	2	4	6	−2	5	

Updated to match(es) played on April 8, 1987. Source: RSSSF.com
Rules for classification: 1) points; 2) wins; 3) goal difference; 4) number of goals scored.

==== Second round ====
Pos	Team	Pld	W	D	L	GF	GA	GD	Pts	Qualification or relegation
1	Internacional	13	6	6	1	19	5	+14	18	Qualified
2	Juventude	13	5	8	0	15	8	+7	18	Qualified
3	Internacional de Santa Maria	13	4	8	1	11	3	+8	16	Qualified
4	Grêmio	13	6	3	4	15	6	+9	15	Qualified
5	Esportivo	13	5	5	3	15	13	+2	15	
6	Passo Fundo	13	4	5	4	12	13	−1	13	
7	Brasil de Pelotas	13	2	9	2	10	9	+1	13	
8	Caxias	13	4	4	5	12	14	−2	12	
9	São Paulo	13	4	4	5	10	14	−4	12	
10	Santa Cruz	13	4	4	5	11	16	−5	12	
11	Novo Hamburgo	13	2	7	4	13	14	−1	11	
12	Pelotas	13	2	6	5	9	16	−7	10	
13	Lajeadense	13	2	6	5	8	16	−8	10	
14	São Borja	13	1	5	7	7	20	−13	7	

Updated to match(es) played on May 24, 1987. Source: RSSSF.com
Rules for classification: 1) points; 2) wins; 3) goal difference; 4) number of goals scored.

===== Copa Desportista Rubem Moreira =====
Pos	Team	Pld	W	D	L	GF	GA	GD	Pts	Qualification or relegation
1	Internacional	6	4	1	1	10	4	+6	9	Champions; one bonus point
2	Grêmio	6	3	3	0	8	3	+5	9	
3	Juventude	6	1	2	3	4	8	−4	4	
4	Internacional de Santa Maria	6	1	0	5	1	8	−7	2	

Updated to match(es) played on June 14, 1987. Source: RSSSF.com
Rules for classification: 1) points; 2) wins; 3) goal difference; 4) number of goals scored.

==== Final standings ====
Pos	Team	Pld	W	D	L	GF	GA	GD	Pts	Qualification or relegation
1	Internacional	26	14	10	2	47	13	+34	38	Qualified
2	Juventude	26	11	13	2	29	16	+13	35	Qualified
3	Grêmio	26	12	7	7	34	18	+16	31	Qualified
4	Caxias	26	10	11	5	27	21	+6	31	Qualified
5	Esportivo	26	10	8	8	27	25	+2	28	Qualified
6	Brasil de Pelotas	26	6	15	5	22	18	+4	27	Qualified
7	Santa Cruz	26	8	10	8	23	32	−9	26	
8	São Paulo	26	8	9	9	28	29	−1	25	
9	Internacional de Santa Maria	26	6	13	7	18	18	0	25	
10	Passo Fundo	26	7	9	10	18	24	−6	23	
11	Pelotas	26	5	11	10	18	30	−12	21	
12	Lajeadense	26	4	11	11	20	33	−13	19	
13	Novo Hamburgo	26	5	8	13	25	37	−12	18	Relegated
14	São Borja	26	3	11	12	16	38	−22	17	Relegated

Updated to match(es) played on May 24, 1987. Source: RSSSF.com
Rules for classification: 1) points; 2) wins; 3) goal difference; 4) number of goals scored.

=== Final hexagonal ===
Pos	Team	Pld	W	D	L	GF	GA	GD	Pts	Qualification or relegation
1	Grêmio	10	6	4	0	17	7	+10	16	Champions
2	Internacional	10	5	3	2	11	6	+5	14	
3	Esportivo	10	3	5	2	6	8	−2	11	
4	Caxias	10	2	5	3	11	11	0	10	
5	Juventude	10	3	3	4	8	9	−1	9	
6	Brasil de Pelotas	10	0	2	8	6	18	−12	2	

Updated to match(es) played on July 19, 1987. Source: RSSSF.com
Rules for classification: 1) points; 2) wins; 3) goal difference; 4) number of goals scored.
