= Hélio Pires =

Brazilian footballer (1947–2022)

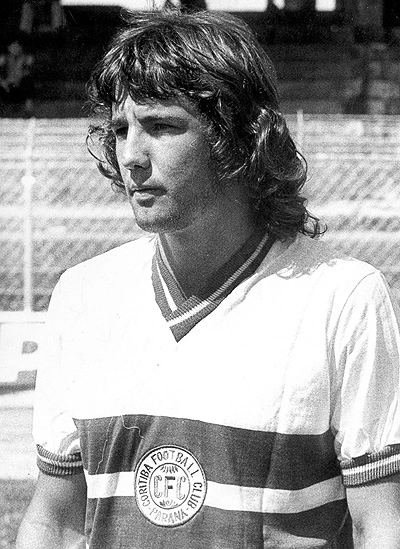

Personal information
- Full name: João Hélio Pereira Pires
- Date of birth: 22 March 1947
- Place of birth: Taquara, Rio Grande do Sul, Brazil
- Date of death: 8 January 2022 (aged 74)
- Place of death: Taquara, Rio Grande do Sul, Brazil
- Position: Forward

Youth career
- ???–1965: Novo Hamburgo
- 1965–1968: Grêmio

Senior career*
Years	Team	Apps	(Gls)
1969–1970	Grêmio	50	(19)
1970–1976	Coritiba	111	(26)
1973	→ Portuguesa (loan)		
1973	→ Santos (loan)		
1975	→ Grêmio Maringá (loan)		
1976–1977	Figueirense		
1977	Coritiba		
- * Club domestic league appearances and goals

João Hélio Pereira Pires (22 March 1947 – 8 January 2022), better known as Hélio Pires was a Brazilian footballer. Nicknamed "Touro", he played as forward for various clubs throughout the 1970s, primarily playing for Grêmio and Coritiba. He was also part of the winning Santos squad that won the 1973 Campeonato Paulista.

== Career ==
Hélio Pires began his career with Novo Hamburgo in the late 1960s, where he earned the nickname "Touro", He would attract the attention of Grêmio and would initially play for their youth sector before being promoted to the senior team in 1969 with his first goal being at the Estádio Beira-Rio. He primarily played as a classic attacking midfielder, scoring goals whilst giving assists to other forwards. Hélio played for Grêmio between 1969 and 1970, playing in 50 matches and scoring 19 goals.

For the 1970 season, he transferred to play for Coritiba. During his tenure with the club, he would participate in the 1972 Fita Azul in where a series of international friendlies where played at. He would travel to play against Fenerbahçe, Turkey, Oran, Portuguesa, Sétif and Morocco, scoring the winning goal against Sétif. He would later be a part of the winning squad for the 1973 Torneio do Povo as the club was pitted against Bahia, Atlético Mineiro, Corinthians, Flamengo and Internacional. After defeating Corinthians and Flamengo, the club would face Bahia in a heated match by referee José Marçal Filho with the match initially going poorly with Capitão Hidalgo and Cláudio Marques both being expelled from the match. Against all odds, Pires would score the equalizer in the 2–2 draw against Bahia which would secure the club's title that year as he would also be named the top scorer of the tournament.

Also in 1973, he went through Portuguesa and Santos where he would win the 1973 Campeonato Paulista with the latter. He returned to Coritiba in 1974 before being loaned once more in 1975 to Grêmio de Esportes Maringá to compete in the 1975 Campeonato Paranaense. During his tenure with the club, he was champion of the 1st round of the state, being the top scorer and elected by the fans as the best player of the squad, receiving the Troféu Guerreiro on 21 April 1975.

Hélio played 111 games for Coritiba and scored 26 goals from 1971 to 1974. He was also part of the football dynasty of the Campeonato Paranaense throughout the 1970s, winning three editions of the tournament. Between 1976 and 1977, he played for Figueirense.

== Personal life ==
Hélio Pires was born on 22 March 1947 at Taquara where he would later become a baptized Roman Catholic. Following his retirement, he remained in Taquara as a teacher for youth football. He died on 8 January 2022 following a series of heart problems. He was initially veiled at the Chapel of Taquara before later being cremated at the Jardim da Memória Crematorium.
