= Jorge Veras =

Brazilian footballer (1959–2026)

Personal information
- Full name: Jorge de Souza Veras
- Date of birth: 28 May 1959
- Place of birth: Fortaleza, Ceará, Brazil
- Date of death: 22 October 2026 (aged 67)
- Place of death: Fortaleza, Ceará, Brazil
- Height: 1.76 m (5 ft 9 in)
- Position: Forward

Youth career
- –1979: Fortaleza

Senior career*
Years	Team	Apps	(Gls)
1980–1981	Ceará		
1982	Tiradentes-CE		
1982–1984	Ferroviário		
1984–1987	Criciúma		
1987–1989	Grêmio	107	(13)
1989	Criciúma		
1989	Sport Recife		
1990	Ferroviário		
1990	Bandeirante		
1991	Avaí		
1991	Taubaté		
1992	Ferroviário		
1992	Moto Club		
1993	4 de Julho		
1993	Fortaleza		
1994	Tiradentes-CE		
1994	4 de Julho		
1995	Nacional-AM		
1995–1996	Quixadá		
1997	4 de Julho		
- * Club domestic league appearances and goals

Jorge de Souza Veras (28 May 1959 – 22 October 2026), simply known as Jorge Veras, was a Brazilian professional footballer who played as a forward.

== Career ==
Revealed by Fortaleza EC, Veras began his career playing for Ceará SC and Tiradentes-CE. In 1982, he arrived at Ferroviário, the first club where he marked history by becoming an idol, a feat he would repeat in Criciúma, Grêmio and 4 de Julho. For Criciúma, he was top scorer in the state in 1985 and champion in 1986 and 1989. For Grêmio, he became known as "Man Gre-Nal", due to the number of goals he scored against rival SC Internacional. He was top scorer in Série C in 1992 playing for Ferroviário, and champion of Piauí twice with 4 de Julho. In 1995 he would still be champion in Amazonas with Nacional.

== Personal life and death ==
Veras became a street runner in short-distance races. Veras died on 22 October 2026, at the age of 67, following complications from pancreatic cancer.

== Honours ==
Criciúma

- Campeonato Catarinense: 1986, 1989

Grêmio

- Campeonato Gaúcho: 1987, 1988

4 de Julho

- Campeonato Piauiense: 1993, 1994

Nacional

- Campeonato Amazonense: 1995

Individual

- 1992 Campeonato Brasileiro Série C top scorer: 9 goals
- 1985 Campeonato Catarinense top scorer: 21 goals
