= Ladinho =

Brazilian footballer

Personal information
- Full name: Adelardo Madalena
- Date of birth: 24 January 1947
- Place of birth: Tubarão, Brazil
- Date of death: 24 March 2022 (aged 75)
- Place of death: Tubarão, Brazil
- Height: 1.78 m (5 ft 10 in)
- Position: Left back

Senior career*
Years	Team	Apps	(Gls)
1964–1969	Ferroviário de Tubarão		
1969–1971	América de Joinville		
1970	→ Portuguesa (loan)		
1972–1974	Atlético Paranaense		
1975	América de Joinville		
1976	Atlético Paranaense		
1977–1979	Grêmio	157	(12)
1980–1981	Joinville		
1982	Avaí		

Managerial career
- 1982–1983: Avaí
- 1990–1991: Avaí
- * Club domestic league appearances and goals as of 20 May 2024

Adelardo Madalena (24 January 1947 – 24 March 2022), better known as Ladinho, was a Brazilian professional footballer and manager, who played as a left back.

== Career ==
Left back, Ladinho began his professional career at EC Ferroviário, from Tubarão. He stood out and was hired by América de Joinville, where he was champion in 1971. He also played for Joinville EC, Portuguesa, Athletico Paranaense and Grêmio, where he made 157 appearances and won the state championship twice. He ended his career in 1982 at Avaí FC, where he was also a coach shortly after retiring, and later in 1990–1991.

== Honours ==
América de Joinville

- Campeonato Catarinense: 1971

Grêmio

- Campeonato Gaúcho: 1977, 1979

== Death ==
Ladinho died of sepsis, on 24 March 2022.
