= 1980 Campeonato Gaúcho =

Campeonato Gaúcho
- Season: 1980
- Champions: Grêmio
- Relegated: Esportivo; Farroupilha; Gaúcho; Grêmio Bagé; Lajeadense; Pelotas
- Taça de Ouro: Grêmio; Internacional
- Taça de Prata: Novo Hamburgo; Internacional de Santa Maria; São Paulo
- Taça de Bronze: São Borja
- Matches played: 270
- Goals scored: 509 (1.89 per match)
- Top goalscorer: Baltazar (Grêmio) – 28 goals
- Biggest home win: Grêmio 6-0 São Borja (October 22, 1980); Grêmio 6-0 Novo Hamburgo (November 12, 1980)
- Biggest away win: Novo Hamburgo 0-4 Grêmio (October 26, 1980)
- Highest scoring: Internacional 6-1 São Borja (June 7, 1980)

The 60th season of the Campeonato Gaúcho kicked off on June 29, 1980, and ended on November 23, 1980. Sixteen teams participated. Grêmio won their 22nd title. Esportivo, Farroupilha, Gaúcho, Grêmio Bagé, Lajeadense and Pelotas were relegated.

== Participating teams ==
In early 1980, It was decided that the championship would be reduced from 20 teams to 14. To that goal, the Copa Governador do Estado was turned into a qualification tournament for the 1980 First Level, with the presence of all the teams that would have participated under the 20 teams configuration that weren't participating in any national division (except for Riograndense, which had withdrawn and was replaced by São José), with the Seven best teams qualifying to it. However, after that tournament ended, the eight and ninth-placed teams were included in the First level as well, sparking protests from the other four clubs that had participated, who subsequently withdrew from disputing the Second level that year.

Club	Stadium	Home location	Previous season
Brasil	Bento Freitas	Pelotas	7th
Caxias	Centenário	Caxias do Sul	5th
Esportivo	Montanha	Bento Gonçalves	2nd
Farroupilha	Nicolau Fico	Pelotas	13th
Gaúcho	Wolmar Salton	Passo Fundo	10th
Grêmio	Pedra Moura	Bagé	15th
Grêmio	Olímpico	Porto Alegre	1st
Guarany	Estrela D'Alva	Bagé	17th
Internacional	Beira-Rio	Porto Alegre	3rd
Internacional	Presidente Vargas	Santa Maria	9th
Juventude	Alfredo Jaconi	Caxias do Sul	8th
Lajeadense	Florestal	Lajeado	1st (Second level)
Novo Hamburgo	Santa Rosa	Novo Hamburgo	6th
Pelotas	Boca do Lobo	Pelotas	12th
São Borja	Vicente Goulart	São Borja	14th
São Paulo	Aldo Dapuzzo	Rio Grande	4th

== System ==
The championship would have two stages.:

- First phase: The sixteen clubs played each other in a double round-robin system. The six best teams qualified to the Final phase, with the best teams in each round earning one bonus point. the bottom six teams in the sum of both rounds were relegated.
- Final phase: The six remaining teams played each other in a double round-robin system; the team with the most points won the title.

== Championship ==
=== First phase ===
==== First round ====
Pos	Team	Pld	W	D	L	GF	GA	GD	Pts	Qualification or relegation
1	Grêmio	15	11	3	1	23	6	+17	25	Qualified;One extra point
2	Internacional de Santa Maria	15	6	6	3	14	9	+5	18	
3	São Paulo	15	6	5	4	12	8	+4	17	
4	Novo Hamburgo	15	6	5	4	12	12	0	17	
5	Caxias	15	5	7	3	10	8	+2	17	
6	São Borja	15	5	7	3	9	7	+2	17	
7	Gaúcho	15	6	4	5	16	14	+2	16	
8	Internacional	15	5	6	4	15	11	+4	16	
9	Grêmio Bagé	15	5	3	7	12	13	−1	13	
10	Esportivo	15	5	3	7	15	17	−2	13	
11	Guarany de Bagé	15	5	3	7	10	18	−8	13	
12	Pelotas	15	4	5	6	11	13	−2	13	
13	Juventude	15	4	5	6	9	12	−3	13	
14	Brasil de Pelotas	15	2	9	4	6	10	−4	13	
15	Lajeadense	15	4	3	8	15	21	−6	11	
16	Farroupilha	15	3	2	10	8	20	−12	8	

Updated to match(es) played on August 28, 1980. Source: RSSSF.com
Rules for classification: 1) points; 2) wins; 3) goal difference; 4) number of goals scored.

==== Second round ====
Pos	Team	Pld	W	D	L	GF	GA	GD	Pts	Qualification or relegation
1	Internacional	15	11	2	2	29	6	+23	24	Qualified;One extra point
2	Grêmio	15	10	3	2	20	5	+15	23	
3	Novo Hamburgo	15	8	3	4	15	12	+3	19	
4	Juventude	15	6	7	2	16	12	+4	19	
5	São Borja	15	7	4	4	12	13	−1	18	
6	Guarany de Bagé	15	5	6	4	18	19	−1	16	
7	Internacional de Santa Maria	15	5	6	4	10	12	−2	16	
8	Brasil de Pelotas	15	5	5	5	20	14	+6	15	
9	São Paulo	15	5	5	5	16	14	+2	15	
10	Lajeadense	15	4	5	6	22	20	+2	13	
11	Esportivo	15	1	11	3	9	12	−3	13	
12	Caxias	15	5	2	8	17	21	−4	12	
13	Pelotas	15	3	5	7	8	15	−7	11	
14	Grêmio Bagé	15	3	4	8	14	25	−11	10	
15	Gaúcho	15	3	3	9	13	25	−12	9	
16	Farroupilha	15	2	3	10	9	23	−14	7	

Updated to match(es) played on October 21, 1980. Source: RSSSF.com
Rules for classification: 1) points; 2) wins; 3) goal difference; 4) number of goals scored.

==== Final standings ====
Pos	Team	Pld	W	D	L	GF	GA	GD	Pts	Qualification or relegation
1	Grêmio	30	21	6	3	43	11	+32	48	Qualified
2	Internacional	30	16	8	6	44	17	+27	40	Qualified
3	Novo Hamburgo	30	14	8	8	27	24	+3	36	Qualified
4	São Borja	30	12	11	7	21	20	+1	35	Qualified
5	Internacional de Santa Maria	30	11	12	7	24	21	+3	34	Qualified
6	Juventude	30	10	12	8	25	24	+1	32	Qualified
7	São Paulo	30	11	10	9	28	22	+6	32	
8	Caxias	30	10	9	11	27	29	−2	29	
9	Guarany de Bagé	30	10	9	11	28	37	−9	29	
10	Brasil de Pelotas	30	7	14	9	26	24	+2	28	
11	Esportivo	30	6	14	10	24	29	−5	26	Relegated
12	Gaúcho	30	9	7	14	29	39	−10	25	Relegated
13	Lajeadense	30	8	8	14	37	41	−4	24	Relegated
14	Pelotas	30	7	10	13	19	28	−9	24	Relegated
15	Grêmio Bagé	30	8	7	15	26	38	−12	23	Relegated
16	Farroupilha	30	5	5	20	17	43	−26	15	Relegated

Updated to match(es) played on October 21, 1980. Source: RSSSF.com
Rules for classification: 1) points; 2) wins; 3) goal difference; 4) number of goals scored.

=== Final phase ===
Pos	Team	Pld	W	D	L	GF	GA	GD	Pts	Qualification or relegation
1	Grêmio	10	7	3	0	22	1	+21	18	Champions;1981 Taça de Ouro
2	Internacional	10	7	2	1	23	5	+18	17	1981 Taça de Ouro
3	Internacional de Santa Maria	10	2	4	4	6	11	−5	8	1981 Taça de Prata
4	Novo Hamburgo	10	2	3	5	7	18	−11	7	1981 Taça de Prata
5	São Borja	10	1	4	5	6	19	−13	6	
6	Juventude	10	0	6	4	4	14	−10	6	

Updated to match(es) played on November 23, 1980. Source: RSSSF.com
Rules for classification: 1) points; 2) wins; 3) goal difference; 4) number of goals scored.

=== Taça de Bronze Selective Tournament ===
This tournament was disputed by all the First level teams that hadn't qualified to either the Taça de Ouro or the Taça de Bronze. It would be played in a double round-robin formst, with the winner qualifying to the Taça de Bronze.

Pos	Team	Pld	W	D	L	GF	GA	GD	Pts	Qualification or relegation
1	São Borja	8	5	3	0	9	2	+7	13	Qualified
2	Caxias	8	3	5	0	11	5	+6	11	
3	Juventude	8	3	3	2	7	7	0	9	
4	Guarany de Bagé	8	2	1	5	3	6	−3	5	
5	Brasil de Pelotas	8	0	2	6	3	11	−8	2	

Updated to match(es) played on February 19, 1981. Source: RSSSF.com
Rules for classification: 1) points; 2) wins; 3) goal difference; 4) number of goals scored.
