= Jorge Py =

Brazilian footballer (1898–1930)

Personal information
- Full name: Jorge Tavares Py
- Date of birth: 14 November 1898
- Place of birth: Porto Alegre, Brazil
- Date of death: 9 March 1930 (aged 31)
- Place of death: Teresópolis, Brazil
- Position: Defender

Youth career
- Grêmio

Senior career*
Years	Team	Apps	(Gls)
1914–1925	Grêmio	143	(9)
1926–1930	Fluminense	76	(0)
- * Club domestic league appearances and goals as of 21 May 2024

Jorge Tavares Py (14 November 1898 – 9 March 1930) was a Brazilian footballer who played as a defender.

== Career ==
A renowned defender at Grêmio, he made 143 appearances for the club, winning the Porto Alegre city championship several times and the state championship twice. In 1926 he arrived at Fluminense where he won the Torneio Início in 1927 and the Campeonato Carioca runners-up. He also played as a basketball player.

== Personal life ==
Jorge Py is half-brother of Aurélio de Lima Py, president of Grêmio FBPA and brother of João Tavares Py, also a footballer.

== Honours ==
=== Football ===
Grêmio

- Campeonato Gaúcho: 1921, 1922
- Campeonato Citadino de Porto Alegre: 1919, 1920, 1921, 1922, 1923, 1925

Fluminense

- Torneio Início: 1927

=== Basketball ===
Fluminense

- Campeonato Carioca de Basquete: 1926, 1927

== Death ==
Jorge Py died in a landslide occurred in Teresópolis, in the early hours of 9 March 1930, when returning by train to Rio de Janeiro after playing a friendly football match.
