= Cléo (footballer, born 1937) =

Brazilian footballer (1937–1998)

Personal information
- Full name: Cléo Muratore de Souza
- Date of birth: 16 September 1937
- Place of birth: Porto Alegre, Brazil
- Date of death: 11 June 1998 (aged 60)
- Place of death: Porto Alegre, Brazil
- Position: Midfielder

Senior career*
Years	Team	Apps	(Gls)
1957–1961	Pelotas		
1962	Newell's Old Boys		
1963–1970	Grêmio	300	(7)
1970	Juventude		

International career
1966	Brazil	2	(0)
- * Club domestic league appearances and goals

Cléo Muratore de Souza (16 September 1937 – 11 June 1998), simply known as Cléo, was a Brazilian professional footballer who played as a midfielder.

== Career ==
Cléo made more than 300 appearances for Grêmio and was part of the state champion squad several times in the 1960s. He is also in the historic selection of EC Pelotas, a team with which he won the city championship three times.

Cléo also played for the Brazil national team in two matches, against Chile, valid for the 1966 Copa Bernardo O'Higgins.

== Personal life ==
Cleo is brother of the also footballer Paulo Souza.

== Honours ==
Pelotas

- Campeonato Citadino de Pelotas: 1957, 1958, 1960

Grêmio

- Campeonato Gaúcho: 1963, 1964, 1965, 1966, 1967, 1968
- Campeonato Citadino de Porto Alegre: 1964, 1965

Brazil

- Copa Bernardo O'Higgins: 1966
