= 1979 Campeonato Gaúcho =

Campeonato Gaúcho
- Season: 1979
- Champions: Grêmio
- Relegated: 14 de Julho de Passo Fundo; Cachoeira
- Taça de Ouro: Grêmio; Internacional; São Paulo
- Taça de Prata: Brasil de Pelotas; Caxias; Juventude; Novo Hamburgo
- Matches played: 499
- Goals scored: 976 (1.96 per match)
- Top goalscorer: Jair (Internacional) – 24 goals
- Biggest home win: Grêmio 7–0 Avenida (April 22, 1979)
- Biggest away win: Farroupilha 0–6 Internacional (April 29, 1979)
- Highest scoring: Grêmio 7–0 Avenida (April 22, 1979); Novo Hamburgo 5–2 Cachoeira (May 30, 1979)
- Longest unbeaten run: Grêmio - 35 matches

The 59th season of the Campeonato Gaúcho kicked off on March 7, 1979, and ended on December 16, 1979. Twenty teams participated. Grêmio won their 21st title. 14 de Julho de Passo Fundo and Cachoeira were relegated.

== Participating teams ==
Club	Stadium	Home location	Previous season
14 de Julho	Vermelhão da Serra	Passo Fundo	13th
Avenida	Eucaliptos	Santa Cruz do Sul	3rd (Second level)
Brasil	Bento Freitas	Pelotas	16th
Cachoeira	Joaquim Vidal	Cachoeira do Sul	2nd (Second level)
Caxias	Centenário	Caxias do Sul	3rd
Esportivo	Montanha	Bento Gonçalves	4th
Estrela	Walter Jobim	Estrela	9th
Farroupilha	Nicolau Fico	Pelotas	17th
Gaúcho	Wolmar Salton	Passo Fundo	10th
Grêmio	Pedra Moura	Bagé	11th
Grêmio	Olímpico	Porto Alegre	2nd
Guarany	Estrela D'Alva	Bagé	14th
Internacional	Beira-Rio	Porto Alegre	1st
Internacional	Presidente Vargas	Santa Maria	12th
Juventude	Alfredo Jaconi	Caxias do Sul	5th
Novo Hamburgo	Santa Rosa	Novo Hamburgo	6th
Pelotas	Boca do Lobo	Pelotas	7th
Riograndense	Eucaliptos	Santa Maria	1st (Second level)
São Borja	Vicente Goulart	São Borja	8th
São Paulo	Aldo Dapuzzo	Rio Grande	15th

== System ==
The championship would have four stages.:

- First phase: The twenty clubs played each other in a double round-robin system. The eight best teams qualified to the Final phase, with the best teams in each round and the team with the best overall record earning one bonus point. the other teams in the sum of both rounds would dispute the Torneio de Descenso.
- Torneio de Descenso: The twelve teams would be divided into two groups of six teams, in which each team played the teams if its own group in a double round-robin system. The team with the fewest points in each group would qualify to the Torneio da Morte.
- Torneio da Morte: Played in two-legged knockout ties. In the Semifinals, the two teams from the Torneio de Descenso would play each other, with the loser being relegated, and in the Finals, the winner of the Semifinals would play against the runners-up of the Second level, with the winner qualifying to the First level.
- Final phase: The eight remaining teams played each other in a double round-robin system; the team with the most points won the title.

== Championship ==
=== First phase ===
==== First round ====
Pos	Team	Pld	W	D	L	GF	GA	GD	Pts	Qualification or relegation
1	Grêmio	19	15	3	1	44	6	+38	33	Qualified;One extra point
2	Internacional	19	14	4	1	48	7	+41	32	
3	Juventude	19	11	6	2	31	12	+19	28	
4	Caxias	19	10	6	3	30	15	+15	26	
5	Esportivo	19	9	8	2	32	18	+14	26	
6	Novo Hamburgo	19	10	5	4	23	18	+5	25	
7	Brasil de Pelotas	19	9	6	4	17	11	+6	24	
8	14 de Julho	19	8	4	7	21	12	+9	20	
9	Internacional de Santa Maria	19	6	7	6	16	16	0	19	
10	São Paulo	19	6	5	8	19	18	+1	17	
11	Gaúcho	19	4	9	6	17	22	−5	17	
12	São Borja	19	6	4	9	15	20	−5	16	
13	Grêmio Bagé	19	6	2	11	16	31	−15	14	
14	Estrela	19	3	8	8	10	21	−11	14	
15	Guarany de Bagé	19	4	5	10	14	28	−14	13	
16	Pelotas	19	3	7	9	14	27	−13	13	
17	Farroupilha	19	3	7	9	20	35	−15	13	
18	Cachoeira	19	4	3	12	9	37	−28	11	
19	Avenida	19	3	4	12	17	38	−21	10	
20	Riograndense	19	3	3	13	15	36	−21	9	

Updated to match(es) played on May 13, 1979. Source: RSSSF.com
Rules for classification: 1) points; 2) wins; 3) goal difference; 4) number of goals scored.

==== Second round ====
Pos	Team	Pld	W	D	L	GF	GA	GD	Pts	Qualification or relegation
1	Grêmio	19	16	3	0	37	6	+31	35	Qualified;One extra point
2	Internacional	19	13	5	1	40	5	+35	31	
3	São Paulo	19	10	7	2	24	9	+15	27	
4	Gaúcho	19	10	6	3	21	12	+9	26	
5	Internacional de Santa Maria	19	9	6	4	19	7	+12	24	
6	Esportivo	19	8	7	4	15	11	+4	23	
7	Caxias	19	8	6	5	20	13	+7	22	
8	Juventude	19	7	7	5	21	15	+6	21	
9	Brasil de Pelotas	19	6	8	5	18	17	+1	20	
10	Pelotas	19	6	8	5	17	16	+1	20	
11	Farroupilha	19	6	8	5	18	21	−3	20	
12	14 de Julho	19	6	6	7	19	21	−2	18	
13	Novo Hamburgo	19	5	8	6	15	20	−5	18	
14	São Borja	19	4	5	10	13	27	−14	13	
15	Grêmio Bagé	19	3	7	9	4	12	−8	13	
16	Riograndense	19	5	2	12	16	38	−22	12	
17	Estrela	19	3	6	10	10	19	−9	12	
18	Guarany de Bagé	19	4	2	13	12	19	−7	10	
19	Avenida	19	4	2	13	18	41	−23	10	
20	Cachoeira	19	1	3	15	10	38	−28	5	

Updated to match(es) played on July 25, 1979. Source: RSSSF.com
Rules for classification: 1) points; 2) wins; 3) goal difference; 4) number of goals scored.

==== Final standings ====
Pos	Team	Pld	W	D	L	GF	GA	GD	Pts	Qualification or relegation
1	Grêmio	38	31	6	1	81	12	+69	68	Qualified
2	Internacional	38	27	9	2	88	12	+76	63	Qualified
3	Juventude	38	18	13	7	52	27	+25	49	Qualified
4	Esportivo	38	17	15	6	47	29	+18	49	Qualified
5	Caxias	38	18	12	8	50	28	+22	48	Qualified
6	São Paulo	38	16	12	10	43	27	+16	44	Qualified
7	Brasil de Pelotas	38	15	14	9	35	28	+7	44	Qualified
8	Novo Hamburgo	38	15	13	10	38	38	0	43	Qualified
9	Internacional de Santa Maria	38	15	13	10	35	23	+12	43	Relegation Tournament
10	Gaúcho	38	14	15	9	38	34	+4	43	Relegation Tournament
11	14 de Julho	38	14	10	14	40	33	+7	38	Relegation Tournament
12	Pelotas	38	9	15	14	31	43	−12	33	Relegation Tournament
13	Farroupilha	38	9	15	14	38	56	−18	33	Relegation Tournament
14	São Borja	38	10	9	19	28	47	−19	29	Relegation Tournament
15	Grêmio Bagé	38	9	9	20	20	43	−23	27	Relegation Tournament
16	Estrela	38	6	14	18	20	40	−20	26	Relegation Tournament
17	Guarany de Bagé	38	8	7	23	26	47	−21	23	Relegation Tournament
18	Riograndense	38	8	5	25	31	74	−43	21	Relegation Tournament
19	Avenida	38	7	6	25	35	79	−44	20	Relegation Tournament
20	Cachoeira	38	5	6	27	19	75	−56	16	Relegation Tournament

Updated to match(es) played on July 25, 1979. Source: RSSSF.com
Rules for classification: 1) points; 2) wins; 3) goal difference; 4) number of goals scored.

==== Extra point playoff ====
25 July 1979

Juventude	1–0	Esportivo
Cacau

Alfredo Jaconi, Caxias do Sul

=== Torneio de Descenso ===
==== Group A ====
Pos	Team	Pld	W	D	L	GF	GA	GD	Pts	Qualification or relegation
1	Pelotas	10	7	2	1	14	6	+8	16	
2	Grêmio Bagé	10	5	3	2	9	6	+3	13	
3	Internacional de Santa Maria	10	3	3	4	9	9	0	9	
4	Farroupilha	10	3	3	4	6	8	−2	9	
5	Guarany de Bagé	10	2	4	4	9	8	+1	8	
6	Cachoeira	10	2	1	7	7	17	−10	5	Relegation Playoffs

Updated to match(es) played on October 14, 1979. Source: sumulas-tche.blogspot.com
Rules for classification: 1) points; 2) wins; 3) goal difference; 4) number of goals scored.

==== Group B ====
Pos	Team	Pld	W	D	L	GF	GA	GD	Pts	Qualification or relegation
1	São Borja	10	5	5	0	12	5	+7	15	
2	Gaúcho	10	5	4	1	15	9	+6	14	
3	Riograndense	10	3	4	3	11	10	+1	10	
4	Estrela	10	2	5	3	9	8	+1	9	
5	Avenida	10	2	4	4	10	13	−3	8	
6	14 de Julho	10	2	0	8	3	15	−12	4	Relegation Playoffs

Updated to match(es) played on October 14, 1979. Source: sumulas-tche.blogspot.com
Rules for classification: 1) points; 2) wins; 3) goal difference; 4) number of goals scored.

==== Torneio da Morte ====
Semi-finals
Cachoeira	1	2	3
14 de Julho de Passo Fundo	0	0	0

Final
14 de Julho de Santana do Livramento (e)	2	1	3
Cachoeira	0	1	1

Key: * = Play-off winners, (a) = Wins because of away goals rule, (e) = Wins after extra time in second leg, (p) = Wins after penalty shoot-out.

===== Semifinals =====
21 October 1979

Cachoeira	1–0	14 de Julho de Passo Fundo
Neves 40'

Joaquim Vidal, Cachoeira do Sul
Referee: José Mocellin
25 October 1979

14 de Julho de Passo Fundo	0–2	Cachoeira
		Paulo Afonso 50'; Idelmiro 60'

Vermelhão da Serra, Passo Fundo
Referee: Leonel Antônio Pandolfo

Cachoeira advances; 14 de Julho de Passo Fundo relegated

===== Finals =====
9 December 1979

14 de Julho de Santana do Livramento	2–0	Cachoeira
Leopoldo 44', 77'

João Martins, Santana do Livramento
Referee: Ruy Silva Cañedo
16 December 1979

Cachoeira	1–1 (a.e.t.)	14 de Julho de Santana do Livramento
Badeco 70'		Tourinho 98'

Joaquim Vidal, Cachoeira do Sul
Referee: Zeno Escobar Barbosa

14 de Julho de Santana do Livramento promoted; Cachoeira relegated

=== Final phase ===
Pos	Team	Pld	W	D	L	GF	GA	GD	Pts	Qualification or relegation
1	Grêmio	14	11	3	0	26	3	+23	27	Champions;1980 Taça de Ouro
2	Esportivo	14	6	6	2	14	9	+5	18	
3	Internacional	14	7	3	4	18	8	+10	17	1980 Taça de Ouro
4	São Paulo	14	5	3	6	6	9	−3	13	1980 Taça de Ouro
5	Novo Hamburgo	14	4	4	6	8	19	−11	12	1980 Taça de Prata
6	Caxias	14	3	6	5	8	12	−4	12	1980 Taça de Prata
7	Brasil de Pelotas	14	3	4	7	8	15	−7	10	1980 Taça de Prata
8	Juventude	14	0	5	9	2	15	−13	6	1980 Taça de Prata

Updated to match(es) played on September 20, 1979. Source: RSSSF.com
Rules for classification: 1) points; 2) wins; 3) goal difference; 4) number of goals scored.
