= Clarel Kauer =

Brazilian footballer (1922–1993)

Clarel
Personal information
- Full name: Clarel Reynaldo Kauer
- Date of birth: 13 October 1922
- Place of birth: Montenegro, Brazil
- Date of death: 29 January 1993 (aged 70)
- Place of death: Porto Alegre, Brazil
- Position: Centre-back

Youth career
- Rosário

Senior career*
| Years | Team | Apps | (Gls) |
| 1939–1950 | Grêmio | | |
| 1951–1952 | Vasco da Gama | | |
| 1952–1953 | Grêmio | | |

Managerial career
- 1952: Grêmio (caretaker)
- * Club domestic league appearances and goals as of 21 May 2024

Clarel Reynaldo Kauer (13 October 1922 – 29 January 1993), simply known as Clarel, was a Brazilian professional footballer who played as a centre-back.

== Career ==
Defender of great technique, he played for Grêmio during the 1940s for most of his career. He also had a spell at CR Vasco da Gama, where he played in 1951 and 1952. Clarel returned to Grêmio to end his career, making a total of 251 appearances for the club.

== Honours ==
Grêmio

- Campeonato Gaúcho: 1946, 1949
- Campeonato Citadino de Porto Alegre: 1946, 1949
- Torneio Extra: 1948, 1949
