= Taquara =

Municipality of Rio Grande do Sul, Brazil

- Municipality
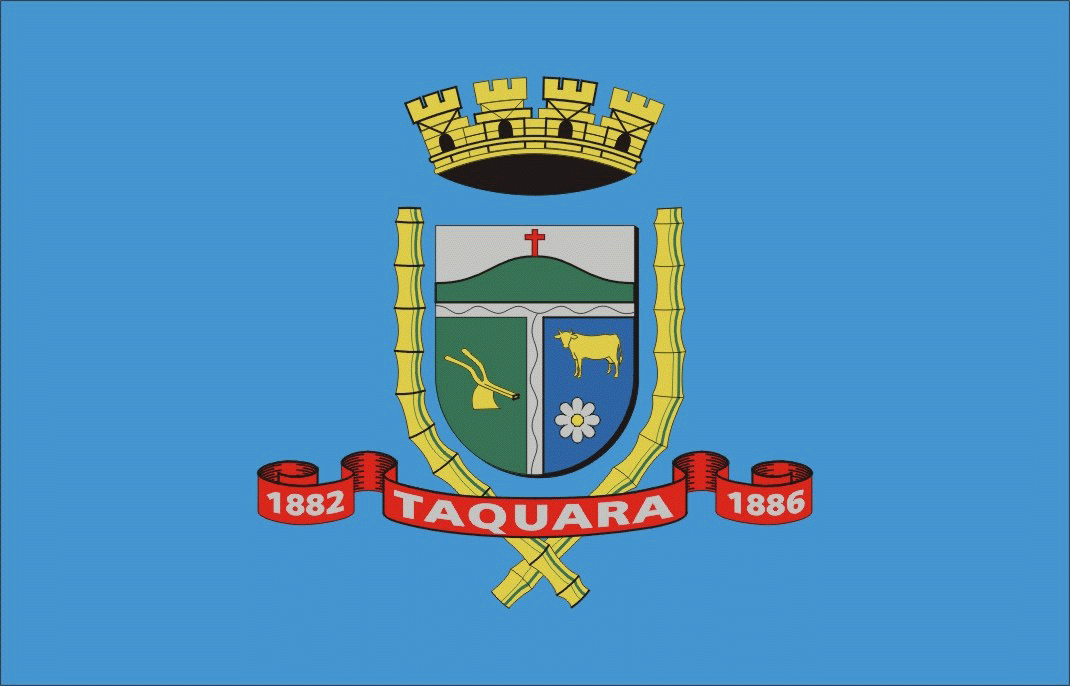
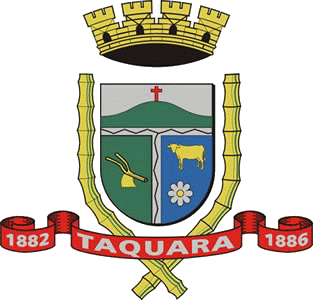
- Flag Coat of arms
- Motto: Um lugar para ficar (A place to stay)
- Taquara's location in the state of Rio Grande do Sul
- Coordinates: 29°39′02″S 50°46′50″W
- Country: Brazil
- State: Rio Grande do Sul
- Incorporated: April 17, 1886

Government
  - Type: Mayor
  - Mayor: Sirlei Teresinha Bernardes da Silveira
  - Deputy Mayor: Nelson Jose Martins

Area
  - Total: 480 km^{2} (190 sq mi)
- Elevation: 57 m (187 ft)

Population (2020)
  - Total: 57,584
- Time zone: UTC−3 (BRT)
- CEP (Post Code): 95600-000
- Website: taquara.com.br

Taquara is a municipality in Rio Grande do Sul, Brazil. Taquara is located 72 kilometers (44 miles) from Porto Alegre, the state capital. Taquara's population was estimated at 57,584 in 2020.

== See also ==
- List of municipalities in Rio Grande do Sul
