= Leanderson (footballer) =

Brazilian footballer (born 1982)

Personal information
- Full name: Leanderson Collonia Fraga
- Date of birth: 13 September 1982 (age 44)
- Place of birth: Porto Alegre, Brazil
- Height: 1.78 m (5 ft 10 in)
- Position: Midfielder

Youth career
- 1998–2002: Grêmio

Senior career*
Years	Team	Apps	(Gls)
2002–2004	Grêmio	76	(0)
2005	Sport Recife		
2006	Ceará		
2006–2007	Paços de Ferreira	4	(0)
2008–2009	Grêmio Barueri	19	(0)
2009	Juventude	17	(0)
2010–2012	Ipatinga	35	(0)
2011	→ Guarani (loan)	4	(0)
2013	Linense	9	(0)
2014	Treze	13	(1)
2015	Marcílio Dias	12	(1)
2016	Uniclinic	22	(2)
2017	ASA	29	(0)
2017	Cruzeiro-RS		
2018	São Paulo-RS	8	(0)
2018–2019	Ferroviário	40	(2)
2020	Floresta	7	(0)
- * Club domestic league appearances and goals as of 17 May 2024

Leanderson Collonia Fraga (born 13 September 1982), simply known as Leanderson, is a Brazilian former professional footballer who played as a midfielder.

== Career ==
Trained in the youth sectors of Grêmio, Leanderson played for the club professionally from 2002 to 2004. He then played for several teams in Brazil, with emphasis on Ceará football teams, Ceará SC where he was state champion in 2006, Ferroviário where he won Série D and Floresta where he ended his career in 2020.

== Personal life ==
Leanderson is son of the former footballer Jorge Leandro.

== Honours ==
Ceará

- Campeonato Cearense: 2006

Ferroviário

- Campeonato Brasileiro Série D: 2018
- Copa Fares Lopes: 2018

Grêmio U17

- Copa Santiago: 2000
