= Renato (footballer, born 1940) =

Brazilian footballer

Personal information
- Full name: Renato Pires da Silva
- Date of birth: 10 November 1940 (age 85)
- Place of birth: Porto Alegre, Brazil
- Position: Right-back

Youth career
- –1959: Grêmio

Senior career*
Years	Team	Apps	(Gls)
1959–1964	Grêmio		
1965–1968	São Paulo	120	(11)
1968–1970	Grêmio		
1970–1971	Cruzeiro		
- * Club domestic league appearances and goals as of 3 September 2023

Renato Pires da Silva (born 10 November 1940), simply known as Renato or by the nickname Jacaré, is a Brazilian former professional footballer who played as a right-back.

== Career ==
Renato started his career at Grêmio, where he won all his titles as a professional player. He made a total of 149 appearances and 11 goals for the club.

At São Paulo FC, he did not win titles, but he was the club's official penalty taker, where he stood out for running with his back to the goalkeeper and turning just before kicking the ball.

== Honours ==
=== Grêmio ===
- Campeonato Citadino de Porto Alegre: 1959, 1964
- Campeonato Gaúcho: 1962, 1963, 1964
