= Beto Bacamarte =

Brazilian footballer

Personal information
- Full name: Mauro Pinto
- Date of birth: 26 February 1948 (age 78)
- Place of birth: Rio Pardo, Brazil
- Position: Centre-back

Youth career
- 1966: Caxias
- 1967–1968: Grêmio

Senior career*
Years	Team	Apps	(Gls)
1969–1976	Grêmio	335	(4)
1976	Flamengo	9	(0)
1977–1978	América Mineiro		
1979	Bagé		
1981	Estanciano		
- * Club domestic league appearances and goals as of 7 January 2024

Mauro Pinto (born 26 February 1948), better known as Beto Bacamarte, is a Brazilian former professional footballer who played as a centre-back.

== Career ==
Beto Bacamarte was a defender for Grêmio FBPA during the first part of the 1970s, a period of the club's title drought. He made 335 appearances in total. In 1972 he was elected Silver Ball. Bacamarte also had a brief spell at Flamengo in the second round of the Campeonato Carioca, and played for América Mineiro, Bagé and Estânciano-SE.

== Honours ==
Individual

- 1972 Bola de Prata
