= Geada =

Brazilian footballer

Personal information
- Full name: Breno Steffen
- Date of birth: 6 May 1921
- Place of birth: Campo Bom, Brazil
- Date of death: 6 January 2006 (aged 84)
- Place of death: Novo Hamburgo, Brazil
- Position: Forward

Youth career
- 15 de Novembro

Senior career*
Years	Team	Apps	(Gls)
1937–1941	15 de Novembro		
1942–1948	Esperança		
1948–1952	Grêmio	158	(93)
1953–1958	Floriano		
- * Club domestic league appearances and goals as of 21 May 2024

Breno Steffen (6 May 1921 – 6 January 2006), better known as Geada, was a Brazilian professional footballer who played as a forward.

== Career ==
A goalscoring center forward, Geada started his career in 15 de Campo Bom at just 16 years old. He also played for Esperança de Novo Hamburgo and Grêmio, where he made 158 appearances and scored 93 goals. He ended his career at Floriano, currently EC Novo Hamburgo, and is considered one of the greatest players in the club's history.

== Honours ==
Grêmio

- Campeonato Gaúcho: 1949
- Campeonato Citadino de Porto Alegre: 1949
- Torneio Extra: 1948, 1949

== Death ==
Geada died in Novo Hamburgo, 6 January 2006, aged 84.
