= Paulo Souza (footballer) =

Brazilian footballer

Personal information
- Full name: Paulo Muratore de Souza
- Date of birth: 25 April 1944
- Place of birth: Caxias do Sul, Brazil
- Date of death: 15 March 2006 (aged 61)
- Place of death: Porto Alegre, Brazil
- Position: Centre-back

Senior career*
Years	Team	Apps	(Gls)
1964–1965	Metropol		
1965–1970	Grêmio	129	(0)
1970–1971	Juventus-SC		
1972	Pontagrossense		
1973–1974	Santa Cruz-RS		
1974	Novo Hamburgo		
1975–1976	São José		
- * Club domestic league appearances and goals as of 20 May 2024

Paulo Muratore de Souza (25 April 1944 – 15 March 2006), simply known as Paulo Souza, was a Brazilian professional footballer who played as a centre-back.

== Career ==
A defender with good technique, Paulo Souza played for Grêmio during the 1960s, making 129 appearances for the club.

== Personal life ==
Paulo is brother of the also footballer Cléo, with whom he played side by side at Grêmio on several occasions.

== Honours ==
Grêmio

- Campeonato Gaúcho: 1965, 1966, 1967, 1968
- Campeonato Citadino de Porto Alegre: 1965
