= Oberdan Vilaín =

Brazilian footballer

Oberdan
Personal information
- Full name: Oberdan Nazareno Vilaín
- Date of birth: 2 June 1945 (age 81)
- Place of birth: Florianópolis, Brazil
- Height: 1.89 m (6 ft 2 in)
- Position: Centre-back

Senior career*
| Years | Team | Apps | (Gls) |
| 1963–1965 | Coritiba | | |
| 1965–1975 | Santos | 344 | (8) |
| 1970 | → Coritiba (loan) | | |
| 1973–1974 | → Coritiba (loan) | | |
| 1975–1976 | Coritiba | | |
| 1977–1978 | Grêmio | 74 | (13) |

Managerial career
- 1980: Grêmio
- * Club domestic league appearances and goals as of 18 May 2024

Oberdan Nazareno Vilaín (born 2 June 1945), simply known as Oberdan Vilaín or Oberdan, is a Brazilian former professional footballer who played as a centre-back.

== Career ==
Having only worn the shirts of Coritiba, Santos and, Grêmio in his career, Oberdan is considered an idol of the three clubs. He won several titles alongside Pelé at Santos FC, and at Coritiba, where he started his career, he was a three-time state champion. He ended his career at Grêmio, being appointed to the club's hall of fame.

== Managerial career ==
Oberdan had only one experience as a coach in 1980, with Grêmio. He managed the club for 22 matches. At the time, Valdir Espinosa was his assistant.

== Personal life ==
After retiring, Oberdan founded a mineral water bottling company.

== Honours ==
Santos

- Intercontinental Supercup: 1968
- Taça Brasil: 1968
- Torneio Rio-São Paulo: 1966
- Campeonato Paulista: 1965, 1967, 1968, 1969, 1973

Coritiba

- Torneio do Povo: 1973
- Campeonato Paranaense: 1974, 1975, 1976

Grêmio

- Campeonato Gaúcho: 1977
