= Jurandir (footballer, born 1951) =

Brazilian footballer

Personal information
- Full name: Jurandir de Andrade Arrué
- Date of birth: 11 September 1951
- Place of birth: Porto Alegre, Brazil
- Date of death: 26 June 2019 (aged 67)
- Place of death: Porto Alegre, Brazil
- Position: Left winger

Senior career*
| Years | Team | Apps | (Gls) |
| 1971–1974 | Novo Hamburgo | | |
| 1975–1978 | Caxias | | |
| 1978–1981 | Grêmio | 117 | (12) |
| 1982 | Águila | | |
| 1982–1983 | Bahia | | |
| 1983–1984 | Brasil de Pelotas | | |
| 1985–1986 | Inter de Lages | | |
| 1986 | Avaí | | |
| 1987 | Hercílio Luz | | |
| 1988 | Bagé | | |
- * Club domestic league appearances and goals

Jurandir de Andrade Arrué (11 September 1951 – 26 June 2019), simply known as Jurandir, was a Brazilian former professional footballer who played as a left winger.

== Career ==
Jurandir stood out for his physical vigor and marking ability, something rare for Brazilian wingers at the time. He started his career at EC Novo Hamburgo and played for SER Caxias before arriving at Grêmio in 1978, where he was state champion twice and Brazilian champion. He fought historic duels against Paulo Roberto Falcão, playing 112 matches for the club. He also played for CD Águila from El Salvador and other clubs in the southern region.

== Honours ==
Grêmio

- Campeonato Brasileiro: 1981
- Campeonato Gaúcho: 1979, 1980

== Death ==
Jurandir died on 26 June 2019 at Santa Clara Hospital, Porto Alegre, victim of liver cancer.
