= Yura (footballer) =

Brazilian footballer

Personal information
- Full name: Júlio Titow
- Date of birth: 4 November 1952 (age 73)
- Place of birth: Porto Alegre, Brazil
- Position: Midfielder

Youth career
- Itapeva (Porto Alegre)

Senior career*
Years	Team	Apps	(Gls)
1971–1980	Grêmio	359	(62)
1980–1981	Criciúma		
- * Club domestic league appearances and goals as of 19 May 2024

Júlio Titow (born 4 November 1952), better known as Yura, is a Brazilian former professional footballer who played as a midfielder.

== Career ==
Son of Russian immigrants, Yura played for Grêmio FBPA from 1971 to 1980, making 359 appearances and scoring 62 goals, was state champion twice and included in the club's hall of fame. He still played for Criciúma EC before retiring due to a serious injury, in 1980 and 1981.

== Personal life ==
His son, known as Yurinha, is a women's football manager.

== Honours ==
Grêmio

- Campeonato Gaúcho: 1977, 1979
