= Vilson Cereja =

Brazilian footballer

Personal information
- Full name: Vilson Cereja
- Date of birth: 20 March 1955 (age 71)
- Place of birth: Porto Alegre, Brazil
- Position: Defender

Youth career
- –1974: Grêmio

Senior career*
Years	Team	Apps	(Gls)
1975–1979	Grêmio	256	(26)
1980	Coritiba		
1981	Sport Recife		
1982–1984	Náutico		
1985–1987	Inter de Limeira		
1988	Independente-SP		
1989	ABC		
1990–1992	Central		
- * Club domestic league appearances and goals as of 18 May 2024

Vilson Cereja (born 20 March 1955), also known by the nickname Vilson Cavalo, is a Brazilian former professional footballer who played as a defender.

== Career ==
Trained in Grêmio youth sectors, Vilson played in more than one position in defense. He was state champion in 1977 and 1979, and for Grêmio FBPA he made 256 appearances, scoring 26 goals. He was also champion in 1984 at Náutico and in the historic Inter de Limeira title in 1986. He ended his career at Central in 1992, and later worked as a coach for young sectors at teams from Pernambuco state.

== Honours ==
Grêmio

- Campeonato Gaúcho: 1977, 1979

Náutico

- Campeonato Pernambucano: 1984

Inter de Limeira

- Campeonato Paulista: 1986
- Taça dos Campeões Estaduais Rio-São Paulo: 1986
