= Alcino (footballer) =

Brazilian footballer

Personal information
- Full name: Alcino Neves dos Santos Filho
- Date of birth: 24 March 1951
- Place of birth: Rio de Janeiro, Brazil
- Date of death: 20 July 2006 (aged 55)
- Place of death: Belém, Brazil
- Height: 1.91 m (6 ft 3 in)
- Position: Forward

Youth career
- Madureira

Senior career*
Years	Team	Apps	(Gls)
1969–1970	Madureira		
1971	Olaria		
1971–1975	Remo		(158)
1976	Grêmio	48	(28)
1977–1981	Portuguesa	80	(21)
1979–1980	→ Atlético Goianiense (loan)		
1980	→ Inter de Limeira (loan)		
1981	→ Bangu (loan)		
1981–1982	Paysandu		
1982	Santa Cruz		
1982	Rio Negro-AM		
1983	Marília		
1983	Sampaio Corrêa		
1983–1984	América de Natal		
1984	Rio Negro-AM		
1984–1985	Campo Grande-RJ		
1985	Villa Nova		
1986	Uberaba		
1989	Independente-PA		
1990	Pinheirense		
- * Club domestic league appearances and goals as of 2 November 2025

Alcino Neves dos Santos Filho (24 March 1951 – 20 July 2006), simply known as Alcino, was a Brazilian professional footballer who played as forward.

== Career ==
As a young boy, Alcino passed trials in Flamengo's youth teams, but due to his mother's poor health, he left the club. He returned to football in 1969. Due to his good height, he stood out for the goals he scored with headers. In 1970 he was transferred to Olaria, but he didn't adapt to the club and was transferred again, this time to Remo.

There, Alcino experienced the best phase of his career, becoming the second highest scorer of all time with 158 goals, winning three state championships, and delivering several outstanding performances in the Brazilian Championship, such as against Flamengo in 1974.

In 1976 he transferred to Grêmio, where he was state runner-up and top scorer with 17 goals. In 1977 he transferred to Portuguesa, where he achieved great success, until in 1979 he was caught in a doping test for using an appetite suppressant. He ended up being loaned to Atlético Goianiense, Inter de Limeira, and Bangu until the end of his contract with Portuguesa. In 1981 he signed with Paysandu but did not repeat the success he had at Remo, scoring only one goal for the club. Already facing problems with alcoholism, he began to move from club to club. In 1983, in the city of Manaus during his spell at Atlético Rio Negro, possibly drunk, he drove the club's bus, running over and killing a person. He earned the infamous nickname "Motora," an abbreviation in Portuguese for driver. He ended his career in 1990 playing for Pinheirense in the state championship.

== Honours ==
Individual

- Campeonato Paraense top scorer: 1973, 1974, 1975

== Death ==
Alcino died on 20 July 2006 in Belém, Pará, from liver cancer.
