= André Catimba =

Brazilian footballer (1946–2021)

Personal information
- Full name: Carlos André Avelino de Lima
- Date of birth: 30 October 1946
- Place of birth: Salvador, Brazil
- Date of death: 28 July 2021 (aged 74)
- Position: Forward

Senior career*
| Years | Team | Apps | (Gls) |
- EC Ypiranga
- Vitória
- Guarani
- Grêmio
- Argentinos Juniors
- * Club domestic league appearances and goals

Carlos André Avelino de Lima, known as André Catimba (30 October 1946 – 28 July 2021) was a Brazilian professional footballer who played as a forward for EC Ypiranga, Vitória, Guarani, Grêmio and Argentinos Juniors.
