= 1973 Campeonato Paulista =

Campeonato Paulista – Série A1
- Season: 1973
- Champions: Portuguesa (3rd title); Santos (13th title)
- Campeonato Nacional: Palmeiras; Corinthians; São Paulo; Portuguesa; Santos; Guarani
- Matches played: 264
- Goals scored: 533 (2.02 per match)
- Top goalscorer: Pelé (Santos) – 11 goals
- Biggest home win: Santos 6-0 Juventus (April 4, 1973)
- Biggest away win: São Bento 1-4 América (November 12, 1972)
- Highest scoring: Palmeiras 6-1 São Bento (April 18, 1973)

The 1973 Campeonato Paulista da Divisão Especial de Futebol Profissional, organized by the Federação Paulista de Futebol, was the 72nd season of São Paulo's top professional football league. Portuguesa and Santos split the title, with the former winning it for the 3rd time and the latter for the 13th. No teams were relegated. Santos' Pelé was the top scorer, with 11 goals.

== Championship ==
Much like in the previous year, a preliminary phase was disputed before the championship proper, in which all teams played against each other twice and the six best teams qualified into the main championship. That phase was to be disputed in the second semester of 1972, by the teams that had been eliminated in that phase in the previous year and the six worst-placed teams in the main championship

The championship proper was divided into two rounds, in which each team played against each other once, and the winner of each round qualified to the Finals.

=== Preliminary round ===
==== League table ====
Pos	Team	Pld	W	D	L	GF	GA	GD	Pts	Qualification or relegation
1	Ponte Preta	22	12	6	4	31	19	+12	30	Qualified
2	América	22	7	14	1	31	13	+18	28	Qualified
3	Juventus	22	9	9	4	26	20	+6	27	Qualified
4	Botafogo	22	12	2	8	29	20	+9	26	Qualified
5	São Bento	22	10	5	7	28	21	+7	25	Qualified
6	Ferroviária	22	8	9	5	20	15	+5	25	Qualified
7	Comercial	21	8	6	7	21	23	−2	22 (Note: The result in the December 14 match between Comercial and XV de Piracicaba is not known)	Eliminated
8	Marília	22	7	8	7	17	24	−7	22	Eliminated
9	Portuguesa Santista	22	7	4	11	20	31	−11	18	Eliminated
10	XV de Piracicaba	21	6	4	11	16	23	−7	16	Eliminated
11	Noroeste	22	4	6	12	15	25	−10	14	Eliminated
12	Paulista	22	1	7	14	19	39	−20	9	Eliminated

Updated to match(es) played on December 17, 1972. Source: Brfut.blogspot.com Brfut.blogspot.com
Rules for classification: 1) points; 2) goal difference; 3) wins; 4) number of goals scored.

===== Results =====
Home \ Away	AME	BOT	COM	FER	JUV	MAR	NOR	PAU	PON	AAP	SBO	XVP
América	—	1–1	3–0	0–0	0–0	1–1	0–0	4–2	1–1	5–0	3–0	2–0
Botafogo	1–1	—	1–0	2–0	1–2	5–0	2–1	1–0	2–1	1–0	1–0	1–0
Comercial	1–1	1–0	—	3–2	3–1	1–0	0–0	1–1	0–1	3–2	1–0	?
Ferroviária	1–2	1–0	0–0	—	1–1	3–0	1–0	2–0	0–0	1–0	1–1	2–1
Juventus	1–1	0–1	1–1	2–1	—	0–0	2–1	2–0	1–1	3–2	1–0	1–1
Marília	0–0	1–0	2–1	1–1	2–1	—	1–0	4–1	1–0	2–1	0–0	0–0
Noroeste	0–0	1–3	0–1	0–0	0–0	2–0	—	2–1	0–1	4–0	0–2	0–1
Paulista	1–1	0–2	3–1	0–1	0–2	1–1	2–2	—	1–2	1–2	0–1	2–2
Ponte Preta	0–0	3–2	3–1	1–1	1–1	1–0	3–0	3–1	—	1–0	3–2	1–0
Portuguesa Santista	0–0	3–2	0–0	1–0	1–2	2–0	2–0	0–0	2–1	—	0–0	2–1
São Bento	1–4	2–0	2–1	0–0	2–1	2–0	3–0	2–2	3–1	2–0	—	2–0
XV de Piracicaba	2–1	2–0	0–1	0–1	0–1	1–1	0–2	1–0	0–2	2–0	2–1	—

Updated to match(es) played on December 17, 1972. Source: Brfut.blogspot.com Brfut.blogspot.com
Legend: Blue = home team win; Yellow = draw; Red = away team win.

=== First round ===
==== League table ====
Pos	Team	Pld	W	D	L	GF	GA	GD	Pts	Qualification or relegation
1	Santos	11	8	3	0	23	5	+18	19	Qualified to the Finals
2	Palmeiras	11	7	4	0	24	10	+14	18	
3	Guarani	11	7	1	3	13	8	+5	15	
4	Corinthians	11	5	4	2	12	5	+7	14	
5	São Paulo	11	4	5	2	12	9	+3	13	
6	América	11	4	3	4	12	10	+2	11	
7	Ponte Preta	11	3	5	3	12	13	−1	11	
8	Portuguesa	11	2	6	3	11	12	−1	10	
9	Ferroviária	11	2	2	7	8	15	−7	6	
10	São Bento	11	2	2	7	4	18	−14	6	
11	Juventus	11	0	5	6	6	19	−13	5	
12	Botafogo	11	1	2	8	13	26	−13	4	

Updated to match(es) played on May 20, 1973. Source: RSSSF.com
Rules for classification: 1) points; 2) goal difference; 3) wins; 4) number of goals scored.

==== Results ====
Home \ Away	AME	BOT	COR	FER	GUA	JUV	PAL	PON	POR	SAN	SBO	SPO
América	—	4–2				1–1		1–1			3–0	
Botafogo		—		0–2		1–1			1–3	1–2		3–1
Corinthians	0–1	0–0	—			2–0	1–1		1–0		4–0	
Ferroviária	0–1		0–2	—	0–1		2–4	0–1				
Guarani	2–0	2–1	0–2		—	1–0		2–0		0–1		1–0
Juventus				1–2		—		0–2				
Palmeiras	1–0	4–2			2–1	2–1	—		2–0	1–1	6–1	0–0
Ponte Preta		5–1	0–0				1–1	—	0–0		0–0	
Portuguesa	1–1			2–2	2–2	1–1			—		1–0	
Santos	1–0		3–0	0–0		6–0		5–1	1–0	—	1–0	
São Bento		2–1		1–0	0–1	0–0					—	0–1
São Paulo	1–0		0–0	2–0		1–1		3–1	1–1	2–2		—

Updated to match(es) played on May 20, 1973. Source: RSSSF.com
Legend: Blue = home team win; Yellow = draw; Red = away team win.

=== Second round ===
==== League table ====
Pos	Team	Pld	W	D	L	GF	GA	GD	Pts	Qualification or relegation
1	Portuguesa	11	7	4	0	15	3	+12	18	Qualified to the Finals
2	Corinthians	11	5	4	2	17	10	+7	14	
3	Juventus	11	4	5	2	9	4	+5	13	
4	Guarani	11	3	7	1	11	7	+4	13	
5	Santos	11	4	4	3	8	6	+2	12	
6	Palmeiras	11	2	8	1	9	8	+1	12	
7	Ponte Preta	11	4	4	3	5	6	−1	12	
8	América	11	4	3	4	8	10	−2	11	
9	Ferroviária	11	3	5	3	8	10	−2	11	
10	São Paulo	11	2	4	5	10	11	−1	8	
11	Botafogo	11	2	4	5	7	11	−4	8	
12	São Bento	11	0	0	11	3	24	−21	0	

Updated to match(es) played on September 4, 1973. Source: RSSSF.com
Rules for classification: 1) points; 2) goal difference; 3) wins; 4) number of goals scored.

==== Results ====
Home \ Away	AME	BOT	COR	FER	GUA	JUV	PAL	PON	POR	SAN	SBO	SPO
América	—		2–1	1–1	0–2		1–1		0–2	0–1		2–1
Botafogo	1–0	—	0–2		1–1		0–0	0–0			3–0	
Corinthians			—	3–1	1–1		1–1	3–0	0–2		3–1	2–1
Ferroviária		1–1		—		1–0			0–0	1–1	1–0	1–0
Guarani				2–0	—		1–1	0–0	1–1		1–0	
Juventus	0–0	1–0	0–0		1–1	—	0–0			0–0	5–0	
Palmeiras				1–1			—	0–0	0–2			
Ponte Preta	0–1			1–0		0–1		—		2–1		
Portuguesa		2–0				2–0		0–0	—	1–0		1–1
Santos		2–0	1–1		1–0		0–1			—		
São Bento	0–1						1–3	0–1	1–2	0–1	—	
São Paulo		2–1			1–1	0–1	1–1			0–0	3–0	—

Updated to match(es) played on September 4, 1973. Source: RSSSF.com
Legend: Blue = home team win; Yellow = draw; Red = away team win.

=== Finals ===
The finals would be disputed in an only match, with extra time in case of a tie, and penalties if the tie persisted. However, after Portuguesa's third shot, when Santos led by 2–0, referee Armando Marques mistakenly sounded the whistle, even though there were still two shots left for each team, and there was still the possibility of Portuguesa tying. When the referee realized his mistake, Portuguesa's players had already left the stadium, and in the very same night, the Federation proclaimed both clubs to have won the title.

26 August 1973

Santos	0–0 (a.e.t.)	Portuguesa
Penalties
Zé Carlos (penalty missed); Carlos Alberto (penalty scored); Edu (penalty scored)	2–0	Isidoro (penalty missed); Calegari (penalty missed); Wilsinho (penalty missed)

Morumbi, São Paulo (SP)
Attendance: 116,156
Referee: Armando Marques

== Top Scores ==
Rank	Player	Club	Goals
1	Pelé	Santos	11
2	César Maluco	Palmeiras	8
2	Ademir da Guia	Palmeiras	8
4	Brecha	Santos	6
4	Euzébio	Santos	6
