= Tarciso =

Brazilian footballer (1954–2018)

José Tarciso de Souza (15 September 1954 – 5 December 2018), known as simply Tarciso, was a Brazilian professional footballer who played as a right winger for clubs in Brazil and Paraguay.

== Career ==
Tarciso led Cerro Porteño to the 1987 Paraguayan Primera División title.

== Teams ==
- América-RJ 1969–1973
- Grêmio 1973–1986
- Criciúma 1986
- Goiás 1986
- Cerro Porteño 1987–1988
- Coritiba 1988–1989
- Goiânia 1992–1994
- São José-PA 1994
