= Estádio Centenário =

Coordinates: 29°09′54″S 51°11′48″W

Estádio Francisco Stédile
- Estádio Centenário
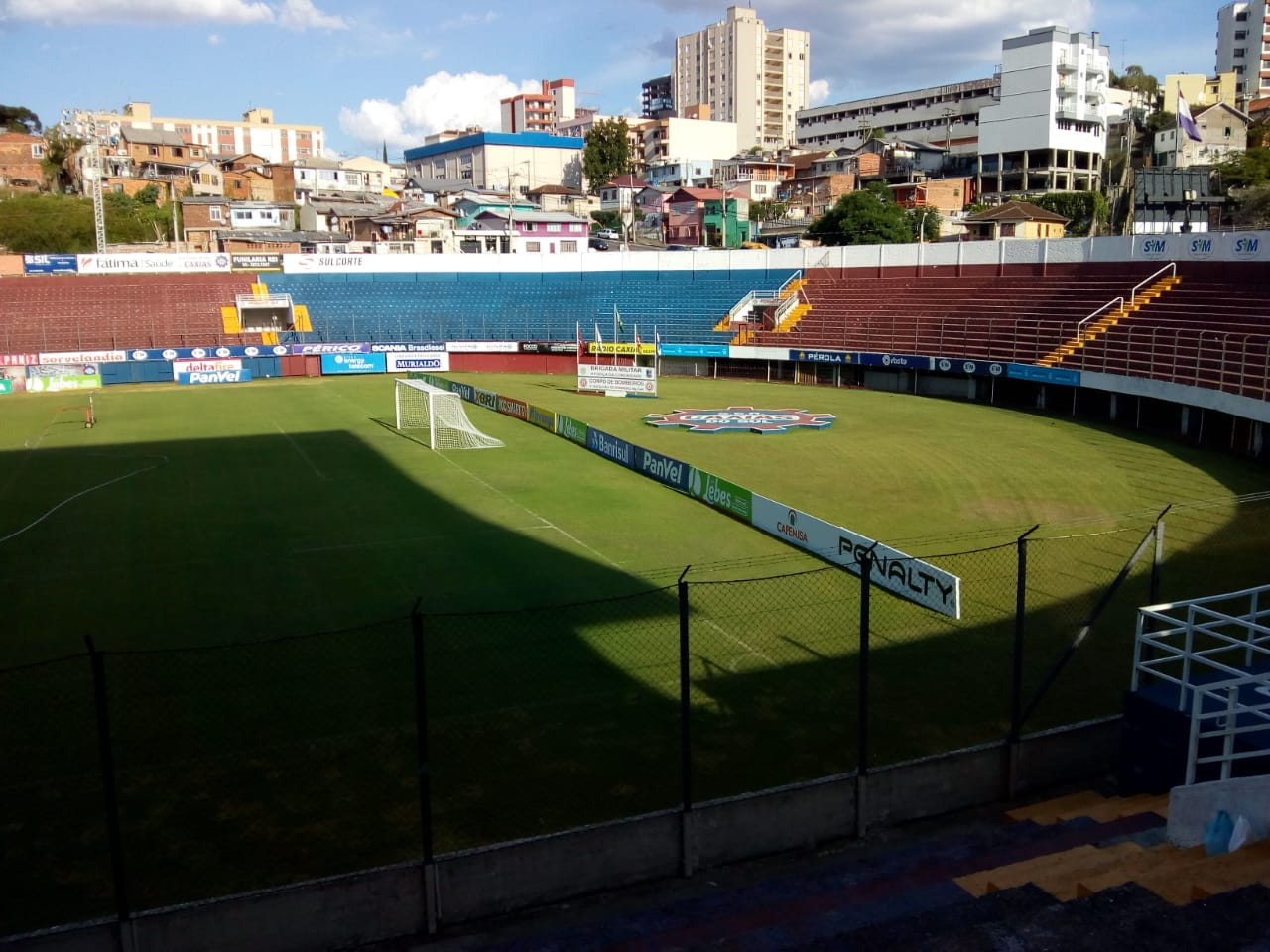
- Sisbrace
- Interactive map of Estádio Francisco Stédile
- Location: Caxias do Sul, Rio Grande do Sul, Brazil
- Capacity: 22,132 people.
- Surface: Grass

Construction
- Opened: 12 September 1976

Tenants
- Caxias; Internacional (2013–2014)

The Estádio Francisco Stédile, usually known as the Estádio Centenário, is a multi-use stadium in Caxias do Sul, Brazil. It is currently used mostly for football matches. The stadium has a capacity of 30,802 people. It was built in 1976. The stadium was named after Francisco Stédile, who was Caxias' president during its construction. The stadium is nicknamed Centenário because it honors the centennial anniversary of the Italian colonization of Rio Grande do Sul.

== History ==
The stadium was built in the place where was located Caxias' previous stadium, named Estádio Baixada Rubra. Estádio Centenário's construction finished six months after its start. The stadium was built because Caxias was allowed to dispute the 1976 Campeonato Brasileiro Série A.

The inaugural match was played on September 12, 1976, when Caxias beat Internacional 2–1. The first goal of the stadium was scored by Caxias' Osmar.

The stadium's attendance record currently stands at 30,000 people, set on August 16, 2009, when Caxias and Guaratinguetá drew 1-1.
