= Estádio Bento Freitas =

Multi-use stadium in Pelotas, Brazil

Coordinates: 31°46′15″S 52°19′57″W

Estádio Bento Mendes de Freitas
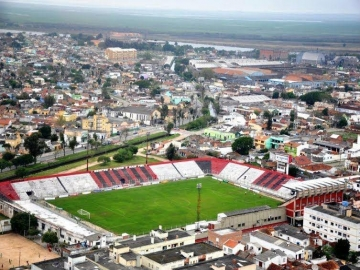
- Sisbrace
- Interactive map of Estádio Bento Mendes de Freitas
- Full name: Estádio Bento Mendes de Freitas
- Location: Pelotas, Rio Grande do Sul, Brazil
- Owner: Grêmio Esportivo Brasil
- Capacity: 18,000
- Surface: Grass

Construction
- Opened: May 23, 1943

Tenant
- Grêmio Esportivo Brasil

Estádio Bento Mendes de Freitas is a multi-use stadium located in Pelotas, Brazil. It is used mostly for football matches and hosts the home matches of Grêmio Esportivo Brasil. The stadium has a maximum capacity of 18,000 people and was built in 1943. It is owned by Grêmio Esportivo Brasil, and is named after Bento da Silva Freitas, who was Grêmio Esportivo Brasil's president during the stadium construction.

== History ==
It was built in 1943, and inaugurated on May 23 of that year. The inaugural match was played on that day, when Força e Luz beat GE Brasil 3–2. The first goal of the stadium was scored by GE Brasil's Birilão.

The stadium's attendance record currently stands at 20,115, set on March 21, 1984, when GE Brasil beat Flamengo 1–0.

== See also ==
- List of football stadiums in Brazil
- Lists of stadiums
