= Sociedade Esportiva São Borja =

São Borja
- Full name: Sociedade Esportiva São Borja
- Nickname(s): Bugre Missioneiro
- Founded: 14 January 1977; 48 years ago
- Ground: Vicente Goulart, São Borja, Brazil
- Capacity: 8,000
- League: Campeonato Gaúcho Série B
- Website: http://www.sesaoborja.com.br/
Home colors	Away colors

Sociedade Esportiva São Borja, also known as São Borja or SE São Borja, is a Brazilian football team in São Borja, Rio Grande do Sul.

== History ==
The club came up with the name of Sociedade Esportiva São Borja, being derived from the fusion of International and Cruzeiro, two traditional teams vied in the city and went through financial difficulties. Theirs São Borja inherited colors (International red and blue Cruzeiro). The merger aimed to unite the population to support and strengthen football in São Borja, and started using the stadium Vicente Goulart.

Already in its first year the São Borja played in the first division of the Campeonato Gaúcho, keeping it continuously for 11 years (1977 to 1987), reaching the final stage of the competition on three occasions: 1980, 1981, 1983.

In the 1981 Campeonato Brasileiro Série C, the São Borja reached the 3rd stage of the competition, finishing the race in 5th place.

In the 1987 Campeonato Gaúcho the team was ranked 14th (last) and was relegated to the Campeonato Gaúcho Série A2.

In 1997, São Borja returned to the first division playing the Campeonato Gaúcho Série A2, at the time the First Division was divided into two series. The team entered in one of the vacancies left by Aimoré and Atlético Carazinho who had been licensed. But the San Borja has to stay in last place (14th in Serie B) and was demoted.

After this tournament the club graduated from professional football for 15 years, returning in 2012 with the name of Associação Esportiva São Borja and disputing the Campeonato Gaúcho Série A2, which finished in 11th place.

In 2015 the club graduated again with the name Sociedade Esportiva São Borja.

== Honours ==
- Copa Governador do Estado
  - Runners-up (1): 1980
- Campeonato Gaúcho Série B
  - Winners (1): 2018
- Copa ACEG
  - Winners (1): 1985

== Players ==
As of 6 March 2016.

Note: Flags indicate national team as defined under FIFA eligibility rules; some limited exceptions apply. Players may hold more than one non-FIFA nationality.

No. / Pos. / Nation / Player	No. / Pos. / Nation / Player
