= Estádio Santa Rosa =

Coordinates: 29°40′44″S 51°8′7″W

- Interactive map of Estádio Santa Rosa
- Location: Novo Hamburgo, Brazil
- Capacity: 17,000

Tenant
- Esporte Clube Novo Hamburgo

Estádio Santa Rosa was a multi-use stadium located in Novo Hamburgo, Brazil. It was used mostly for football matches and hosts the home matches of Esporte Clube Novo Hamburgo. The stadium had a maximum capacity of 17,000 people.
