= Santa Cruz do Sul University Private Natural Heritage Reserve =

Private Reserve of Natural Heritage of University of Santa Cruz do Sul
- IUCN category IV (habitat/species management area)
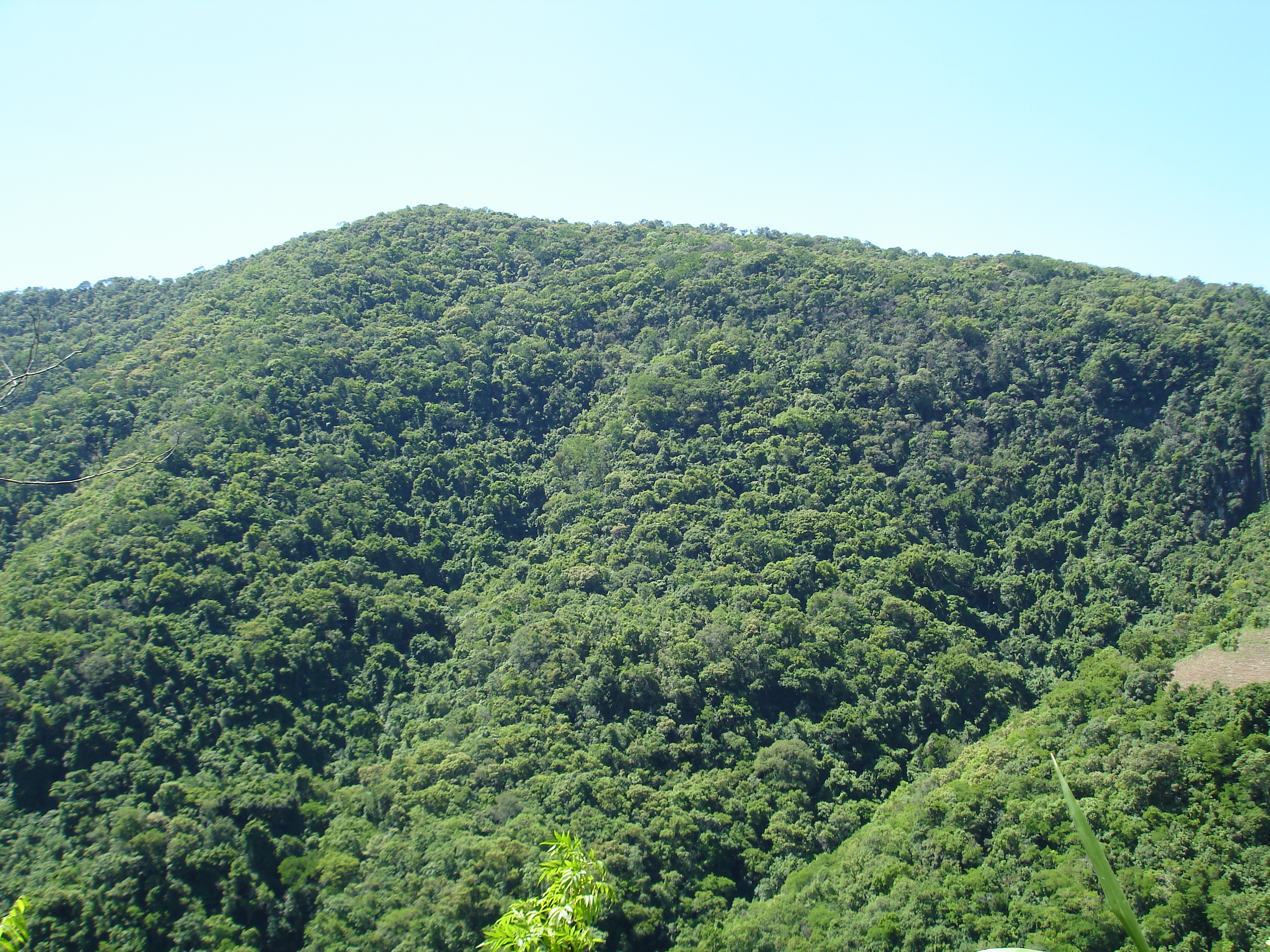
- View of the seasonal deciduous forest.
- Interactive map of Private Reserve of Natural Heritage of University of Santa Cruz do Sul
- Location: Sinimbu
- Coordinates: 29°23′00″S 52°32′00″W
- Area: 221.39 ha (547.1 acres)
- Established: March 18, 2009
- Governing body: Owned by Associação Pró-ensino de Santa Cruz do Sul and operated by ICMBio

The Private Reserve of Natural Heritage (RPPN) of University of Santa Cruz do Sul (Unisc) is a protected area created in 2009, through Ordinance nº 16, of March 18, having an area of 221,39 hectares, being nowadays one of the largest protected area of this category (RPPN) in Rio Grande do Sul state, Brazil. This preservation area is within the Atlantic Forest Biome and the predominant vegetation is the seasonal deciduous forest.

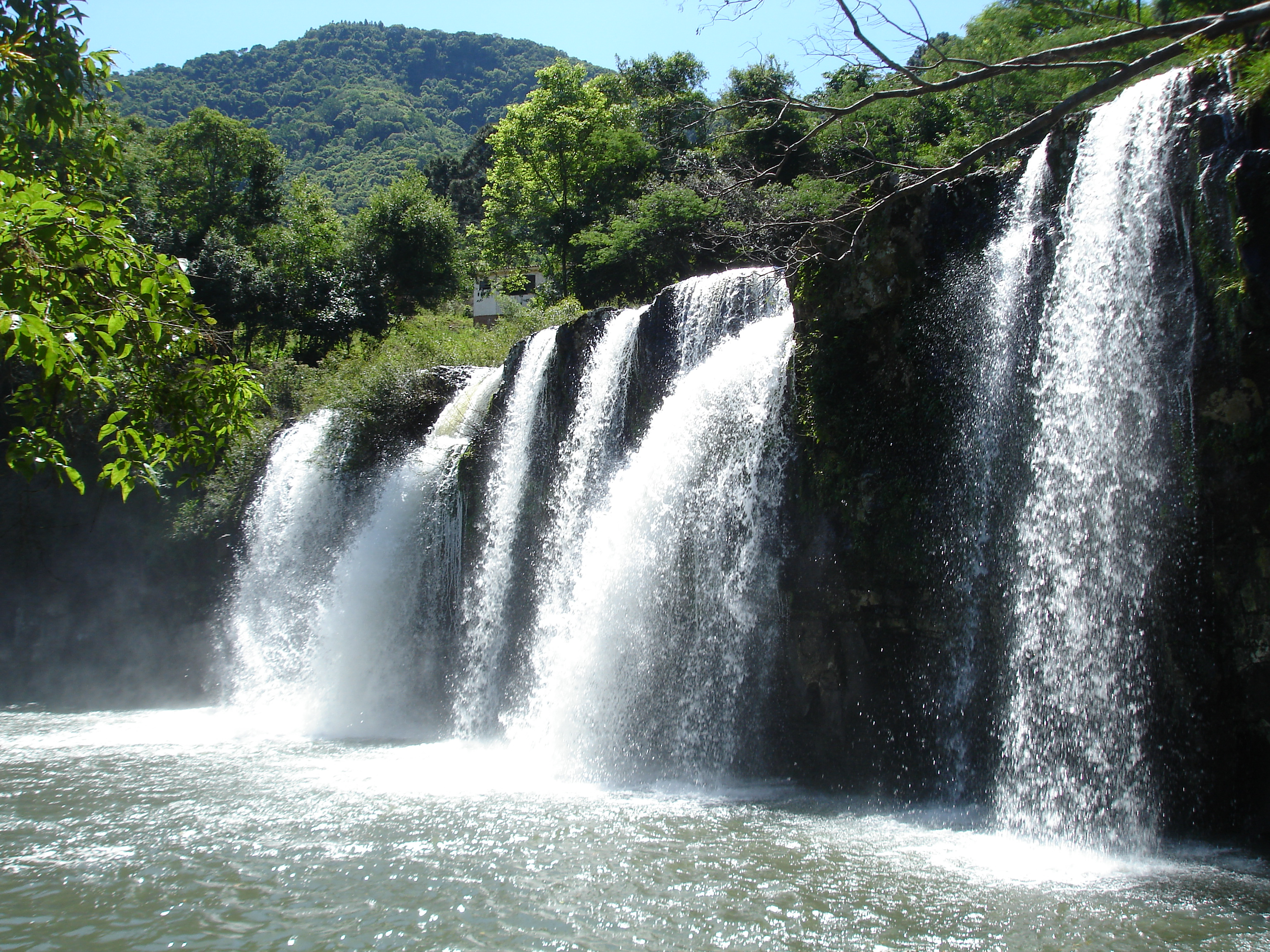
The biggest water fall of the reserve: the "Salto do Rio Pardinho", is situated on the limits of the area.

== Location ==
The Private Reserve of Natural Heritage (RPPN) of University of Santa Cruz do Sul is located in municipality of Sinimbu in Rio Grande do Sul state, Brazil, distant about 48 km north of municipality of Santa Cruz do Sul. Unfortunately it is the only RPPN present in the highlands scarp region in this state, although the creation of Preservation Areas in this region in order to protect the last primary forest fragments of this region had been suggested in 2003.

== Characteristics ==
Created in 2009 and having an area of 221.39 hectares, the Reserve is within an ecotone between the seasonal deciduous forest and the Araucaria moist forest. Altitude vary from 150 m eastwards, at the Pardinho river's riverbed and 650 m at hilltops. The reserve is within the Atlantic Forest Biome, having a seasonal deciduous forest predominantly secondary once the former residents used a good part of the local's natural resources by removing vegetation and livestock practice. Less impacted areas were left on hillsides due to its topographic conditions.

== Research ==
Despite being created only in 2009, research activities began in 2006 resulting quali-quantitative publications about the local and regional fauna and flora:

- Mammalian fauna of medium and large size.

- Avifauna

- Trees

== Flora ==
Until 2010, 149 native species and 11 exotic species of trees were found in the area and surroundings, where, among the exotic species, five are considered invasive species and need urgent control measures. The arboreal vegetation is characterized by presenting species from the seasonal deciduous forest and from the Araucaria moist forest. The reserve is home for 12 endangered species according to the lists of Threatened Species of Rio Grande do Sul state, Brazilian Endangered Species and IUCN Red List: Araucaria angustifolia (Bertol.) Kuntze, Gochnatia polymorpha (Less.) Cabrera, Maytenus aquifolium Mart., Dicksonia sellowiana Hook, Albizia edwallii (Hoehne) Barneby & J.Grimes, Myrocarpus frondosus Allemão, Cedrela fissilis Vell., Myrcianthes pungens (O.Berg) D.Legrand, Podocarpus lambertii Klotzsch ex Endl., Rudgea parquioides(Cham.) Müll.Arg., Picramnia parvifolia Engl. and Picrasma crenata (Vell.) Engl. In a survey located in a one-hectare plot in a slope in the area, 1,063 individuals belonging to 69 species were found.

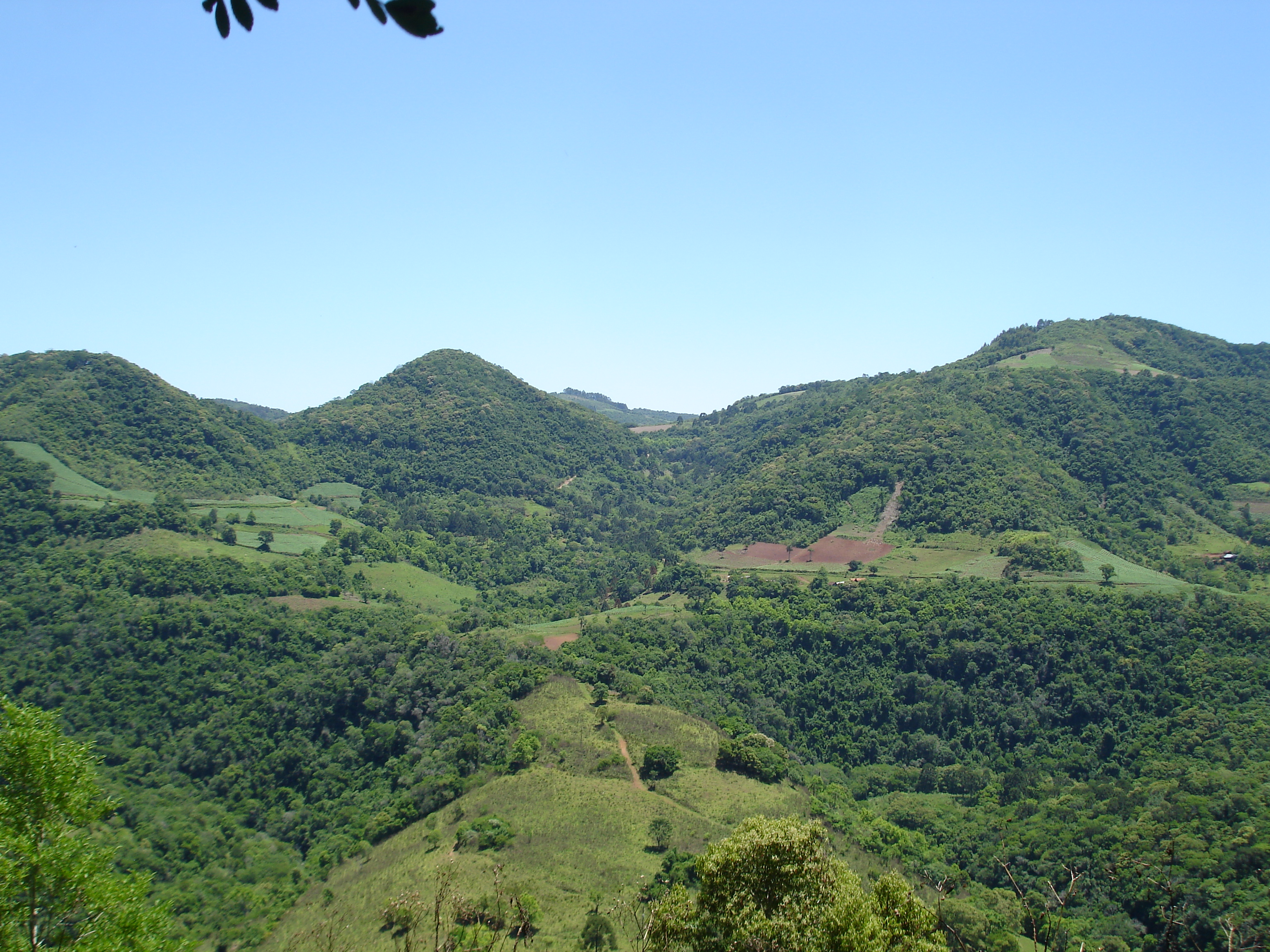
Lateral view of the preservation area.

== Fauna ==
=== Mammals ===
Until the year 2009, 16 species of wild mammals were registered in the area, which eight are endangered: Alouatta guariba clamitans, Cebus nigritus, Eira barbara, Nasua nasua, Leopardus wiedii Chironectes minimus, Lontra longicaudis and Cuniculus paca. Domestic animals were also found in the area and control suggestions were proposed in order to ensure the survival and a sobrevivência and viability of local wildlife populations .

=== Avifauna ===
Were found 169 birds species, being most part forest species and 44 are endemic of Atlantic Forest. Five species are in extinction risk for the state of Rio Grande do Sul, Brazil: Odontophorus capueira, Patagioenas cayennensis, Triclaria malachitacea, Grallaria varia and Amazona pretrei (the latter is globally threatened), among other rare or "near threatened" species, as well as species typically found in seasonal forests and in higher parts of the highlands showing that the area is an ecotone between the seasonal deciduous forest and the Araucaria moist forest.

== Ecotourism and Environmental education ==
Activities of ecotourism and environmental education are also realized in the area, where three different tracks are available between the forest, having different difficulty levels. In the years 2007, 2008 and 2009 the RPPN received special visits of students and docents from Biology and Geoecology courses from Germany universities of Tübingen and Rottenburg.

== See also ==
- Atlantic Forest
- IBAMA
- IUCN
- Endangered species
