= Central Depression (Rio Grande do Sul) =

A physiographic region located in Rio Grande do Sul, the Central Depression, as the name suggests, is in the central part of the state, between the Planalto Médio and the Serra do Sudeste. It comprises the major municipalities of Porto Alegre, Gravataí, Santa Maria, Guaíba, Taquari, Canoas, Cachoeira do Sul, Santa Cruz do Sul, and covers an area of 31,778 km².

== Background ==
The relief in the region is gently undulating; the altitude is less than 100 m, with some plateau areas reaching between 250 and 300 m. The soil consists of alluvium along the rivers and sandstone to the south and north of the Jacuí River, with relatively poor nutrient-exchangeable materials. In the transition area between the Serra Geral and the Serra do Sudeste, sandstones, shales, and siltstones are found. The vegetation is divided into grassland, silvatic, and palustrine; grass formations predominate in the south, while forest species are found north of the Jacuí.

It is one of the two warmest regions in the state, along with the Campanha, with a precipitation rate of around 1600 mm. The prevailing winds come from the east, with occasional short and infrequent north winds.

== See also ==
- Fisiografia do Rio Grande do Sul
