= RPPN =

RPPN may refer to:

- Reserva Particular do Patrimônio Natural, a type of protected area in Brazil
  - RPPN da Unisc, Santa Cruz do Sul University Private Natural Heritage Reserve
- Rastriya Prajatantra Party Nepal
- Rancudo Airfield (IATA code: RPPN), an airport in Kalayaan, Palawan, Philippines
