= Santa Cruz do Sul =

Municipality of Rio Grande do Sul, Brazil

- Municipality
- Municipality of Santa Cruz do Sul
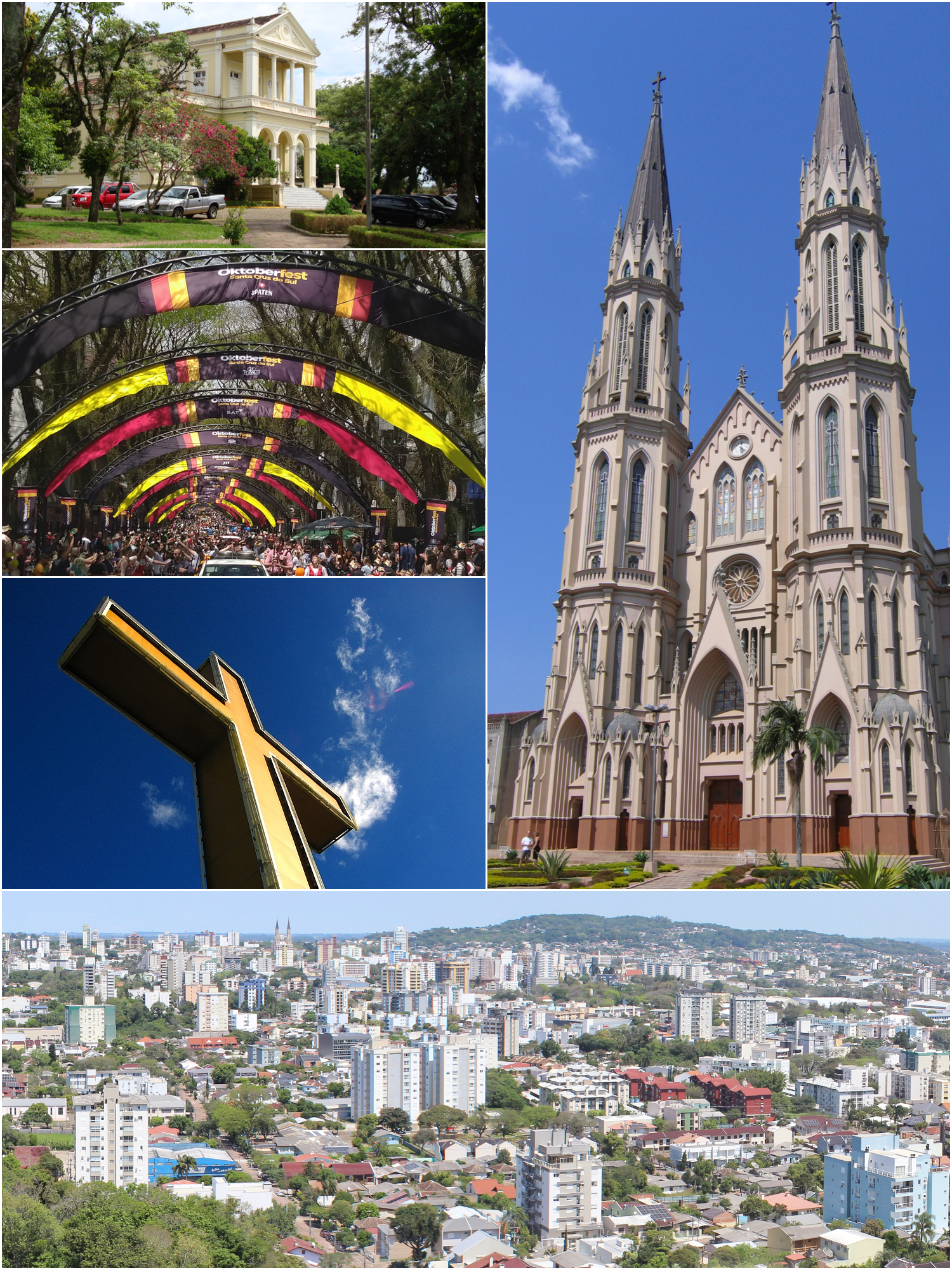
- On the right, São João Batista Cathedral. On the left, the city hall, citizens parading in German attire during Oktoberfest, and the hilltop cross. Below, a panoramic view of the city center.

- Flag Coat of arms

- Location in Rio Grande do Sul
- Coordinates: 29°43′04″S 52°25′33″W
- Country: Brazil
- Region: South
- State: Rio Grande do Sul
- Founded: March 31, 1877

Government
  - Mayor: Sérgio Moraes (PL)

Area
  - Total: 733.898 km^{2} (283.360 sq mi)
- Elevation: 122 m (400 ft)

Population (2025)
  - Total: 138,270
  - Rank: RS: 14th BR: 233rd
  - Density: 188.40/km^{2} (487.97/sq mi)
- Demonym: Santa-cruzense
- Time zone: UTC-3 (BRT)
- HDI: 0.773 (2010)
- HDI rank: RS: 26th BR: 197th
- GDP: R$ 10,494,583,160 (2020)
- GDP rank: RS: 5th BR: 115th
- GDP per capita: R$ 79,888.73 (2020)
- Climate: Temperate (Cfa)
- Website: www.santacruz.rs.gov.br

Santa Cruz do Sul is a Brazilian municipality located in the central region of the state of Rio Grande do Sul, approximately 155 kilometres (96 mi) from Porto Alegre. According to estimates by the Brazilian Institute of Geography and Statistics (IBGE), its population in 2024 was 138,104, making it the 14th most populous municipality in Rio Grande do Sul. Covering an area of 733.4 square kilometres (283.2 mi^{2}), it is situated in the Vale do Rio Pardo region, bordering the municipalities of Vera Cruz, Rio Pardo, Sinimbu, Venâncio Aires, and Passo do Sobrado. The municipality has a temperate climate, lies in a physiographic transition zone between the Brazilian Highlands and the Central Depression, and features vegetation from both the Atlantic Forest and the Pampas, with a predominance of volcanic rocks.

Originally established as the Santa Cruz Colony on December 6, 1847, the city was officially founded on March 31, 1877, when it was emancipated from Rio Pardo. A significant hub of German colonization in Rio Grande do Sul, the municipality is bilingual, with residents speaking both Portuguese and German, particularly the Hunsrückisch dialect. Its economy has historically been tied to tobacco, earning it the title of the world’s tobacco capital. The city experienced substantial economic growth, verticalization, and rural exodus from the 20th century into the early 21st century. In 2018, its gross domestic product (GDP) reached 9.4 billion reais, ranking as the sixth largest in the state, while its Human Development Index (HDI) in 2010 was 0.733, classified as high.

Predominantly Catholic and Evangelical, Santa Cruz do Sul is home to the St. John the Baptist Cathedral, the largest Gothic-style cathedral in South America, and the Evangelical Lutheran Church, the largest Evangelical temple in Rio Grande do Sul. The city is home to the University of Santa Cruz do Sul, with 11,000 students enrolled in 52 undergraduate programs, alongside three other higher education institutions, 14 high schools, 114 elementary schools, and three hospitals. It also has an airport and a regional prison.

With robust tourism infrastructure, Santa Cruz do Sul is renowned for hosting the largest Oktoberfest in Rio Grande do Sul, the Oktoberfest of Santa Cruz do Sul, and one of the largest amateur art festivals in Latin America, the Encontro de Arte e Tradição. The city is also home to the Santa Cruz do Sul International Raceway, as well as two professional football clubs, Esporte Clube Avenida and Futebol Clube Santa Cruz, and a professional basketball club, União Corinthians.

== History ==
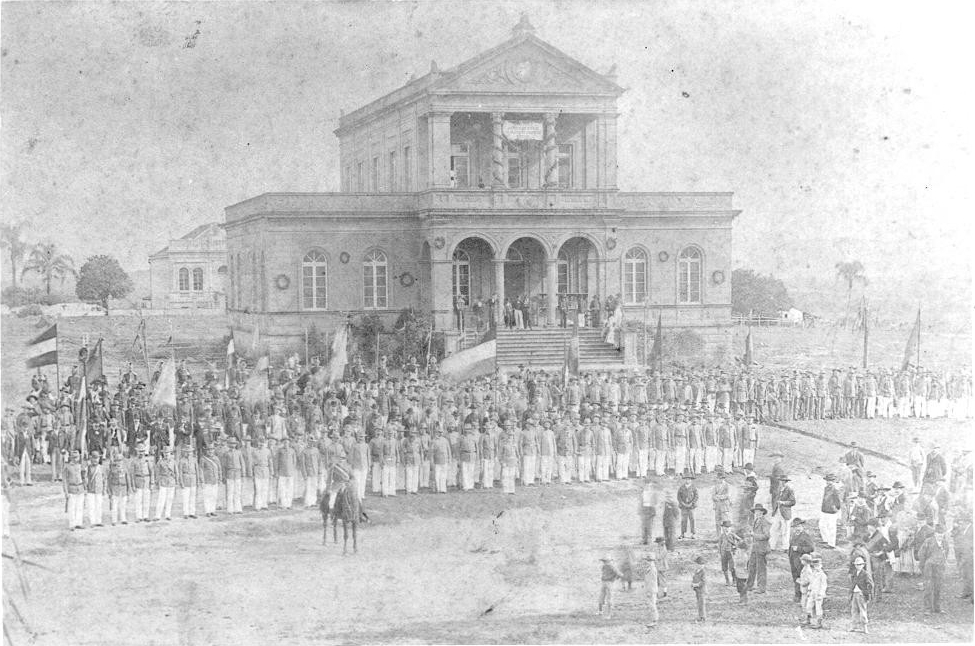
Inauguration ceremony of the City Hall in 1892

=== Founding and early years ===
The Santa Cruz Colony was established by provincial law on December 6, 1847, driven by the Rio Pardo Chamber’s desire to facilitate communication with the surrounding fields and promote regional commerce. The first settlers arrived in 1849 and lived in rudimentary huts and shelters. The colony was elevated to freguesia status on January 8, 1859. In 1879, according to a survey by Carlos Trein Filho, 90.54% of the colony’s inhabitants, excluding Brazilians, originated from the Kingdom of Prussia, with 42.53% from Pomerania, 37.88% from the Rhineland, 4.46% from Prussia, 3.57% from Silesia, 1.65% from Westphalia, and 0.14% from Brandenburg. An additional 8.92% came from other German states, and 0.55% from other European regions. The lands occupied by the colony were granted by the imperial government through the 1848 immigration incentive law. The colonization aimed to revitalize the economy without merely replacing the former slave labor. The immigrants settled in Colônia Picada Velha (Alt Picade), now known as Linha Santa Cruz.

In 1849, the area, then called Faxinal de João Faria, on lands owned by Antônio Martins da Cruz Jobim, Baron of Cambaí, was settled by five German families. The colony’s first administrator was Evaristo Alves de Oliveira, and its first director was Johann Martin Buff, a German immigrant and engineer hailing from Rödelheim, near Frankfurt. Although most immigrants were farmers, many artisans also settled in the colony, such as a group of 71 family heads who arrived in 1853, comprising 25 artisans and 46 farmers. Despite challenges in land settlement—initially dense native forest—and financial and political difficulties reported by Oliveira and Buff, the colony grew rapidly: in 1849, it had 12 inhabitants; by 1852, 254; in 1853, an additional 692; and by 1859, a total of 2,723 residents.

Initially, the settlers practiced polyculture for subsistence, cultivating seeds brought from Germany, such as potatoes, oats, and rye, alongside local crops such as maize, rice, and beans. However, the region soon became a hub for tobacco production. Between 1859 and 1881, tobacco output surged from 14 to 1,552 tons, becoming the main export, with 95% of the harvest shipped to other regions. The city was officially founded on March 31, 1877, gaining autonomy from Rio Pardo under law nº 1079. On September 28, 1878, the Municipal Chamber was established in a building at the corner of São Pedro and Taquarembó streets (now Marechal Floriano and 28 de Setembro). The inaugural session was presided over by councilor Joaquim José de Brito (Lieutenant Colonel Brito), but by the first regular session on October 15, Carlos Trein Filho assumed the presidency. One of the councilors at the first session, Pedro Werlang, distinguished himself in the Paraguayan War, earning medals and honors, including the Imperial Order of the Rose, which conferred upon him the rank of captain in the Brazilian imperial army.

=== Expansion and modern times ===
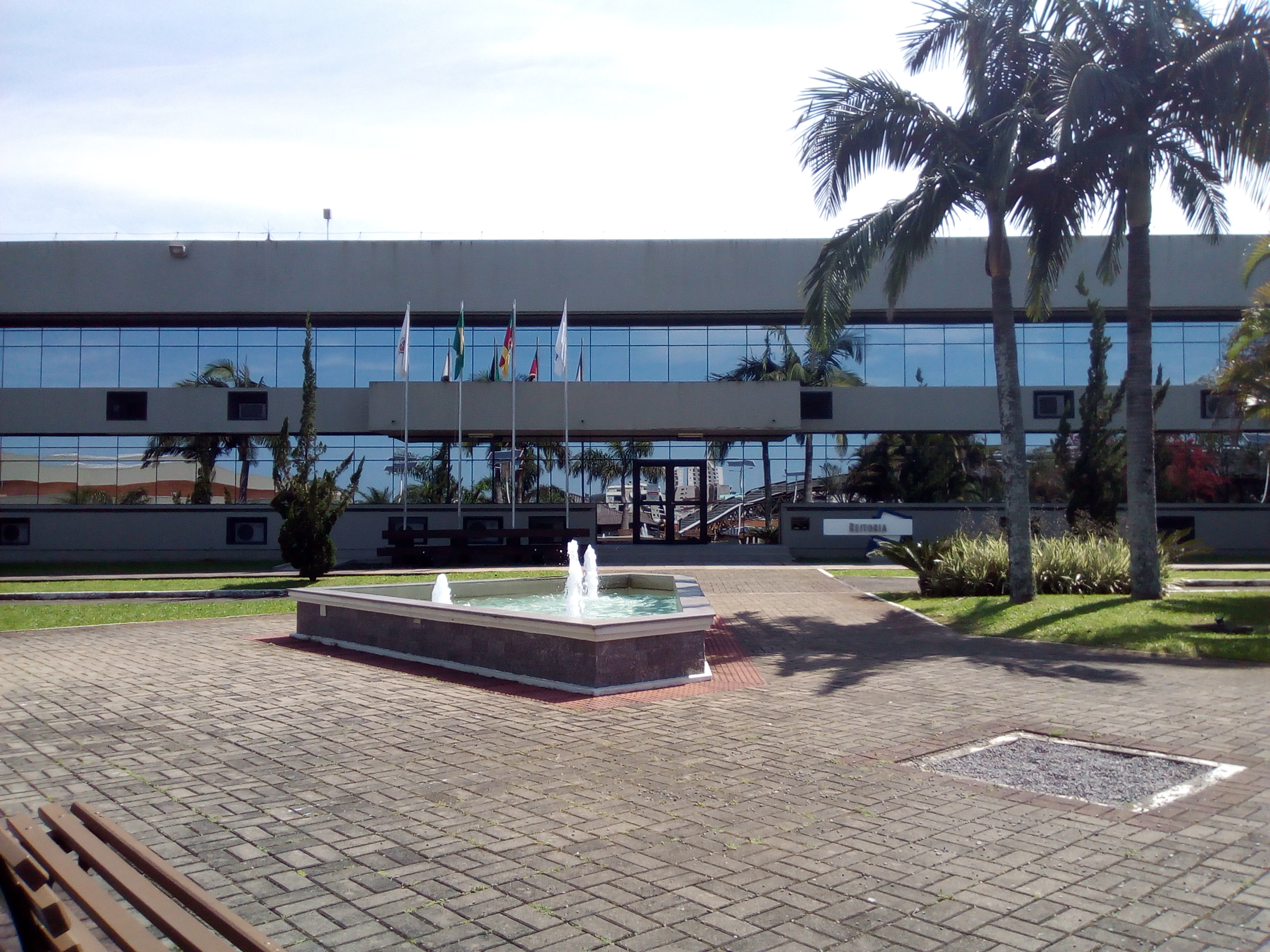
Rectorate of UNISC, on the Santa Cruz campus

With emancipation, agricultural surpluses, and the presence of artisans and other professionals, the city developed a solid foundation for economic diversification and the emergence of a local middle bourgeoisie. Some small farmers achieved economic mobility, establishing small commercial and industrial enterprises. In 1904, through mutual cooperation, the community founded the first local financial institution, the Caixa de Crédito Santa-Cruzense. This bank later expanded, becoming the Banco Agrícola Mercantil, which subsequently merged with the Banco Moreira Salles to form Unibanco. In the following decades, urban improvements included the expansion of paved streets, access to electricity in 1906, telephony in 1907, and piped water in 1908.

In 1905, the Santa Cruz–Rio Pardo railway (Couto station) was inaugurated, boosting integration with Porto Alegre and facilitating the movement of goods and people. The railway station was established that same year by the provincial president, Borges de Medeiros. However, due to the decline of Brazil’s railway system, the line was discontinued in 1965.

From 1917, with the establishment of The Brazilian Tobacco Corporation, financed by British American Tobacco, until 1965, the city experienced significant growth in the tobacco sector, earning the title of the "world’s tobacco capital." From 1918, medium and large companies dominated tobacco processing, beginning with the Companhia de Fumo Santa Cruz, a merger of six smaller firms. In 1919, the Anglo-Brazilian Souza Cruz arrived, followed by the German-Brazilian Tabacos Tatch in 1932, the Brazilian Companhia de Tabacos Sinimbu in 1948, and the French Meridional Tabacos in 1975. These companies expanded their influence, investing in seed enhancement technology, supporting rural producers, and setting production quotas and prices. By 1970, Santa Cruz boasted a robust industrial economy, with tobacco as its flagship.

In 1937, during the Vargas Era and amid World War II, the federal government launched a nationalist campaign banning the use and teaching of German, closing German-language newspapers and cultural institutions, significantly impacting the region where German remains spoken and taught. This led to the closure of the newspaper Kolonie in 1941, which had operated since 1891. After the war, it resumed publication in Portuguese as Gazeta de Santa Cruz, now known as Gazeta do Sul. Post-war sentiments subdued the city’s Germanic culture, which resurged in the 1970s.

In 1962, the Associação Pró-Ensino em Santa Cruz do Sul (APESC) began offering higher education courses. In 1980, it consolidated four colleges into the Faculdades Integradas de Santa Cruz do Sul (FISC). Construction of the current University of Santa Cruz do Sul (UNISC) campus began in 1982, with the project and accreditations completed in 1993. Today, UNISC operates campuses across several municipalities in Rio Grande do Sul, contributing to the municipality’s demographic growth.

From 1970 to 2010, the city underwent significant verticalization, starting in the central area. The relocation of FISC to the Universitário neighborhood and the development of the city’s industrial district spurred verticalization in other neighborhoods. Between 1970 and 1986, 899 vertical units—apartments, shops, and offices—were built. From 1987 to 1994, this number increased by 135.84%, and from 1995 to 2010, by 64%, totaling 3,654 units. During this period, a rural exodus reduced the rural population from 62% in 1970 to 11% in 2010, alongside demographic growth driven partly by labor demand in the tobacco sector. The city also saw irregular occupation of peripheral areas.

In 2020, a law was passed recognizing the German language as part of the municipality’s cultural heritage.

Today, the city is expanding notably in its northern and northeastern regions, with the emergence of gated communities, particularly upscale ones, alongside moderate growth in overall construction.

== Geography ==
Santa Cruz do Sul is located 155 kilometres (96 mi) from Porto Alegre and 142 kilometres (88 mi) from Santa Maria, in the central part of the state, within the Vale do Rio Pardo region. It borders Vera Cruz to the east, Rio Pardo to the south, Sinimbu to the northwest, Venâncio Aires to the northeast, and Passo do Sobrado to the east, serving as the region’s hub. According to the regional division in effect since 2017, established by the IBGE, the municipality belongs to the Intermediate Geographic Region of Santa Cruz do Sul-Lajeado and the Immediate Geographic Region of Santa Cruz do Sul. Previously, under the division into microregions and mesoregions, it was part of the Santa Cruz do Sul microregion, within the Centro Oriental Rio-Grandense mesoregion.

The municipality lies in a physiographic transition zone between the Brazilian Highlands and the Central Depression, along the banks of the Pardinho River. It encompasses the Atlantic Forest and Pampas biomes, with a landscape of valleys, hills, and undulations. The predominant lithology consists of volcanic rocks.

The region includes three sub-watersheds—the Pardo, Taquari-Antas, and Lower Jacuí, with the Pardo being the most significant, fed primarily by the Pardinho River. In the Taquari-Antas watershed, the main water source is the Taquari Mirim River. The city also has several micro-watersheds for sewage drainage. Due to its geographic characteristics, parts of the municipality are prone to flooding, with emergency and public calamity declarations recorded in 1984, 1993, 2005, 2009, 2010, and 2011.

A bordering area of native forest and environmental preservation, known as the Cinturão Verde (Green Belt), has restricted occupation. Established under law nº 571 on December 2, 1957, and demarcated by decree nº 4117 on May 26, 1994, it spans 465 hectares. The area supports pollinator species, captures water, absorbs dust, and holds aesthetic value for the city. A partial survey identified 39 different species in the region. A 2014 decree tightened environmental licensing for activities in the area, though real estate development has reduced its size despite existing regulations.

In the city center, particularly along Marechal Floriano Peixoto Street, the "túnel verde" (green tunnel) features a canopy of tipuana trees. These trees, some over 70 years old, are of different ages. Several of them have problems, and since 2019, some have been cut down or replaced.

=== Climate ===
Santa Cruz do Sul has a temperate climate (classified as Cfa under the Köppen climate classification), with an average annual temperature of 19.7 °C (67.5 °F). Absolute lows reach 1 °C (34 °F), and highs hit 41 °C (106 °F). Annual precipitation averages 1,311 millimeters (mm), evenly distributed throughout the year, though higher from October to April, with January being the wettest month (159). The city’s location results in orographic precipitation. Winds average 1.5 to 2 metres per second (4.5 mph). The region is influenced by the Polar Atlantic, Tropical Atlantic, and Tropical Continental air masses. Snow is rare, with recorded events on August 18–19, 1965, and September 4, 2006.

Climate data for Santa Cruz do Sul
Month	Jan	Feb	Mar	Apr	May	Jun	Jul	Aug	Sep	Oct	Nov	Dec	Year
Mean daily maximum °C (°F)	30.1 (86.2)	28.7 (83.7)	26 (79)	22.9 (73.2)	20 (68)	19.6 (67.3)	20.1 (68.2)	21.6 (70.9)	23.8 (74.8)	26.3 (79.3)	28.8 (83.8)	26.4 (79.5)	22.6 (72.7)
Daily mean °C (°F)	25 (77)	23.9 (75.0)	21.3 (70.3)	18.4 (65.1)	15.6 (60.1)	15.1 (59.2)	15.5 (59.9)	16.8 (62.2)	18.6 (65.5)	20.9 (69.6)	23.3 (73.9)	21.4 (70.5)	19.7 (67.5)
Mean daily minimum °C (°F)	19.9 (67.8)	19.1 (66.4)	16.6 (61.9)	13.9 (57.0)	11.2 (52.2)	10.6 (51.1)	10.9 (51.6)	12.1 (53.8)	13.5 (56.3)	15.6 (60.1)	17.8 (64.0)	16.4 (61.5)	14.8 (58.6)
Average precipitation mm (inches)	159 (6.3)	140 (5.5)	151 (5.9)	103 (4.1)	82 (3.2)	76 (3.0)	68 (2.7)	73 (2.9)	97 (3.8)	104 (4.1)	120 (4.7)	138 (5.4)	1,311 (51.6)
Source: Climate Data (2017).

== Demography ==
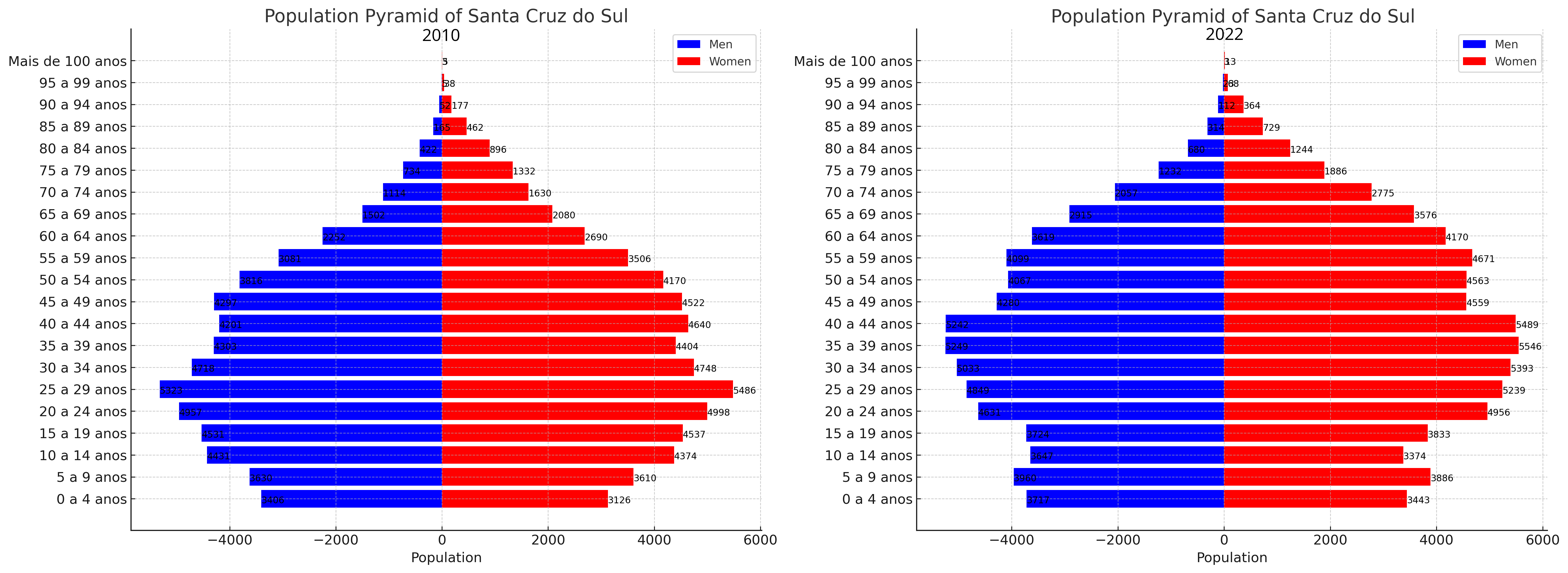
Population pyramid of Santa Cruz do Sul in 2010 and 2022.

Historical population
Year	Pop.	±%
1890	15,536	—
1900	23,158	+49.1%
1920	41,136	+77.6%
1940	55,041	+33.8%
1950	69,605	+26.5%
1960	75,931	+9.1%
1970	86,787	+14.3%
1980	99,645	+14.8%
1991	117,773	+18.2%
2000	107,642	−8.6%
2010	106,669	−0.9%
2022	133,230	+24.9%
Sources: 1890 to 2000, 2010, (Note: The population was 96,410 in 2010.) 2022.

According to the 2022 Brazilian Census, Santa Cruz do Sul had a population of 133,230, making it the 14th most populous municipality in Rio Grande do Sul. An IBGE estimate for 2025 reported a population of 138,270, a 3.78% increase. In 2010, with 118,374 inhabitants, 88% resided in urban areas, and the population density was 161 inhabitants per square kilometer.

In 2010, 86.12% of the population was White, 13.75% were Black or Brown, and the remaining 0.37% were Asian or Indigenous. Unlike its early years, by 2010, 99.76% of the permanent resident population were native-born Brazilians, with only 249 foreigners and 30 naturalized Brazilians.

The municipality’s HDI in 2010 was 0.733, considered high, while its IDESE (Socioeconomic Development Index) in 2020 was 0.814, also high. Life expectancy at birth was 76.1 years—up from 69 in 1991—and the infant mortality rate was 11.8 per thousand, down from 21.5 in 1991.

Approximately 58% of the adult population had not completed high school, with 4% having incomplete primary education and being illiterate, 38.2% having incomplete primary education but literate, and 16% with incomplete high school education. Meanwhile, 27.6% had completed high school or had some college education, and 14.2% had completed higher education.

The proportion of the population living in poverty decreased from 16.14% in 1991 to 10.65% in 2000 and 3.68% in 2010. The Gini coefficient fell from 0.54 in 1991 to 0.53 in 2000 and 0.49 in 2010. Extreme poverty dropped from 3.76% in 1991 to 2.59% in 2000 and 0.96% in 2010. Vulnerability to poverty declined from 41.31% in 1991 to 25.68% in 2000 and 11.76% in 2010.

=== Religion ===
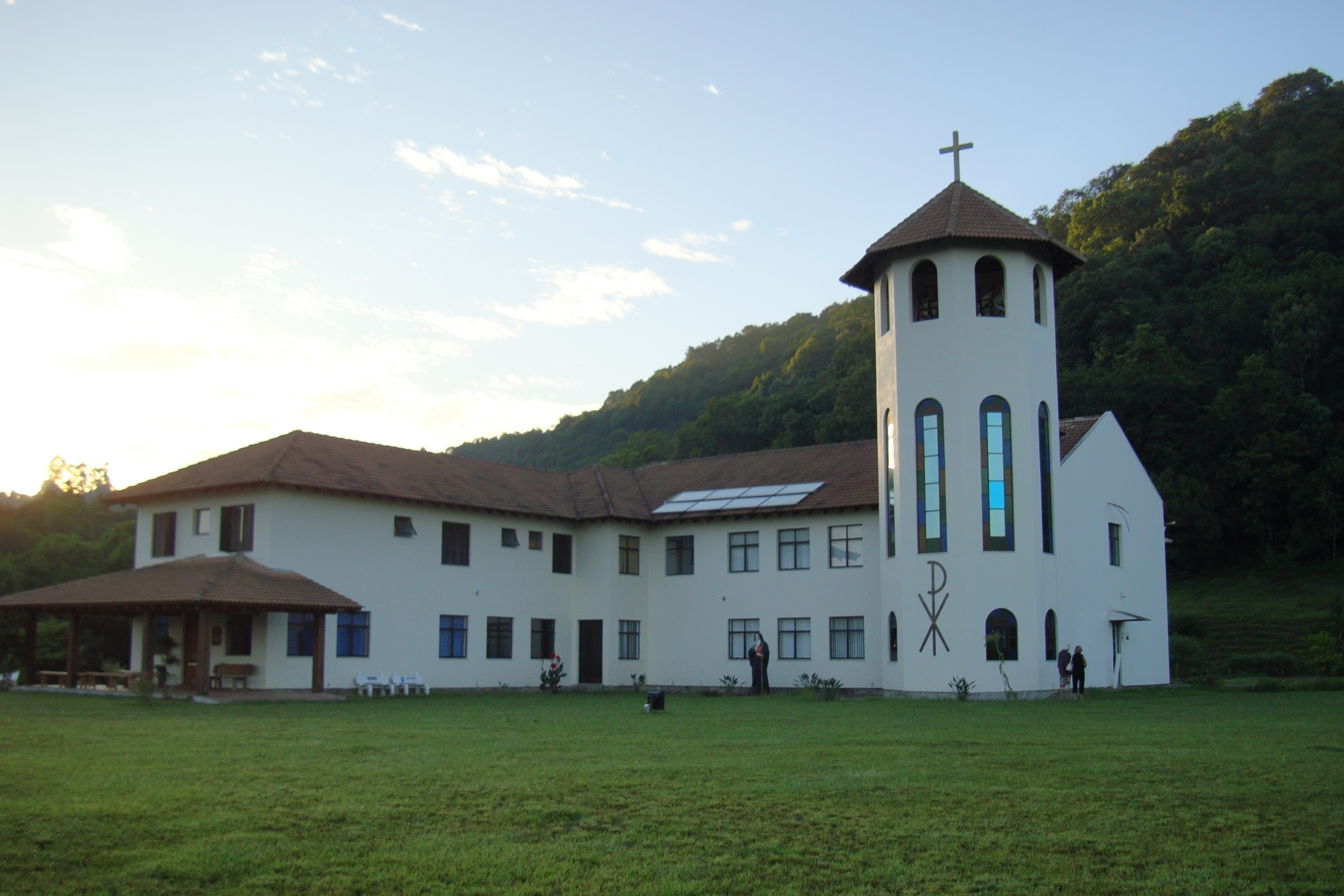
The Monastery of the Holy Trinity

In 2010, 75.14% of the population was Catholic, 20% were Evangelical—60% of whom belonged to missionary denominations, with 95% being Lutheran—2% were Spiritists, 1.5% had no religion, and the remaining 1.36% followed other faiths.

The first chapel in the city was established in 1855 by the local government. Today, in addition to the São João Batista Cathedral, a city landmark and the largest Gothic-style cathedral in South America, the city is home to numerous other churches and temples, including the Evangelical Church of the Lutheran Confession. Founded in 1924, it is the largest evangelical temple in Rio Grande do Sul, with a capacity to accommodate up to 500 worshippers. The Loyola Retreat House, a venue for religious gatherings with accommodations for one hundred people, is considered a tourist attraction, featuring an area of 5.3 hectares (13 acres) near a grotto. In 1997, the Monastery of the Holy Trinity was founded, with its construction completed in 2000. Housing Christian nuns from the city, it also includes a library, a dining hall where fairs are held, gardens, a chapel, and other facilities. It was also the residence of the singer Belchior. The city also hosts the second chapel of the Schoenstatt Apostolic Movement in Rio Grande do Sul, the first being located in Santa Maria, as well as the Church of the Holy Martyrs of the Missions, established in 1945, from where the Santa Cruz pilgrimage departs, an event held annually since 2001.

== Politics and administration ==
The legislative branch is exercised by the city council, while the executive branch is managed by the mayor's office, supported by various secretariats. In 2019, the city had 16 secretariats and 18 municipal councils.

The city council was established on September 28, 1878, at the corner of what are now Marechal Floriano and 28 de Setembro streets. After several relocations, it has been housed since 2016 in a rented building on Fernando Abott Street. From 1878 to 1937, the council had 116 councilors. With the advent of the Estado Novo in 1937, municipal councils were closed by Getúlio Vargas. After Vargas's ousting in 1945, legislative terms, typically lasting four years, resumed. From the first term, which ended in 1947, to the 17th term, concluding in 2020, the council had 275 councilors, totaling 391 since its founding, with some re-elected. The first woman elected as a councilor was Glória Dulce Jacobus in 1964, the youngest councilor was André Luiz Beck in 1988 at age 22, and the councilor with the most votes was Rodrigo Rabuske in 2024, with 4,789 votes.

During the 2021–2024 term, the city council was composed of seventeen councilors. A proposal to increase the number to nineteen was made in 2015 but was unsuccessful. In the 2020 municipal elections, Helena Hermany (PP) was elected with 32.45% of the valid votes. In the 2016 municipal elections, her party colleague Telmo Kirst was re-elected, receiving 52.25% of the valid votes, while the runner-up, Sérgio Moraes (PTB), received 38.73%. Moraes had previously served as mayor twice, and his wife, Kelly Moraes, once. Kirst died on December 20, 2020, due to cancer. Hermany had resigned as deputy mayor, and the council elected Francisco Carlos Smidt (PSDB) as mayor, a position he held for only ten days until Hermany took office.

Regarding the Fiscal Responsibility Law (LRF), the municipal administration has consistently achieved results within the defined limits. According to the FIRJAN Fiscal Management Index (IFGF), the city's management is above the national average, having previously been classified as "in difficulty or critical". However, the investment situation is still considered "critical" by the IFGF, meaning the municipality has not invested as much as it could with its available resources. Specifically, the municipality's IFGF scores, ranging from zero (worst) to one (best), were 0.7381 overall, 1.0 in autonomy, 1.0 in personnel expenses, 0.3496 in investments, and 0.6027 in liquidity. In 2020, the index showed the best historical results across all indicators except investments. According to the Municipal Governance Index of the Federal Administration Council (IGM/CFA), which evaluates finances, management, and performance, the city received scores of 3.96, 6.19, and 5.54 in 2021, 2022, and 2023, respectively. The 2023 score places the municipality at 127th out of 162 federally among cities with over 100,000 inhabitants, and tenth in the state within this group. A positive component of the score was finances, while a negative one was public safety.

The municipal government's debt in 2019 was 76.9 million reais, including court-ordered debt payments. Of this, 43.9 million came from loans, 17.1 million from a debt related to public lighting, 9.3 million from liabilities with the National Social Security Institute (INSS), 5.4 million from outstanding payments, and 1.1 million from judicial convictions. The largest creditors were Caixa Econômica Federal, with 34.2 million, RGE, with 17.1 million, the federal government with 9.3 million, the Regional Development Bank of the Far South with 6.4 million, and Banco do Brasil with 3.1 million. Most of the debt was incurred during the municipal administrations of 2005–2008 under José Alberto Wenzel (PSDB) (8.5 million), 2009–2012 under Kelly Moraes (PTB) (23.1 million), and 2013–2020 under Telmo Kirst (PP) (12.1 million), with the public lighting debt dating back to the 1998–2006 administration of Sérgio Moraes (PDT).

== Subdivisions ==
The municipality is divided into nine districts, while the urban area was divided into 36 neighborhoods in 2010. The districts are Sede Municipal, Boa Vista, Monte Alverne, São Martinho, Saraiva, São José da Reserva, Rio Pardinho, Alto Paredão, and Área Anexada.

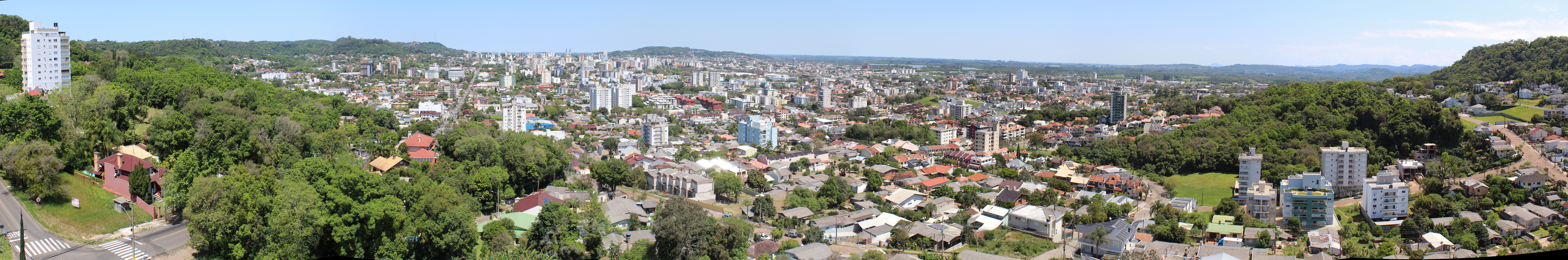
Panorama of the city in 2023, taken from the northern zone. In the background, from left to right, a small part of the Green Belt, the São João Batista Cathedral, the Evangelical Church of the Lutheran Confession, Telmo Kirst Lake, and Botucaraí Hill

== Economy ==
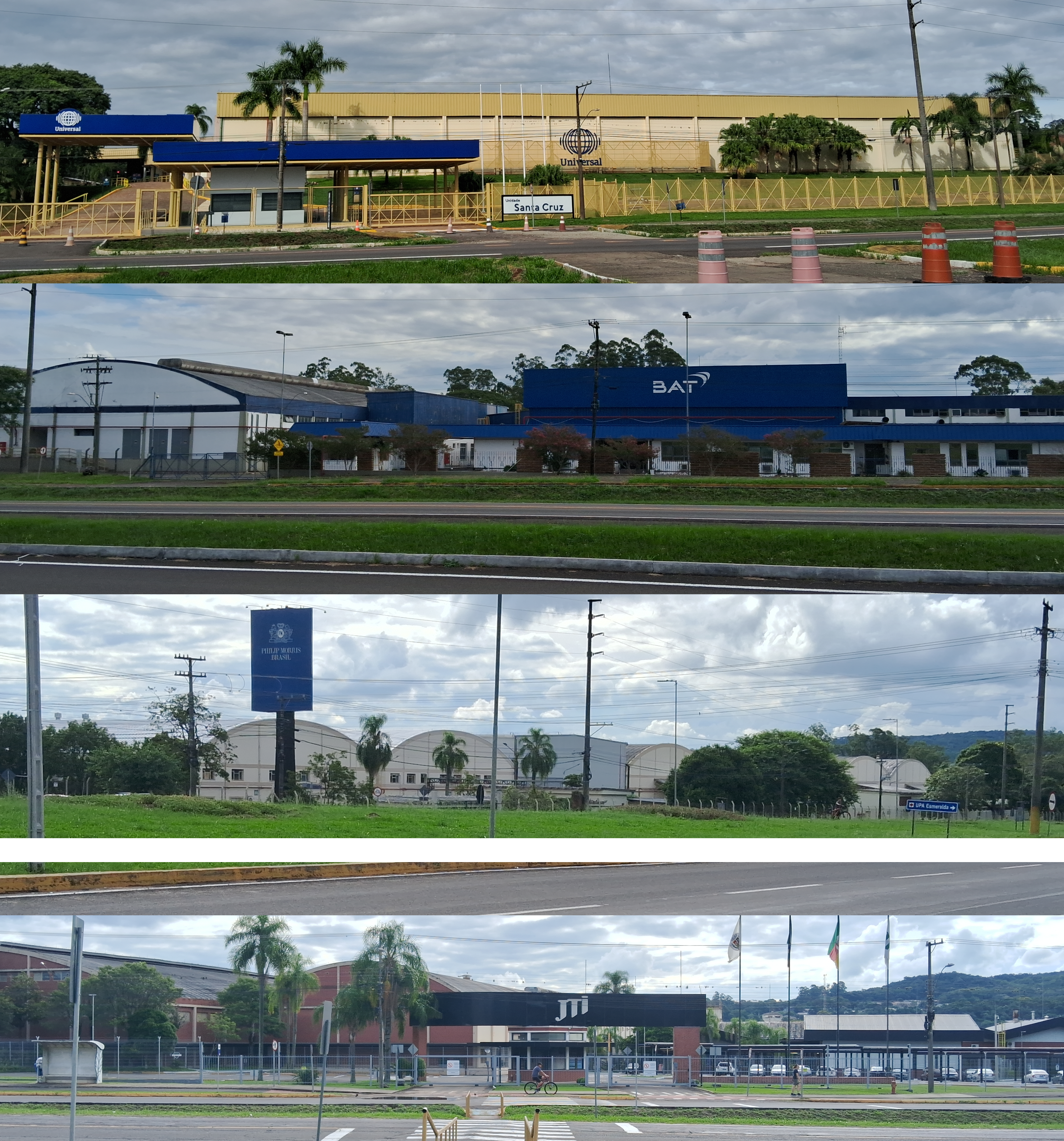
From top to bottom, factories of Universal, BAT, Philip Morris, and JTI, in the Industrial District of Santa Cruz do Sul. The latter three are among the five largest tobacco companies in the world, while Philip Morris accounted for more than half of the municipality's revenue.

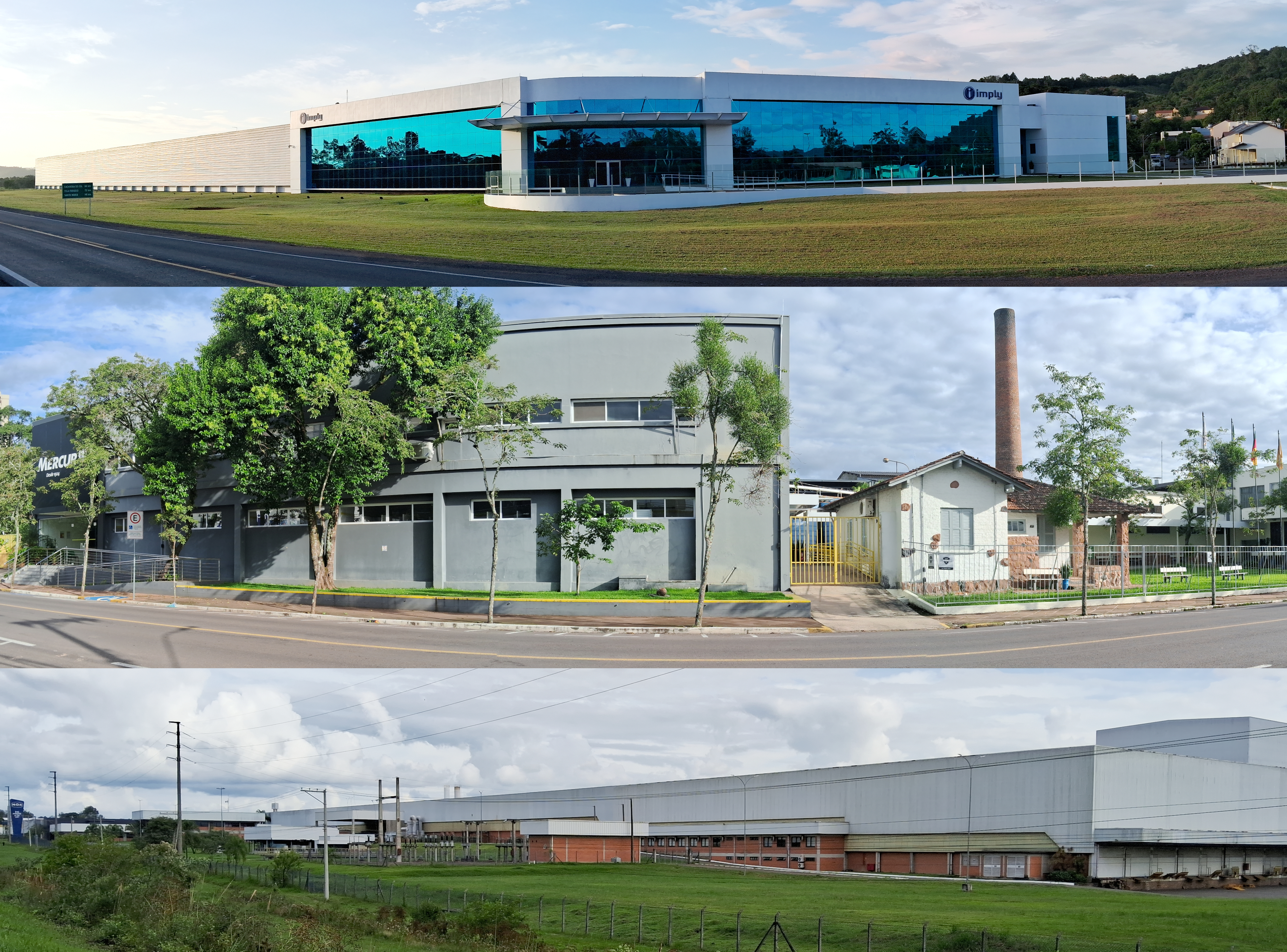
From top to bottom, factories of Imply, Mercur, and Mor, part of Santa Cruz's non-tobacco industry.

The main tobacco industries in Brazil are present in Santa Cruz do Sul. Among those established in the city are Souza Cruz, the market share leader in the country, and Philip Morris, which in 2015 accounted for 54% of the municipality's Tax on Circulation of Goods and Services (ICMS) revenue, among others. In 2013 and 2023, the municipality exported approximately 1.5 billion dollars in goods, with tobacco-related products being the top thirteen items.

The presence of these companies is supported by rural producers in Santa Cruz do Sul and neighboring cities such as Venâncio Aires, Vera Cruz, and Rio Pardo, for whom tobacco cultivation for processing is the primary source of income. Approximately 6,600 hectares of the municipality's area are dedicated to tobacco, yielding an annual production of 14,700 tons in the 2012/2013 harvest. Four thousand families in Santa Cruz are engaged in this activity.

The tobacco industry has a strong presence in the region's socioeconomic life, providing technical, financial, and social program support to tobacco farmers. This creates a system of exchanges and loyalties between most farmers and the industry, particularly through the Association of Brazilian Tobacco Farmers. In addition to tobacco, notable crops include maize, rice, cassava, soybean, bean, olive oil, horticulture, floriculture, sugarcane, sweet potato, potato, and grape. Livestock farming is also present. In total, there are 4,365 rural properties with an average area of 12.7 hectares (31 acres).

The city also has strong sectors in its economy, such as commerce and services. As a result, the commercial sector is currently represented by approximately 3,277 establishments and over 2,793 service-providing companies. In total, the municipality has 533 industries and 3,914 self-employed professionals. The largest companies in the municipality by added value in 2013 were Phillip Morris Brasil, Souza Cruz, Universal Leaf Tobacco, Japan Tobacco International, Metalúrgica Mor, Associated Tobacco do Brasil, Mercur, Excelsior Alimentos, Premium Tobacos do Brasil, and Xalingo. Additionally, Imply, a technology company, was listed in 2018 among the 5,000 largest exporters in Brazil out of 1 million companies. Finally, other local enterprises that stood out in the past include Cia. de Fumos Santa Cruz, Máquinas Binz, and Máquinas Schreiner.

The region's GDP in 2013 was 6.67 billion reais, the eighth largest in the state, contributing 2% to its economy. The municipality's per capita GDP was 53,500 reais, compared to 29,657 reais for the state and 26,445 reais for the country. By 2017, the GDP reached 8.23 billion reais, with a per capita of 64,600 reais, and in 2018, it was 10.5 billion reais, with a per capita of 79,900 reais, making it the fifth largest economy in the state. The average income of the municipality's residents increased from 554.13 reais in 1991 to 1,036.87 reais in 2010, and 2,130.66 reais in 2020, compared to the national average of 1,310 reais in the same year. Extreme poverty decreased from 3.76% to 0.96% between 1991 and 2010. The main occupations of workers are in manufacturing, commerce, agriculture and livestock, construction, public service, transportation, education, private services, and other liberal professions and service providers. Despite being an inland city, it ranked twentieth in a 2018 list of the best cities in Brazil for doing business.

=== Tourism ===
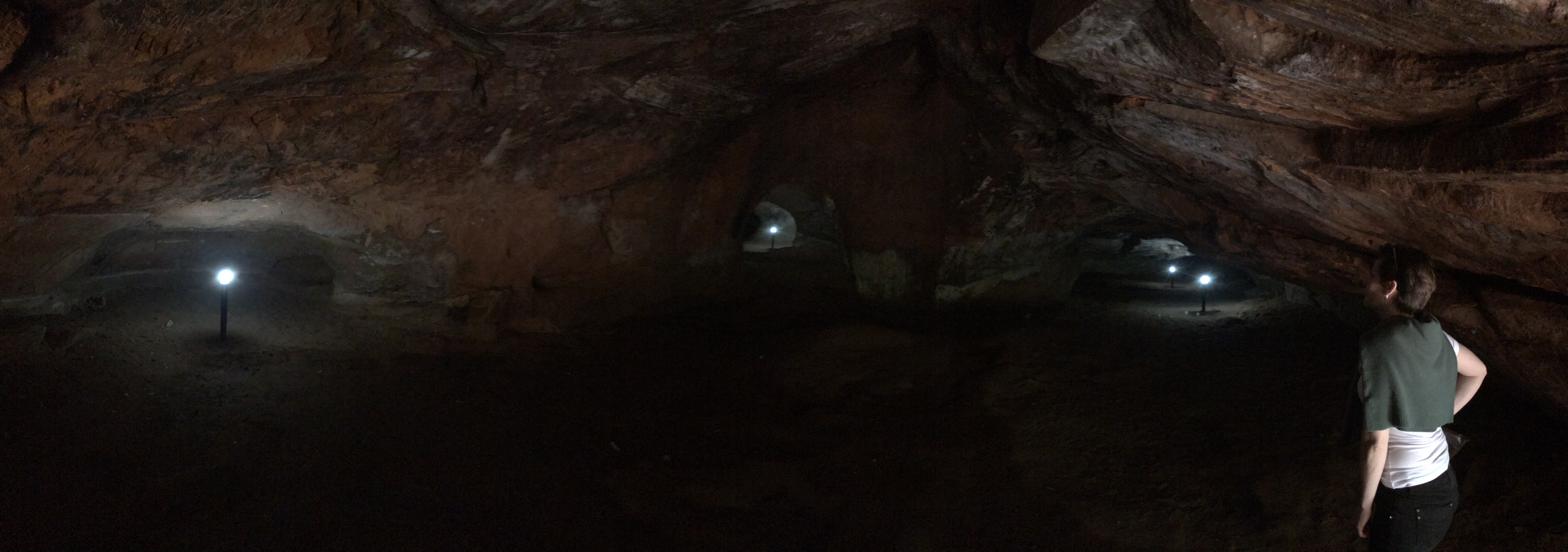
The grotto at Adventure Park, a paleoburrow of the megafauna excavated over ten thousand years ago.

The main event in Santa Cruz do Sul is the Oktoberfest of Santa Cruz do Sul, a popular German festival held annually in October. The Oktoberfest of Santa Cruz do Sul is the second largest in Brazil, surpassed only by the one in Blumenau, and the largest in Rio Grande do Sul. Promoted locally as the "festival of joy," its 2016 edition attracted approximately 150,000 paying visitors.

The city also hosts the Art and Tradition Encounter, an event celebrating Gaucho traditions, typically held in November, and is one of the largest of its kind in Latin America. The 2016 edition featured six thousand participating artists.

It is also home to the Santa Cruz do Sul International Racetrack, which was inaugurated on June 12, 2005, with a Renault Speed Show event. The venue has hosted stages of Stock Car Brasil, Fórmula Truck, among other competitions.

The city has robust infrastructure for events, earning it the Priority Seal for Tourism Development. It has sixteen hotels and five motels, offering a total of 1,900 beds. Over thirty restaurants, several colonial cafés, more than eight pizzerias, and numerous bars provide the community and tourists with a diverse culinary scene.

Other tourist attractions include the Grotto Park, also known as Adventure Park, a 17.4 hectares (43 acres) area with native forest, trails, a restaurant, and climbing equipment. The name derives from a paleoburrow located in the park, excavated by megafauna over ten thousand years ago, though mistakenly attributed to indigenous work (hence the colloquial name Indian Grotto). There is also the Cross Park, located on the site of a former quarry, an area restored by environmentalist José Lutzenberger, where a 20-meter-high cross was installed. Additionally, there is Telmo Kirst Lake, an artificial lake of 228.43 hectares built to supply water during droughts, featuring bike paths and rest areas along its shores, with plans to transform it into a tourism complex, previously named Lago Dourado. Away from the city center, there is an environmental park designed by Lutzenberger and maintained by Souza Cruz—covering 65 hectares (160 acres) and established in 2003, new species of fungi and insects have been cataloged there, making it one of the most biodiverse spaces in Rio Grande do Sul.

Outside the city but still within the municipality's limits, in the Rio Pardinho district, there is the Germanic Route, a path featuring homes and businesses of German descendants offering traditional cuisine, as well as the Monastery of the Holy Trinity, the Sanctuary of Our Lady, and the Church of the Immigrants, founded in 1890. In Linha Santa Cruz, there is the São Batista Seminary, established in 1968, where community events, mostly religious, are held, with open spaces for public visits. The rest of the structure houses the Santa Cruz Agricultural Family School and the seminary itself.

== Infrastructure ==
The city has 40,540 registered households, of which 91.37% have water supply, 90.87% have basic sanitation, 99.76% have electricity, and 98.28% have garbage collection. Water supply and sewage treatment are managed by Companhia Riograndense de Saneamento (CORSAN), while electricity is provided by RGE Sul (formerly AES Sul). The city has public housing projects in nine neighborhoods, receiving funds from the Growth Acceleration Program (PAC). Garbage collection is handled by CONESUL, while a cooperative manages selective collection and recycling. The city ranks seventh in the country for the number of photovoltaic plants installed by local companies, earning it the title of the "solar energy capital" of the state.

=== Healthcare ===
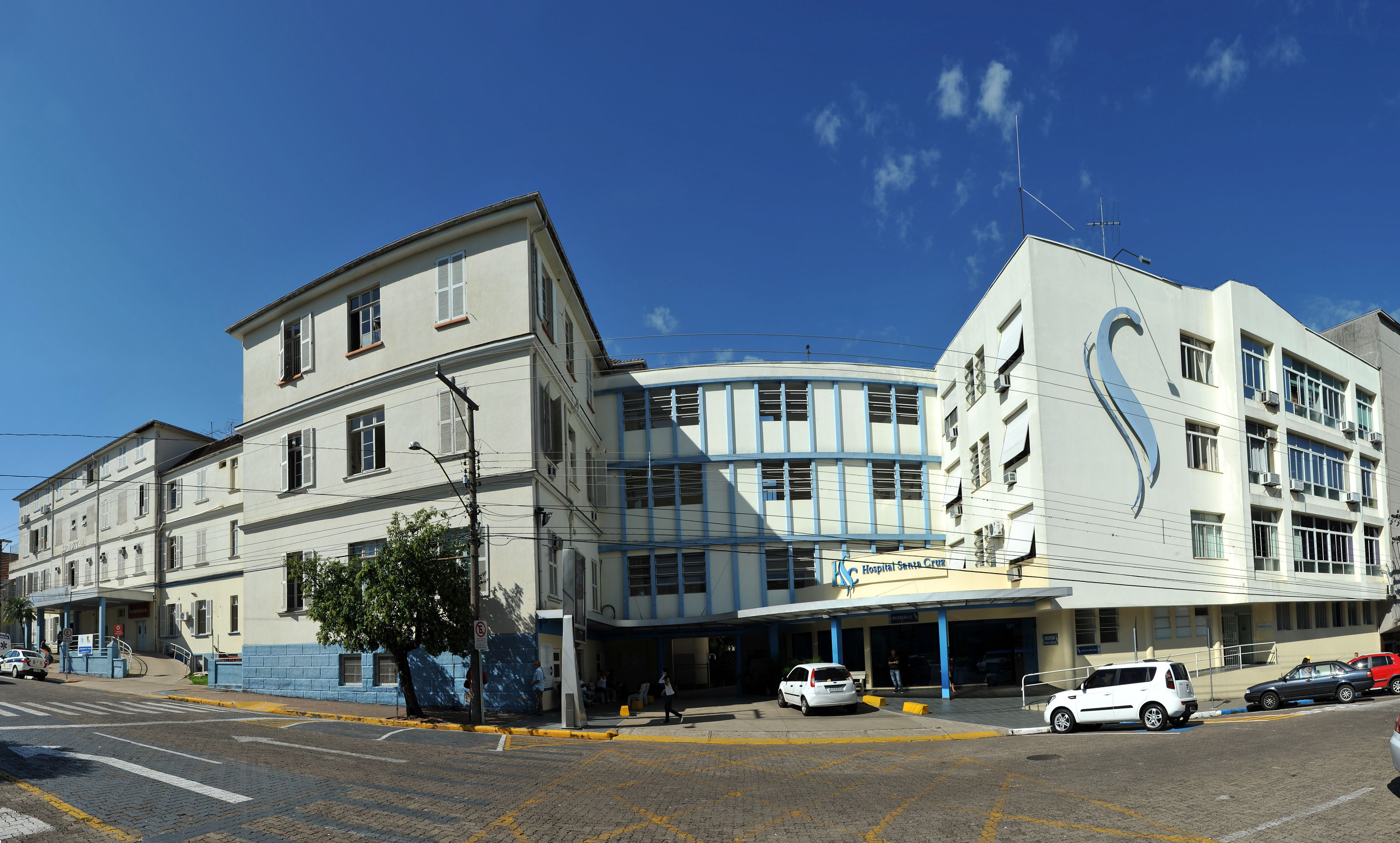
Facade of Santa Cruz Hospital

The city has three hospitals. The Ana Nery Hospital, founded in 1955 by the region's evangelical community, is private and philanthropic, serving as a reference for oncology in the region. In 2020, it had 71 beds, 15 of which were in the ICU, with a staff of 260 doctors, 48 nurses, and 179 nursing technicians. The Santa Cruz Hospital, founded in 1908, also philanthropic, is the main healthcare center in the Rio Pardo Valley. Managed by APESC, which also administers UNISC, in 2020, it had 232 beds, 35 of which were in the ICU, with 247 doctors, 77 nurses, and 366 nursing technicians. Additionally, there is the Monte Alverne Charitable Hospital, which in 2020 had 35 beds, none in the ICU, with 2 doctors, 4 nurses, and 13 technicians.

In terms of beds per 100,000 inhabitants, the municipality meets the SUS target but falls below the level set by the World Health Organization (WHO). Regarding infant mortality, the municipality's level is "alarming" according to the Organisation for Economic Co-operation and Development (OECD) classification, similar to the state and national levels.

=== Education ===
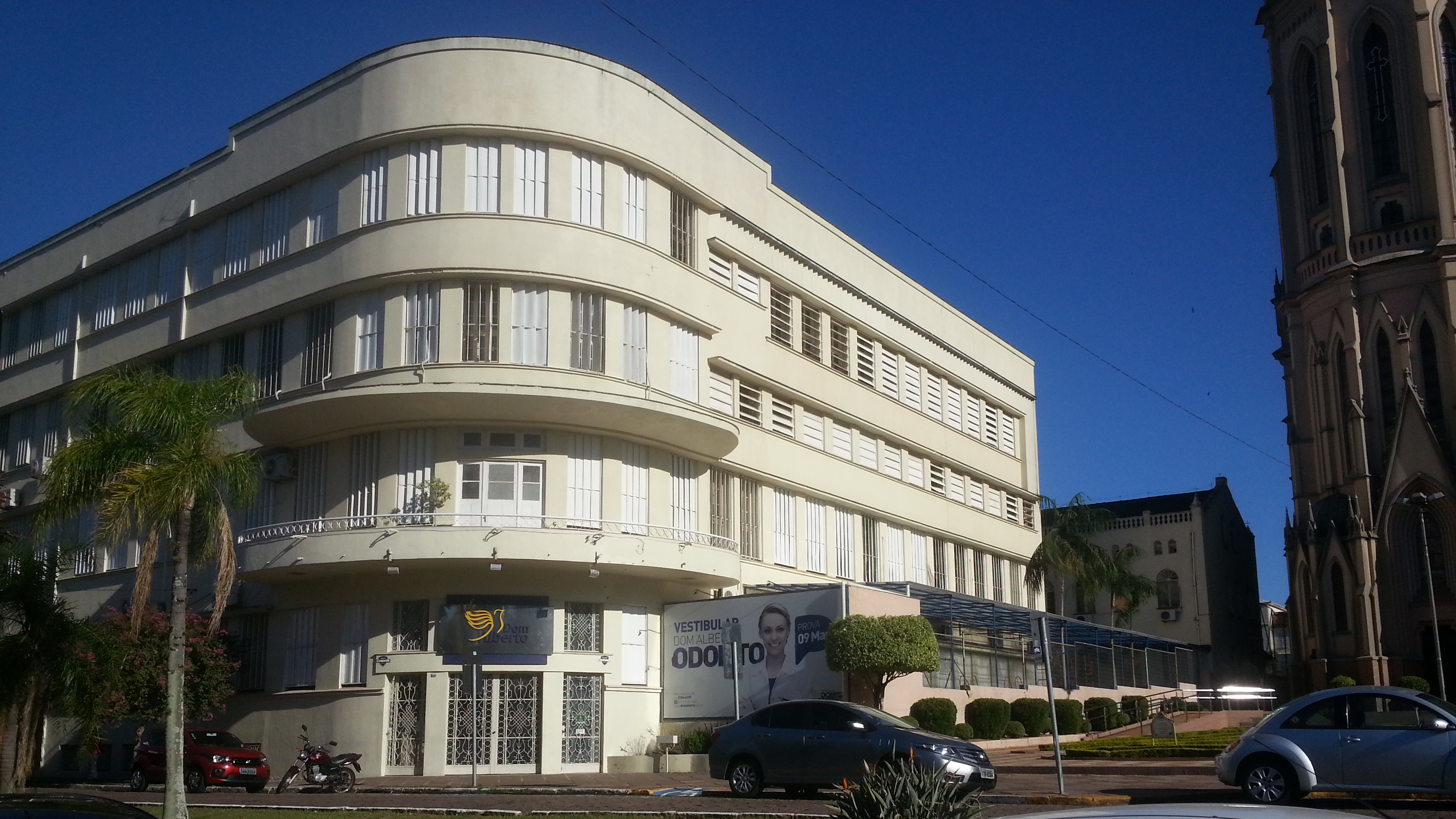
Facade of Dom Alberto College in 2019, with the cathedral to the right

In 2014, the city had 114 primary schools with 30,925 enrolled students. Of these, 5% studied in rural areas, and the rest in urban areas. 19.6% attended private schools, while the remainder were in municipal or state schools. The illiteracy rate among the population over fifteen years old was 8.42% in 2010. Additionally, 300 students are served in special education across all levels.

In 2013, fourteen schools offered high school classes, with 3,806 students enrolled in one of the three years. Of these, four were private, including Colégio Mauá, part of the Synodal Education Network, founded on July 27, 1870, by the local community, Colégio Marista São Luís, founded in 1874 and part of the Marista Network, and Colégio Educar-se, founded in 1984 by the institution that now manages UNISC. The other institutions are state-run, with only one located in a rural area. Among the state schools in the urban area are Colégio Goiás, founded in 1902, and Ernesto Alves State School. Vocational high school courses are also offered at UNISC, with 211 students enrolled in 2014, at SENAI, with 183 students in 2013, at the Santa Cruz Agricultural Family School, with 200 students in 2013, at Ideal School, with nine students in 2013, and at Colégio Marista, with 48 students in 2013.

Higher education in the city is provided by the University of Santa Cruz do Sul, with eleven thousand students enrolled in 52 undergraduate programs in 2014, Dom Alberto College, named after Alberto Frederico Etges and located in the former Coração de Jesus College building, with 2,500 students enrolled in three undergraduate programs, a branch of the Rio Grande do Sul State University (UERGS), with 36 students enrolled in two undergraduate programs, and a center of the Ritter dos Reis University Center (UniRitter), with 361 students enrolled in undergraduate programs in 2013.

In terms of the goals set by the Ministry of Education (MEC), the municipality performs well in the early grades but falls below the target in the final grades.

=== Transportation ===
Public transportation in the city is operated by the TCS Consortium, under a contract with the municipality, formed by the merger of the companies Stadtbus and TC Catedral, which operated until 2017 alongside the Primavera Consortium. The bus fleet is equipped with air conditioning, wheelchair lifts, a visual identification system for users, GPS, and an app that allows real-time bus tracking. Viação União Santa Cruz is responsible for intermunicipal public transportation. In private transportation, in addition to taxis, ride-hailing services have been operating in the city since the mid-2010s. The city also has seven bike lanes or cycleways, totaling 11.7 kilometres (7.3 mi) in length. In 2014, the city's vehicle fleet totaled 85,076, with most of them being cars. Traffic fatalities exceed the target set by the Sustainable Development Goals (SDGs).

For air transportation, there is the Santa Cruz do Sul Airport, whose runway was established in 1940, with regular airline services to Porto Alegre.

=== Security ===
The city's first prison was located in its central neighborhood—opened in 1910, it had wooden floors and ceilings and windows facing the sidewalk. To move inmates away from the center and enhance security, the municipality donated land to the state government in what is now the Faxinal Menino Deus neighborhood, then sparsely populated, for the construction of a new jail. Opened in 1977 with the transfer of prisoners from the center, the Santa Cruz Regional Prison has iron cells and masonry infrastructure, with an official capacity of 168 inmates in 2017, but housing 261. In 2017, it recorded the state's largest prison break, with 26 inmates escaping. The city is the headquarters of the Regional Command for Ostensive Policing in the Rio Pardo Valley, hosting the 23rd Military Police Battalion. It also houses a Federal Police station, an Integrated Public Safety and Citizenship Center, which brings together police stations and other public safety agencies, and the 6th Fire Department Battalion, with 252 members serving 61 municipalities in the region.

In 2017, the city recorded 18 homicides, 1,020 thefts, 254 robberies, 24 vehicle robberies, and 510 other crimes, representing about half the incidents compared to the previous year. Among the 30 cities with over 65,000 inhabitants in the state, Santa Cruz has the 26th highest overall crime rate, trailing only Santa Rosa, Cachoeira do Sul, Uruguaiana, and Bagé. Nevertheless, the number of homicides per 100,000 inhabitants is considered "epidemic" by the World Health Organization's classification.

=== Communications ===
The newspaper with the largest circulation in the city is Gazeta do Sul, which began circulation in 1941 under the name Kolonie, originally written in German. Also notable is the Riovale Jornal, in circulation since 1976. In radio, stations include Gazeta FM and Gazeta AM, as well as Atlântida FM, Arauto FM, among others. Regional television channels include Santa Cruz TV (community channel), Unisc TV (university channel), founded in 1996, and RBS TV Santa Cruz (part of RBS Group), founded in 1988.

== Housing and social projects ==
One of the main public housing initiatives in the city is the Viver Bem Residential Complex, a development constructed with funds from the Growth Acceleration Program under the Minha Casa, Minha Vida program, accommodating approximately 5,000 residents. Despite initial optimism, residents have expressed frustrations over delays in the delivery of completed homes, frequent flooding, and irregular occupations. Other public housing projects include the Mãe de Deus, Santa Maria, and Beckencamp developments.

Among the community initiatives with a significant presence in the city are the Associação de Pais e Amigos dos Excepcionais (APAE), the Lions Club, and the Women's Association Against Cancer.

== Culture ==
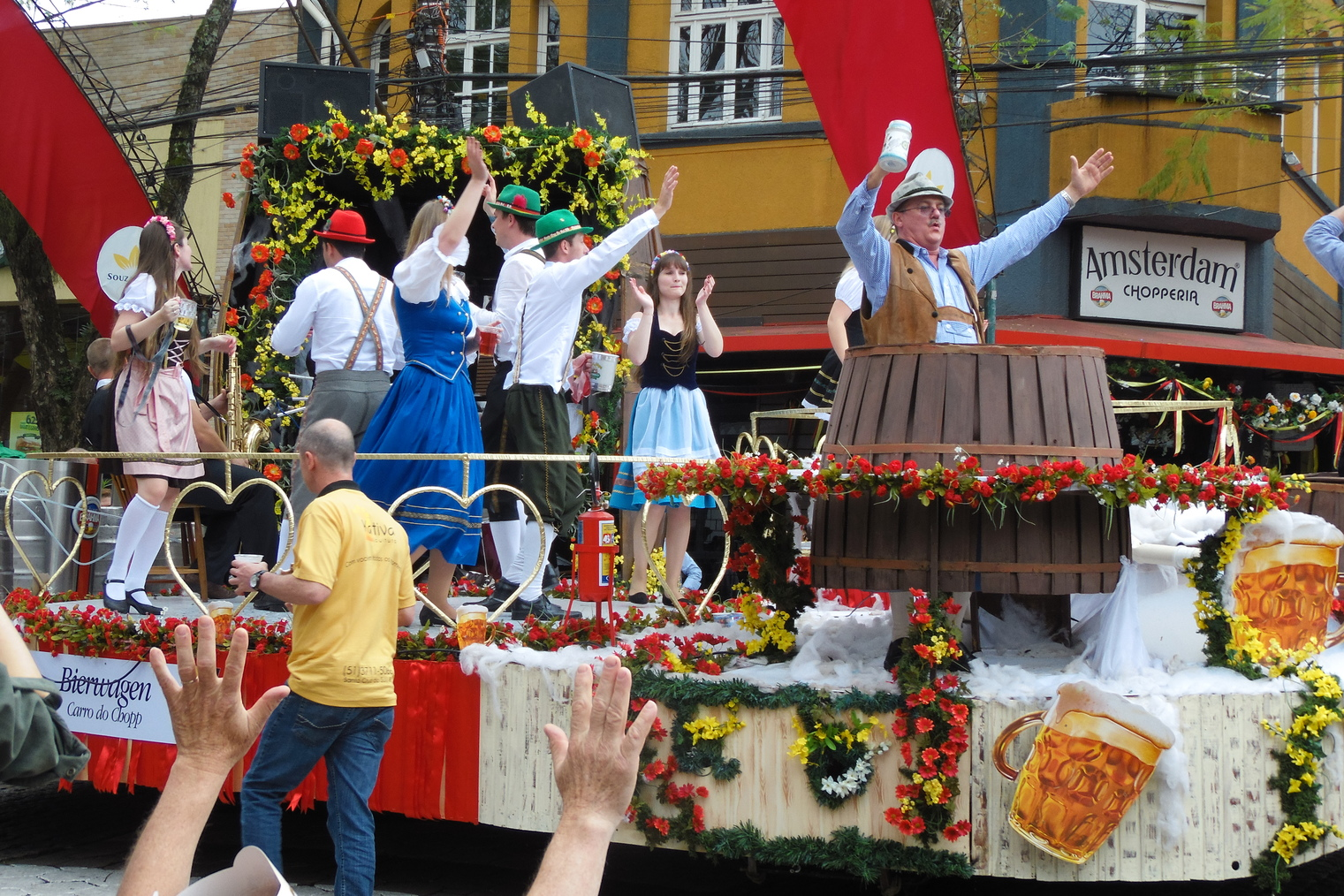
The bierwagen (beer wagon) at the Oktoberfest in 2013

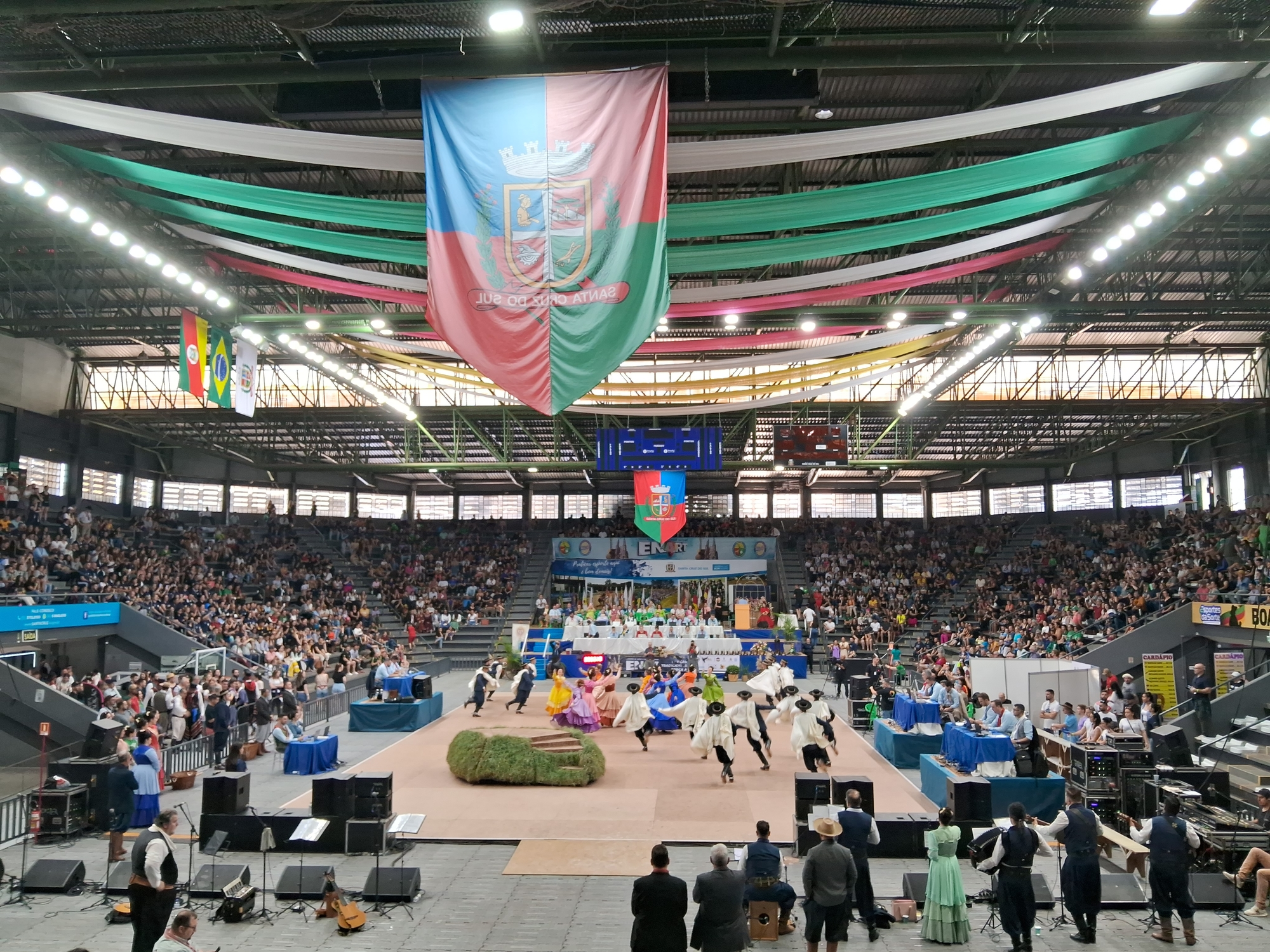
Traditional Gaucho dance performance at ENART 2023, held at the Arnão Sports Complex

The main languages spoken in the city are Portuguese, the official language of Brazil and used by the majority of the population, and German, including dialects such as Hunsrückisch, which was predominant among the colony's earliest settlers.

Among the city's cultural hubs is the Francisco José Frantz Cultural Center, located in the former municipal railway station, which hosts a variety of exhibitions. In the city center, the Regina Simonis House of Arts hosts art exhibitions organized by the Santa Cruz do Sul Pró-Cultura Association, established in 1988 by volunteers. The association has occupied the current building since 1994 under a commodate agreement with the state government, the property's owner. Constructed in 1922 to house the Banco Pelotense, the eclectic-style building spans 823 square meters in the city center and has also served as the Bank of the State of Rio Grande do Sul (from 1932 to 1982) and the State Tax Office (from 1983 to 1994). It is a designated heritage site. The architectural design, of unknown origin, is often attributed to the German engineer and architect Theo Wiederspahn. The facade features statues of figures from Roman mythology, centered around Mercury. The building's current name honors the artist Regina Simonis, born in 1900, the first Santa Cruz native to enroll in the Institute of Fine Arts of Rio Grande do Sul. Other cultural venues include the Auditorium of the Municipal Secretariat of Education and Culture and the Camarin Space Theater in the Mauá School auditorium. Private cultural establishments include the Mauá School Theater, with 711 seats, the auditoriums of Dom Alberto and São Luís schools, and those at UNISC. The Oktoberfest Park pavilions host various events, and the Santa Cruz Park features an amphitheater with 800 seats.

The city is also home to a public library and several private libraries open to the public, as well as a private museum with public access. The municipal public library had a collection of 21,000 works in 2012. The UNISC library, established in 1964 and one of the most significant in the state's interior, held 260,000 books in 2017, along with periodicals, regional newspaper archives, multimedia collections, and materials in Braille. The Educar-se Library, located at the private school of the same name maintained by APESC, has a collection of 13,700 volumes. The Mauá School Museum, founded in 1966, houses a collection of 140,000 items, including archaeological artifacts, historical objects, natural science specimens, a modest art gallery, and a collection of weapons.

The city is the home of the UNISC Chamber Orchestra, founded in 2005 initially as a school orchestra. Since then, the group has performed in the city and throughout the state.

Since 2018, the city has annually hosted the Santa Cruz Film Festival, an event that showcases and awards contemporary regional and national film productions. The festival is organized by Sesc/RS – Santa Cruz do Sul Unit, UNISC – Communication Studies Programs, and Pé de Coelho Filmes. Aimed at fostering film production and exhibition in the city, the festival brings Brazilian short films to Santa Cruz do Sul, aspiring to serve as a platform for the dissemination, premiere, and promotion of works from across the country. In addition to screenings, the festival offers workshops on audiovisual production, discussions, and tributes.

== Sports ==
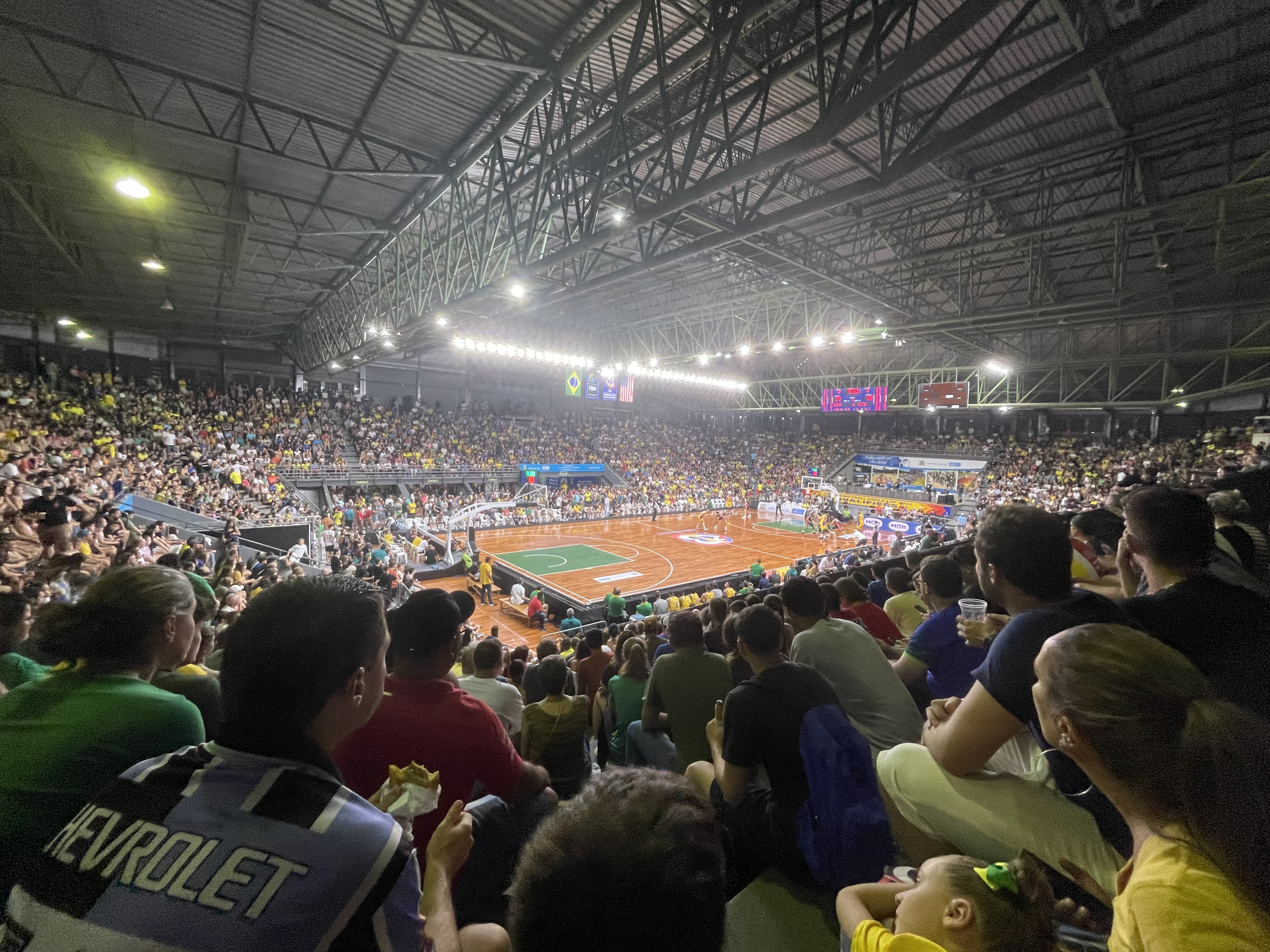
Arnão Sports Complex hosting a match between the Brazilian and American teams during the FIBA Basketball World Cup qualifiers in 2023

The Mayor Arno João Frantz Sports Complex, officially nicknamed Arnão in 2021 after being informally known as such, is one of the city's main sports complexes. Located in the Oktoberfest Park, it was inaugurated in 1992 by then-mayor Arno Frantz, after whom it is named. Another sports complex is located at UNISC. The city also hosts a tennis club and a golf course.

Two professional football clubs are based in the city: Esporte Clube Avenida and Futebol Clube Santa Cruz. Both have stadiums in the city, namely the Estádio dos Eucaliptos, built in 1950 with a capacity of 3,000 spectators, and the Estádio dos Plátanos. The first professional basketball club established in Santa Cruz was Sociedade Ginástica, founded in 1931. Currently, the Basquetebol do Esporte Clube União Corinthians, established in 1939, is the city's leading professional basketball club, with both men's and women's teams.

Notable athletes from the city include gymnast Natália Scherer, who represented Brazil in the rhythmic gymnastics finals at the 2000 Summer Olympics in Sydney, golfer Adilson da Silva, who competed for Brazil at the 2015 Pan American Games in Toronto, and other local residents and natives, such as Fabiano Peçanha.

== Leisure ==
Events celebrating both German and Gaucho cultures are traditionally held, with the most prominent being the Santa Cruz do Sul Oktoberfest and the Art and Tradition Encounter, respectively, along with their associated events. Other events include the Cuca Festival, centered on the German dish, which in its 23rd edition in 2023 drew 80,000 attendees, as well as events featuring beer producers from Rio Grande do Sul. Additionally, Carnival has been celebrated in the city since 1896, featuring balls, street parties, and samba school parades. Today, the main samba schools include Acadêmicos do União, founded in 1973 by members of the Sociedade Cultural e Beneficente (SCB) club, known as Uniãozinho, established in 1923 as a space for the city's Black community, as well as Imperadores do Ritmo, Imperatriz do Sol, Império da Zona Norte, and Unidos de Santa Cruz. Other notable street carnival groups from the early 20th century include Bam-Bam-Bam, Filhos do Inferno, and Turunas.

The city features several public squares, including Getúlio Vargas Square, established in 1855, which serves as the main gathering point for residents and hosts various events. In addition to robust tourism infrastructure, the city offers a vibrant culinary and nightlife scene. Among the notable establishments is the flagship location of the Heilige brewery, an award-winning brand.

== Notable people ==
- Edmar Hermany, mayor of Santa Cruz
- Ana Hickmann, Brazilian model
- Lucas Kohl, Brazilian racing driver
- Irton Marx, journalist and politician
- Henrique Mecking, Brazilian chess Grandmaster

== See also ==
- List of municipalities in Rio Grande do Sul

== Bibliography ==
- Oliveira, Gabriel Anibal Santos de (2017). Reestruturação urbana e mudanças na dinâmica e organização da área central de Santa Cruz do Sul - RS (PDF) (doctorate thesis). Universidade de Santa Cruz do Sul. Archived from the original (PDF) on 29 August 2023.
