= Universidade de Santa Cruz do Sul =

Brazilian university

The University of Santa Cruz do Sul (Portuguese: Universidade de Santa Cruz do Sul, UNISC) is a Brazilian non-profit (community) private university located in the city of Santa Cruz do Sul, in the state of Rio Grande do Sul, with four other campuses in Capão da Canoa, Sobradinho, Venâncio Aires, and Montenegro. The institution had its first college founded in 1964, but it was only in 1993 that it became a university. The university also has a preservation area named "RPPN da Unisc", which has an area of 221.39 hectares and was created in 2009, through Ordinance No. 16 of March 18, 2009.
