= Edmar Hermany =

Brazilian politician

Edmar Guilherme Hermany is a Brazilian politician.

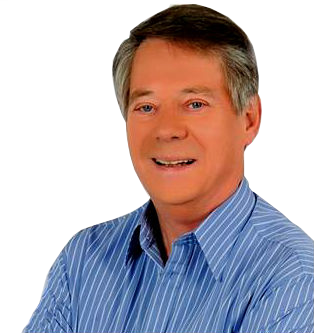
Edmar Guilherme Hermany

Born on 25 September 1946 (Formosa, now the district of Santa Cruz do Sul, Rio Grande do Sul), son of Edwaldo Waldemar Hermany and Romilda Hermina Hermany. He is married to Helena Hermany and father of three.

He majored in Law and Social Sciences at the Law School of the Universidade Federal de Santa Maria in 1975.

He joined politics in 1988 when he was elected as councilor for Santa Cruz do Sul. In his first term, he chaired the City Council for two years. During this period the City Council of Santa Cruz do Sul was elected by media outlets as the most austere state.

He ran for mayor and was elected in 1992. According to research done at the time, 96.6% of residents of Santa Cruz do Sul approved his management.

Between 1997 and 1998 he was Director of Interior Affairs of the Department of Public Works and Housing of the Government of Rio Grande do Sul.

== Awards and accolades ==
- Centro Cultural Vila Melos – Diploma de Sócio Honorário e Troféu Charrua;
- Medal of Civil Defense of Rio Grande do Sul;
- Medalha Marechal Mascarenhas de Moares;
- Certificate of Municipal Legislator and Latin American Integration;
- Certificado de “Amigo da Criança” - FEBEM-RS;
- Diploma de Amigo da Polícia Rodoviária;
- Diploma de Amigo de Nosso Batalhão;
- Diploma de Amigo da Brigada Militar;
- Diploma Collaboration Emeritus of Brazilian Army;
- TOP Ecologia 94 da ADVB pelo Projeto Souza Cruz Rio Pardinho;
- Diploma of Merit granted by the Uvergs (Union of Aldermen of Rio Grande do Sul) by majority vote in 2012.
