= Pardinho River =

Coordinates: 29°52′30″S 52°28′41″W

Pardinho

Location
- Country: Brazil
- State: Rio Grande do Sul
- Region: South America
- City: Sinimbu; Santa Cruz do Sul; Rio Pardo

Physical characteristics
- Source
  - location: Brazil
- Mouth
  - location: Rio Pardo, Brazil
- Length: 107 km (66 mi)

The Pardinho River is a river located in the state of Rio Grande do Sul, Brazil, having a length of 107 km.
