= Santa Cruz do Sul Airport =

Luiz Beck da Silva Airport Aeroporto Luiz Beck da Silva
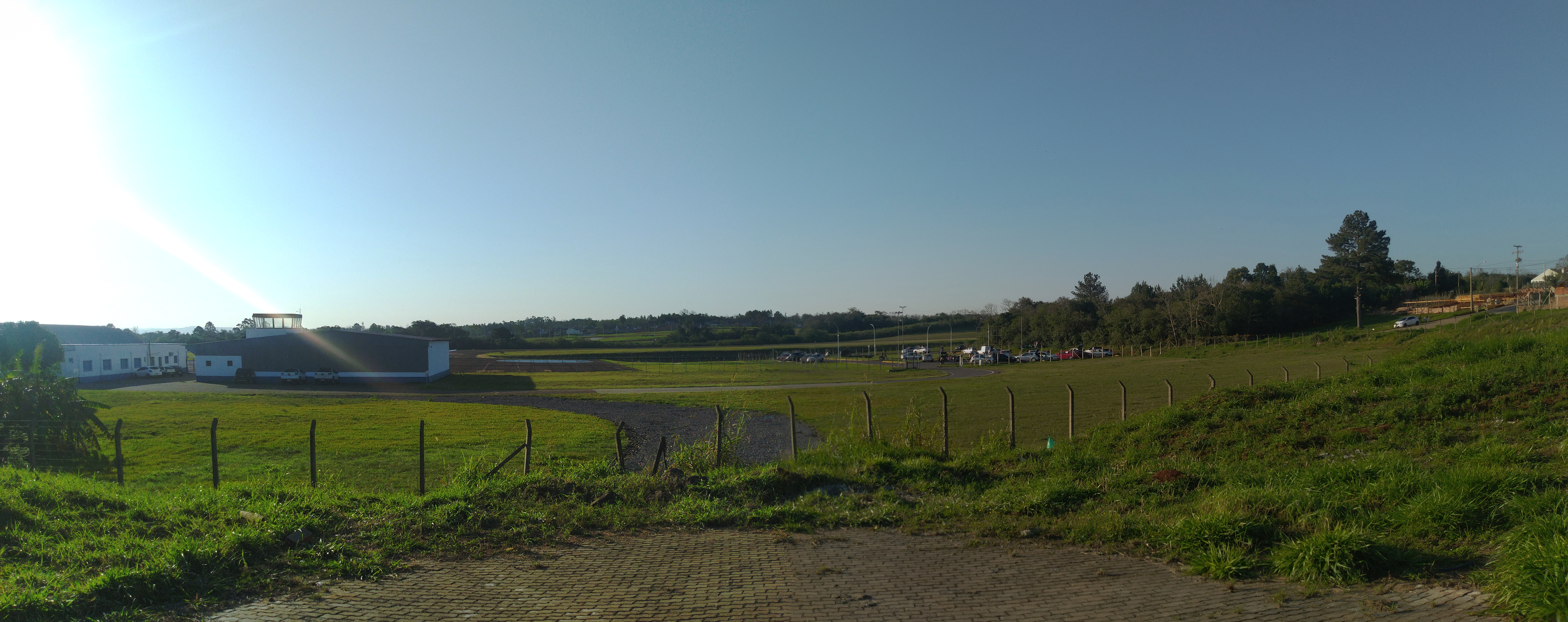
- IATA: CSU; ICAO: SSSC; LID: RS0029

Summary
- Airport type: Public
- Serves: Santa Cruz do Sul
- Time zone: BRT (UTC−03:00)
- Elevation AMSL: 199 m (653 ft)
- Coordinates: 29°41′03″S 052°24′44″W

Map
- Location in Brazil CSU (Brazil)

Runways
Direction	Length		Surface
Direction	m	ft	Surface
08/26	1,180	3,871	Asphalt
- Sources: ANAC, DECEA

Luiz Beck da Silva Airport (IATA: CSU, ICAO: SSSC), is the airport serving Santa Cruz do Sul, Brazil.

== Access ==
The airport is located 7 km (4 mi) from downtown Santa Cruz do Sul.

== See also ==
- List of airports in Brazil
