= Irton Marx =

Brazilian politician and activist (born 1947)

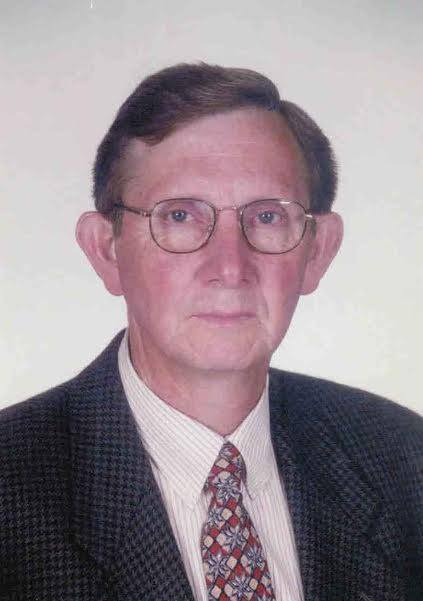

City councilor of Santa Cruz do Sul
- In office 2005–2008

Personal details
- Born: 1947 (age 78–79) Hamburg, Germany
- Party: PL; PSDB; SD
- Occupation: Journalist, politician, activist

Irton Marx (born 1947) is a Brazilian journalist, politician and activist. He is known for organizing a movement to separate the southernmost state of Brazil, Rio Grande do Sul, to form a new country called "Republic of the Pampa".

== Early life ==
Born in Hamburg, Germany, Irton came to Santa Cruz do Sul in 1947, aged just 11 months and 4 days. Along with his older brother, in addition to two others born in Brazil, he grew up in the region where a military base is located – where he even served in 1966. His parents worked in tobacco companies and, due to the persecution of German immigrants since the beginning of World War II, were discreet about the origins of the family.

== Political life and activism ==
He is the author of a book called A new country will be born: Republic of the Gaúcho Pampa about the separation of Rio Grande do Sul from Brazil. The project supposed that other neighbouring states with significant non-Portuguese population may secede from Brazil also for forming the Federal Republic of the Pampa.

Due to his ideas of having a country where German and Italian would be official languages along with Portuguese, in 1993, after an interview on the most popular Brazilian TV channel, Rede Globo, he was accused of racism, fascism and Nazism. He was considered innocent in all these accusations from Brazilian officials, and the accusers had to pay a value in money for causing him all the hassle.

In 1997, he decided to drop the "Pampa Independence Movement" for good.

In 2020, he ran for mayor of Santa Cruz do Sul for the Solidariedade party. He was not elected, receiving only 347 votes. On the afternoon of 31 August 2024, Marx was hit by a car, suffering fractures to his left leg and spine. He was hospitalized in Canoas. During his hospital stay, on 16 October, his house was robbed, resulting in "incalculable" losses.
