= Oktoberfest of Santa Cruz do Sul =

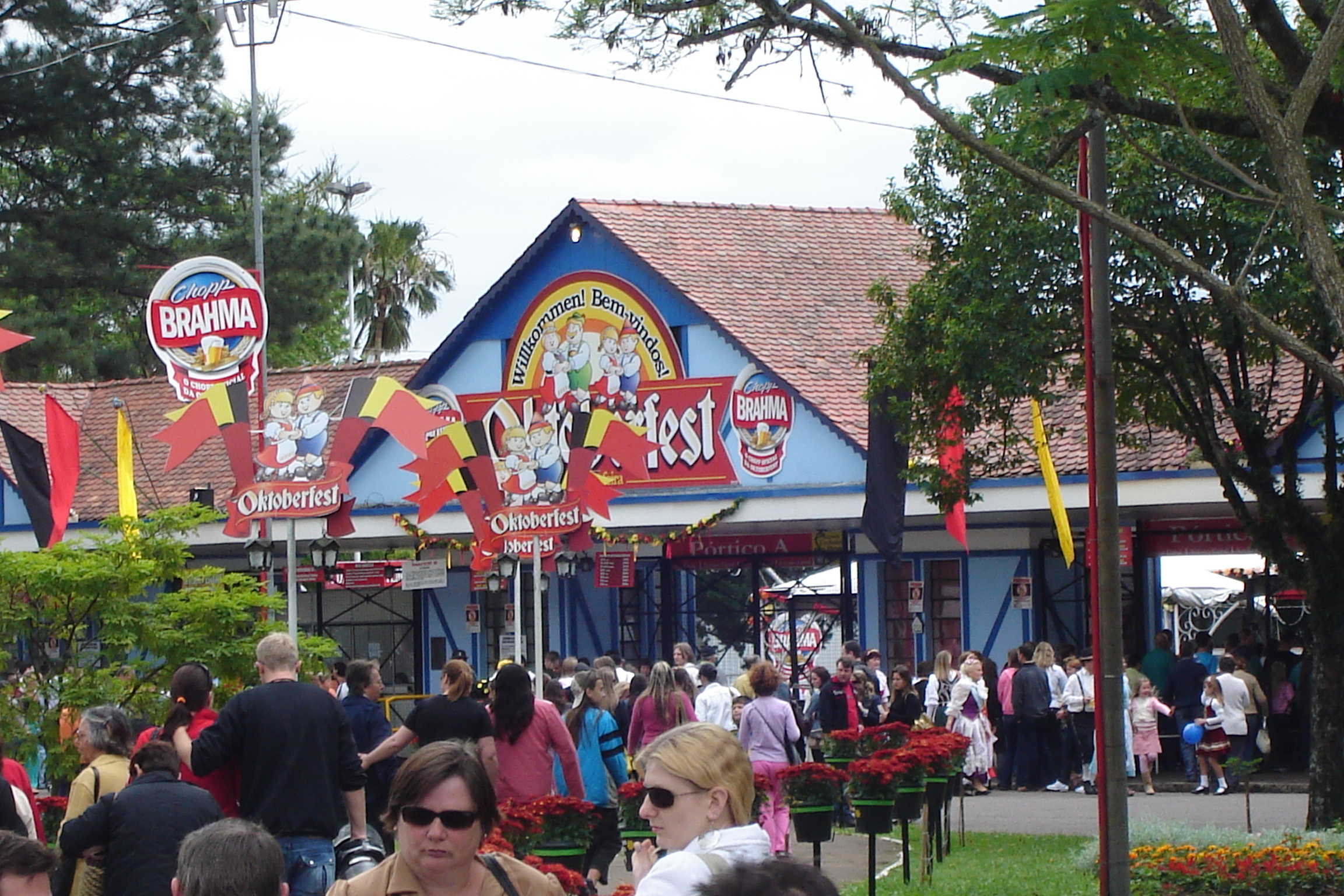
Brazilian Oktoberfest - entrance

The Oktoberfest of Santa Cruz do Sul is the Oktoberfest edition form the city of Santa Cruz do Sul, Rio Grande do Sul, Brazil. The first edition dates back to 1984, and since then a yearly edition has taken place, except in 1993, when the city was going through financial difficulties, and 2020 caused by COVID-19 pandemic. The last editions have been ten days long. In 2003, 464.900 people attended the event, consuming 210,000 liters (46,000 imp gal; 55,000 U.S. gal) of keg beer.

== Data ==
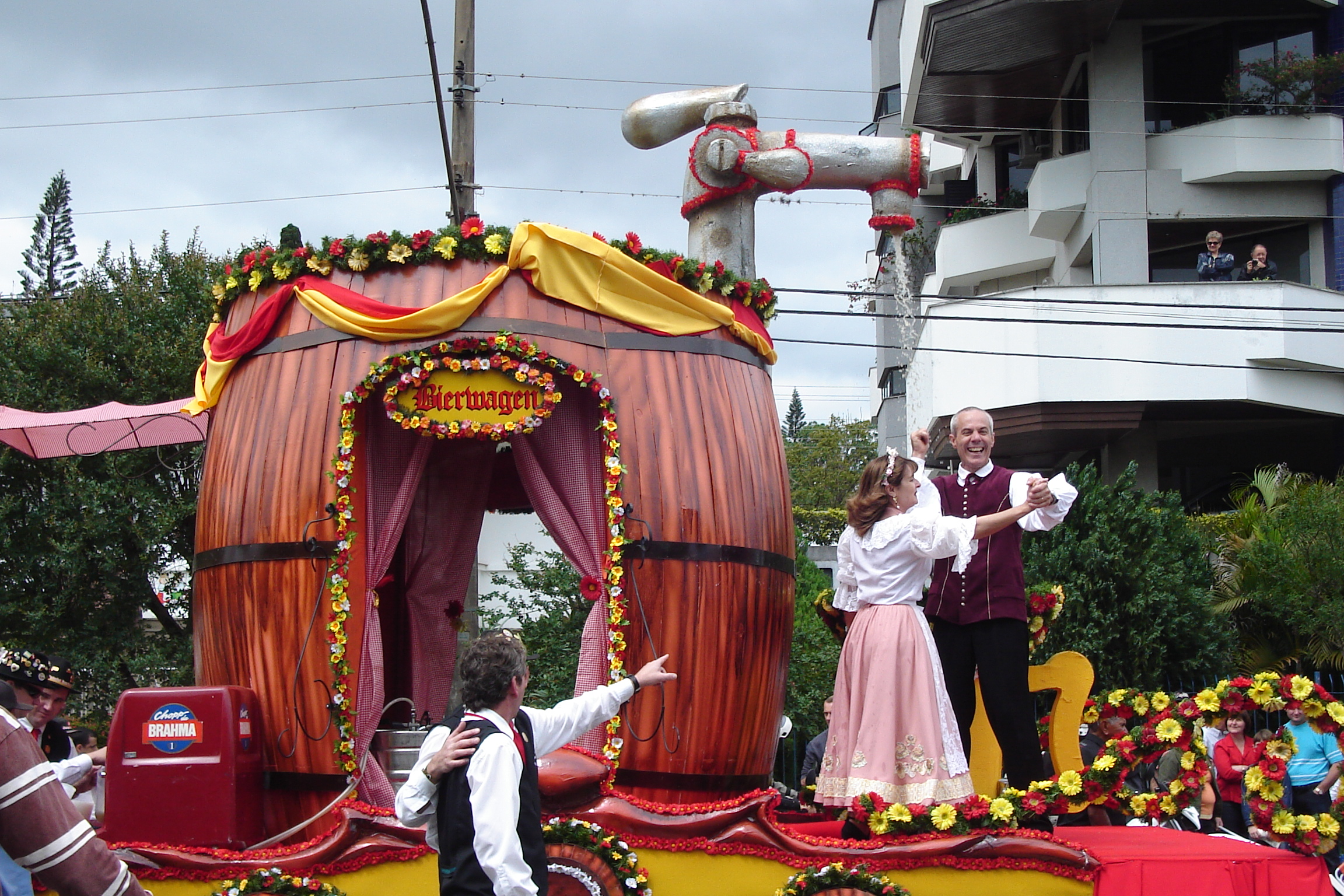
The Bierwagen from the 23rd edition distributing free beer for the participants of the parade

Data from the Oktoberfest of Santa Cruz do Sul
Edition	Year	Public	Keg beer brand	Keg beer consumed (liters)
1st	1984	140,000	Antarctica	63,500
2nd	1985	221,000	Brahma	109,000
3rd	1986	320,000	Brahma	120,000
4th	1987	381,000	Brahma	147,000
5th	1988	366,146	Brahma	160,000
6th	1989	420,000	Brahma	346,406
7th	1990	162,000	Brahma	208,000
8th	1991	121,634	Brahma	115,4000
9th	1992	127,000	—	28,851 (Note: And 61,989 liters of regular beer)
There was no edition in 1993 due to financial difficulties
10th	1994	194,000	Brahma, Antarctica	115,000
11th	1995	230,000	Brahma, Antarctica	150,000
12th	1996	282,600	Brahma, Antarctica	155,000
13th	1997	321,700	Antarctica, Schincariol	177,200
14th	1998	415,000	Antarctica, Brahma	228,000
15th	1999	385,000	Antarctica, Brahma	211,000
16th	2000	408,800	Antarctica, Schincariol	220,000
17th	2001	456,500	Antarctica, Schincariol	246,500
18th	2002	415,500	Ambev – Antarctica	265,900
19th	2003	464,900	Brahma	210,000
20th	2004	412,000	Kaiser, Heineken and Xingu	185,400
21st	2005	376,100	Brahma	206,000
22nd	2006	422,100	Brahma	177,000
23rd	2007	445,300	Brahma	230,000
24th	2008	455,000	Brahma	227,500
25th	2009	Unknown	Unknown	Unknown
26th	2010	140,400 payers	Unknown	Unknown
27th	2011	152,300 payers (Note: Approx. 400,000 visitors)	Unknown	Unknown
28th	2012	134,100 payers	Unknown	Unknown
29th	2013	134,200 payers	Unknown	Unknown
30th	2014	138,300 payers	Unknown	Unknown
31st	2015	130,000 payers	Unknown	Unknown
32nd	2016	150,000 payers (Note: Approximately)	Unknown	Unknown
36th	2020	Deferred to 2021 caused by the COVID-19 pandemic.		

== See also ==
- German colonization in Rio Grande do Sul
