= Taquari =

Municipality of Rio Grande do Sul, Brazil

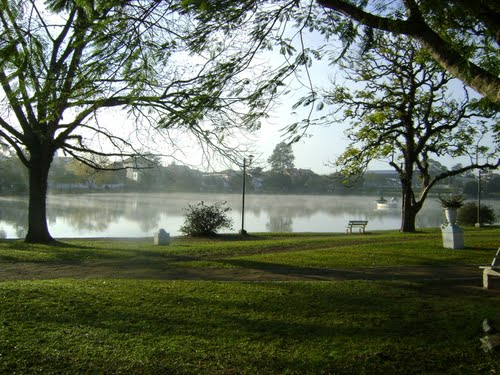
- Armenian Lagoon [Lagoa Armênia]

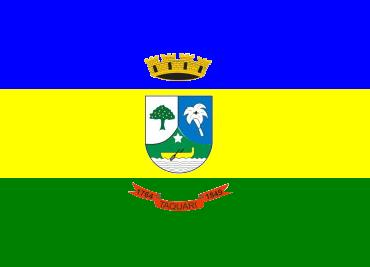
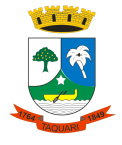
- Flag Coat of arms
- Nicknames: Taquari, people's land
- Location in Rio Grande do Sul, Brazil
- Coordinates: 29°48′00″S 51°51′35″W
- Country: Brazil
- Region: South
- State: Rio Grande do Sul
- Founded: 1849

Government
  - Mayor: Emanuel Hassen de Jesus (PT)

Area
  - Total: 349 km^{2} (135 sq mi)
- Elevation: 54 m (177 ft)

Population (2022)
  - Total: 25,198
- Time zone: UTC−3 (BRT)
- Website: Prefeitura de Taquary

Taquari is a municipality in the state of Rio Grande do Sul, Brazil.

== Climate ==
Climate data for Taquari (1976–2005)
Month	Jan	Feb	Mar	Apr	May	Jun	Jul	Aug	Sep	Oct	Nov	Dec	Year
Record high °C (°F)	36.4 (97.5)	35.7 (96.3)	34.9 (94.8)	32.2 (90.0)	29.4 (84.9)	28.0 (82.4)	28.9 (84.0)	30.2 (86.4)	31.3 (88.3)	33.3 (91.9)	34.9 (94.8)	36.0 (96.8)	36.4 (97.5)
Mean daily maximum °C (°F)	30.5 (86.9)	30.0 (86.0)	28.7 (83.7)	25.3 (77.5)	22.0 (71.6)	19.3 (66.7)	19.3 (66.7)	20.4 (68.7)	21.8 (71.2)	24.7 (76.5)	27.0 (80.6)	29.3 (84.7)	24.9 (76.7)
Daily mean °C (°F)	24.9 (76.8)	24.7 (76.5)	23.4 (74.1)	20.1 (68.2)	16.8 (62.2)	14.5 (58.1)	14.5 (58.1)	15.3 (59.5)	16.8 (62.2)	19.4 (66.9)	21.4 (70.5)	23.6 (74.5)	19.6 (67.3)
Mean daily minimum °C (°F)	19.3 (66.7)	19.4 (66.9)	18.2 (64.8)	14.9 (58.8)	11.7 (53.1)	9.7 (49.5)	9.6 (49.3)	10.2 (50.4)	11.8 (53.2)	14.1 (57.4)	15.8 (60.4)	17.8 (64.0)	14.4 (57.9)
Record low °C (°F)	13.5 (56.3)	13.9 (57.0)	12.0 (53.6)	7.6 (45.7)	4.0 (39.2)	1.3 (34.3)	1.1 (34.0)	2.3 (36.1)	4.0 (39.2)	7.0 (44.6)	9.4 (48.9)	12.0 (53.6)	1.1 (34.0)
Average precipitation mm (inches)	148 (5.8)	127 (5.0)	118 (4.6)	116 (4.6)	117 (4.6)	124 (4.9)	149 (5.9)	123 (4.8)	149 (5.9)	179 (7.0)	131 (5.2)	135 (5.3)	1,616 (63.6)
Average relative humidity (%)	77	79	81	84	85	86	85	83	81	79	75	74	81
Source 1: Empresa Brasileira de Pesquisa Agropecuária (EMBRAPA)
Source 2: Climatempo (precipitation)

== See also ==
- List of municipalities in Rio Grande do Sul
