= Grenal =

Rivalry between Brazilian football clubs Grêmio and Internacional

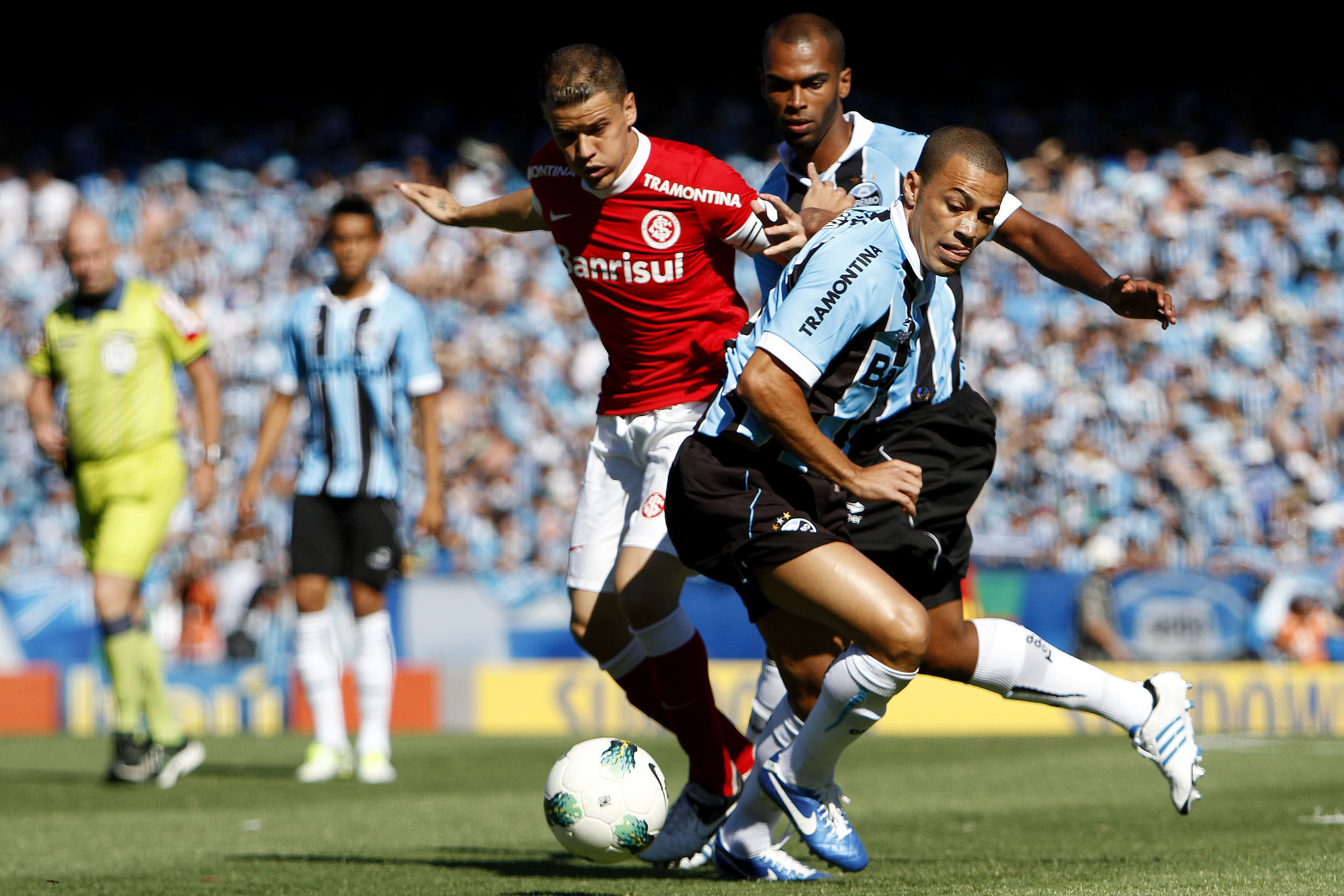
- A Grenal being contested at the Estádio Olímpico Monumental in 2012

- Grêmio Internacional
- Other names: Gre-Nal
- Location: Porto Alegre, Brazil
- Teams: Grêmio; Internacional
- First meeting: 18 July 1909; Friendly match Grêmio 10–0 Internacional
- Latest meeting: 11 October 2026; Brazil Série A Grêmio 1–1 Internacional
- Stadiums: Arena do Grêmio (Grêmio); Beira-Rio (Internacional)

Statistics
- Total meetings: 455
- Top scorer: Carlitos (40)
- All-time record: Internacional: 166; Grêmio: 144; Draws: 145

Grêmio	Internacional

The Grenal (also Gre-Nal, plural Grenais) is the rivalry between Grêmio and Internacional, the biggest Brazilian football clubs in the city of Porto Alegre. Ongoing since 1909, it is usually contested in the Campeonato Gaúcho, the Rio Grande do Sul premier state league that both teams have won regularly since 1940, and in the Campeonato Brasileiro Série A, the top-level national championship.

Being among the football derbies in Brazil, South America and the world, Grenais are considered a key cultural aspect of the Southern region of Brazil and particularly Rio Grande do Sul. High reactions and occasional violence accompany such matches.

In December 2020, FourFourTwo ranked the Grenal as the football world's 8th biggest derby.

== History ==
Many well-known players have contested the Grenal, including Everaldo, Tesourinha, Aírton, Falcão, Éder, Valdomiro, Renato Gaúcho, Cláudio Taffarel, Dunga, Emerson, Carlos Gamarra, Ronaldinho, Elías Figueroa, Andrés D'Alessandro, Lucas Leiva, Marcelo Moreno, Rafael Santos Borré, Nilmar, Pedro Geromel, Oscar, Walter Kannemann, Alexandre Pato, Alisson Becker, Arthur Melo, Everton Soares, Gabriel Mercado, Douglas Costa, Taison, Fernandão, Diego Forlán, Diego Costa, Martin Braithwaite and Luis Suárez, as well as world-famous coaches like Luiz Felipe Scolari, Abel Braga, Renato Gaúcho, Carlos Alberto Parreira, Telê Santana, Rubens Minelli, Valdir Espinosa, Paulo César Carpegiani and Ênio Andrade.

=== The first Grenal ===
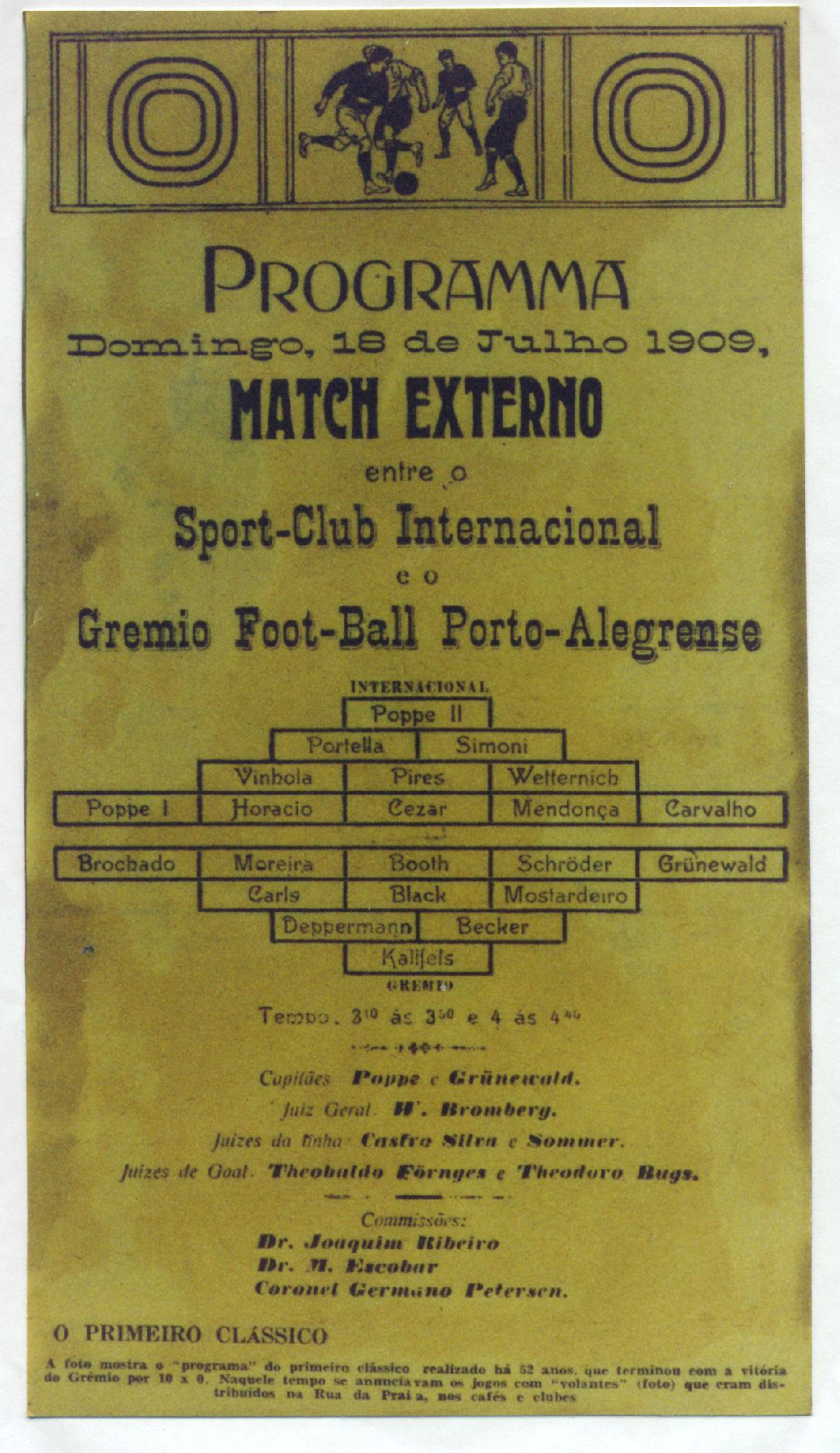
Matchday programme of the first Grenal in 1909

On June 21, 1909, four representatives of Internacional met with their Grêmio equivalents in the Leopoldina Portoalegrense building to arrange the first meeting between the two clubs. Internacional, founded two months before, invited Grêmio to be its first opponents. The first match was held on June 27. With a game of Fuss-Ball [sic] previously arranged, Grêmio's president, Major Augusto Koch said that his team would face Internacional with the second table (reserve team). The leaders of Internacional demanded that their opponents played with their first team. Grêmio's board agreed. However, as the club's fixture list was full, the game would be held only in the following month.

The first Grenal occurred on Sunday, July 18, 1909, at Grêmio's Baixada Stadium. At 15:10, both teams entered the field of Baixada, preceded by the Presidents and the military band of the Brigade. The Grêmio players wore Sorority shirts divided vertically in half blue and half white, with black shorts. Internacional wore vertically striped shirts in red and white, with white shorts. The audience was estimated to be at 2000.

The referee was Waldemar Bromberg, assisted by João de Castro e Silva and H. Sommer, as well as "goal judges" Theobaldo Foernges Bugs and Theodoro. As there were no nets, said goal judges sat on a stool beside the goals indicating whether the ball had entered the goal or not.

After 10 minutes, Edgar Booth scored the first goal of the game and in the history of the derby. Edgar Booth went on to score four more goals. Four goals were scored by Júlio Grünewald and one by Moreira. The match ended at 10–0 to Grêmio, the biggest win in the history of Grenal.

=== Grenal of the Century ===
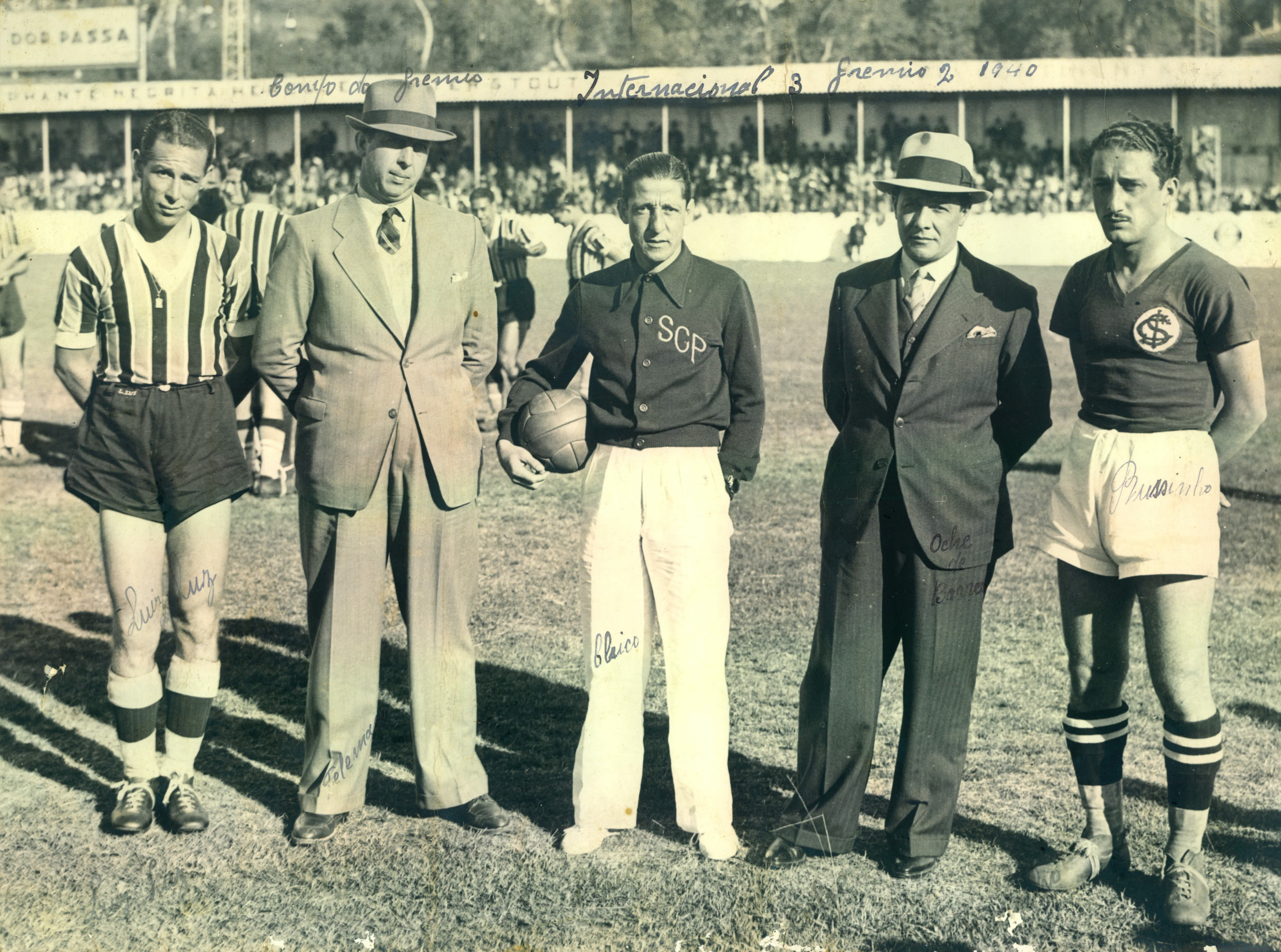
Grenal in 1940 for the Porto Alegre City Championship

This match took place at Beira-Rio Stadium on February 12, 1989, being the 297th confrontation between these rival clubs, and it is called "Grenal of the Century" due to its unprecedented importance: it was the second leg of the semi-finals of 1988 Brazilian Championship, soon after the first leg, played at Olímpico Stadium, had ended with no goals.

Both teams came from great campaigns in the league. Internacional had a slight advantage, for if the match ended in a draw, Inter would qualify for the finals and 1989 Copa Libertadores. Teasers and agitation ruled in Porto Alegre.

The attendance was 78,083, in spite of the scorching heat of the summer afternoon: the thermometers marked 40 °C (104 °F).

Grêmio started the match playing better and, at the end of the first half, was winning the match by 1–0 with a goal scored by Marcus Vinicius at 25 minutes. With the red card showed to Inter's right back Casemiro at 38 minutes by referee Arnaldo Cézar Coelho, Grêmio's victory seemed very close.

Inter got better in the second half. At 61 minutes, a free kick favored Inter. Midfielder Edu Lima crossed the ball and Nílson, top scorer of the league, scored to make the match even.

It was Inter who kept pressing, and minutes after, in a counter-attack from the right side, midfielder Maurício passed through two defenders and shot. The ball was going to miss the goal when Nílson appeared behind the back of Grêmio's defense, to score again.

Internacional won the "Grenal of the Century" and qualified to the final match against Esporte Clube Bahia.

=== Other matches ===
The 435th Grenal, due to be held on Saturday, February 26, 2022, was postponed after fans of Internacional attacked Grêmio's bus with iron bars and rocks, which left Paraguayan Mathías Villasanti with a concussion. This would become the first-ever instance of a Grenal's postponement.

== State rivalry ==
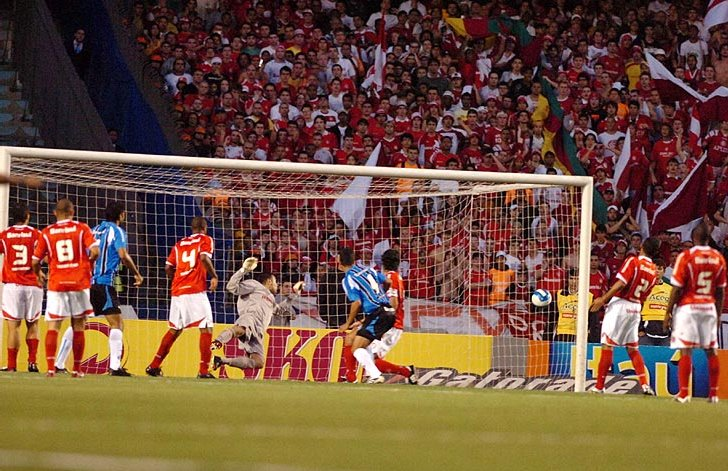
Grenal in 2007

The rivalry of the Grenal reaches beyond football; it is a cultural reference for the Gaúchos. Football fans residing in Porto Alegre and rest the state of Rio Grande do Sul, as well as in much of Santa Catarina, Western Paraná and Northern Uruguay, identify strongly with either club, according to entrenched familial, cultural and social-demographic factors.

Grêmio was founded in 1903 by German immigrants from the Porto Alegre's industrious and commercial upper middle-class, mainly from the northern neighbourhoods from the city, who initially banned poor non-German players. Inter was founded by the children of Italian immigrants, in a meeting at the Second District, a bohemian, commercial and college neighborhood, so most of the first Inter players and supporters came from this reality: students from inner Rio Grande do Sul, Italian and Azorean immigrants that lived on the place. Inter has accepted black players since the early 1930s, while Grêmio only accepted black players such as Ronaldinho and Everaldo since the 1950s.

== Statistics ==
=== Head to head results ===
Competition	Matches	Wins		Draws
Competition	Matches	GRE	INT	Draws
Campeonato Gaúcho	183	56	61	66
Campeonato Citadino	102	39	44	19
Copa Sul	2	0	1	1
Campeonato Sul-Brasileiro	2	1	0	1
Copa Sul-Minas	1	0	0	1
Primeira Liga	1	0	0	1
Campeonato Brasileiro Série A	76	25	26	25
Copa do Brasil	4	1	0	3
Seletiva Nacional da Libertadores	2	0	0	2
Copa CONMEBOL Libertadores	2	1	0	1
Copa CONMEBOL Sudamericana	4	1	1	2
Other friendly tournaments and games	76	20	33	23
All matches	455	144	166	145

=== Summary by decade ===
Decade	Matches	Grêmio wins	Inter wins	Draws
1900–1909	1	1	0	0
1910–1919	12	7	5	0
1920–1929	18	11	4	3
1930–1939	30	14	10	6
1940–1949	49	7	32	10
1950–1959	40	11	16	13
1960–1969	42	16	13	13
1970–1979	59	12	24	23
1980–1989	50	16	13	21
1990–1999	43	14	12	17
2000–2009	34	10	13	11
2010–2019	44	13	14	17
2020–2029	32	12	10	11
Total	455	144	166	145

=== Statistics in the Campeonato Brasileiro Série A ===
==== Summary by stadium ====
Stadium	Matches	Grêmio wins	Draws	Inter wins	Grêmio goals	Inter goals
Beira-Rio	41	14	6	21	34	43
Olímpico Monumental	22	7	11	4	18	18
Arena do Grêmio	11	4	7	0	18	6
Centenário (Caxias do Sul)	1	0	1	0	2	2
Couto Pereira (Curitiba)	1	0	0	1	0	1
Total (Note: Includes the Torneio Roberto Gomes Pedrosa (1967–1970))	76	25	25	26	72	70

==== Head-to-head ranking (2003–present) ====
P.	03	04	05	06	07	08	09	10	11	12	13	14	15	16	17	18	19	20	21	22	23	24	25
1																							
2			2	2		2	2				2							2		2	2		
3				3						3		3	3			3							
4								4							4	4	4						
5									5				5									5	
6	6				6	6												6					
7								7				7					7						
8		8					8																
9														9							9		9
10										10													
11					11																		
12									12										12				
13											13												
14																						14	
15																							
16																							16
17														17					17				
18																							
19																							
20	20																						
21																							
22																							
23																							
24		24																					
Série B
1			1																				
2															2					2			

• Total: Internacional 12 times higher, Grêmio 11 times higher.

==== Doubles in the Série A (2003–present) ====
Season	Team	Home result	Away result
2004	Internacional	2–0	1–3
2007	Grêmio	1–0	0–2
2024	Internacional	1–0	0–1

=== List of finals between the clubs ===
Season	Competition	Date	Match	Score	Winner
1950	Campeonato Citadino de Porto Alegre	27 December 1950	Inter – Grêmio	4–3	Internacional
1950	Campeonato Citadino de Porto Alegre	30 December 1950	Grêmio – Inter	0–1	Internacional
1962	Campeonato Gaúcho	7 February 1963	Grêmio – Inter	4–2	Grêmio
1976	Campeonato Gaúcho	22 August 1976	Inter – Grêmio	2–0	Internacional
1977	Campeonato Gaúcho	25 September 1977	Grêmio – Inter	1–0	Grêmio
1978	Campeonato Gaúcho	17 December 1978	Grêmio – Inter	1–2	Internacional
1991	Campeonato Gaúcho	1 December 1991	Grêmio – Inter	0–1	Internacional (Note: Internacional won the finals for having the best season record, as the aggregate score was not taken into account.)
1991	Campeonato Gaúcho	8 December 1991	Inter – Grêmio	0–2	Internacional
1991	Campeonato Gaúcho	15 December 1991	Inter – Grêmio	0–0	Internacional
1992	Campeonato Gaúcho	20 December 1992	Grêmio – Inter	1–3	Internacional
1992	Campeonato Gaúcho	23 December 1992	Inter – Grêmio	0–0	Internacional
1995	Campeonato Gaúcho	6 August 1995	Inter – Grêmio	1–1	Grêmio
1995	Campeonato Gaúcho	13 August 1995	Grêmio – Inter	2–1	Grêmio
1997	Campeonato Gaúcho	29 June 1997	Grêmio – Inter	1–1	Internacional
1997	Campeonato Gaúcho	2 July 1997	Inter – Grêmio	1–0	Internacional
1999	Campeonato Gaúcho	13 June 1999	Inter – Grêmio	1–0	Grêmio
1999	Campeonato Gaúcho	16 June 1999	Grêmio – Inter	2–0	Grêmio
1999	Campeonato Gaúcho	20 June 1999	Grêmio – Inter	1–0	Grêmio
2006	Campeonato Gaúcho	1 April 2006	Grêmio – Inter	0–0	Grêmio
2006	Campeonato Gaúcho	9 April 2006	Inter – Grêmio	1–1	Grêmio
2010	Campeonato Gaúcho	25 April 2010	Inter – Grêmio	0–2	Grêmio
2010	Campeonato Gaúcho	2 May 2010	Grêmio – Inter	0–1	Grêmio
2011	Campeonato Gaúcho	8 May 2011	Inter – Grêmio	2–3	Internacional
2011	Campeonato Gaúcho	15 May 2011	Grêmio – Inter	2–3 (4–5 p)	Internacional
2014	Campeonato Gaúcho	30 March 2014	Grêmio – Inter	1–2	Internacional
2014	Campeonato Gaúcho	13 April 2014	Inter – Grêmio	4–1	Internacional
2015	Campeonato Gaúcho	26 April 2015	Grêmio – Inter	0–0	Internacional
2015	Campeonato Gaúcho	3 May 2015	Inter – Grêmio	2–1	Internacional
2019	Campeonato Gaúcho	14 April 2019	Inter – Grêmio	0–0	Grêmio
2019	Campeonato Gaúcho	17 April 2019	Grêmio – Inter	0–0 (3–2 p)	Grêmio
2021	Campeonato Gaúcho	16 May 2021	Inter – Grêmio	1–2	Grêmio
2021	Campeonato Gaúcho	23 May 2021	Grêmio – Inter	1–1	Grêmio
2025	Campeonato Gaúcho	8 March 2025	Grêmio – Inter	0–2	Internacional
2025	Campeonato Gaúcho	16 March 2025	Inter – Grêmio	1–1	Internacional
2026	Campeonato Gaúcho	1 March 2026	Grêmio – Inter	3–0	Grêmio
2026	Campeonato Gaúcho	8 March 2026	Inter – Grêmio	1–1	Grêmio

• Finals won: Internacional 10, Grêmio 9.

== Records ==
=== Largest wins ===
Winning margin	Result	Date	Competition
10	Grêmio 10–0 Internacional	18 July 1909	Friendly match
9	Internacional 1–10 Grêmio	18 June 1911	Campeonato Citadino
7	Grêmio 0–7 Internacional	17 October 1948	Campeonato Citadino
6	Grêmio 6–0 Internacional	23 June 1912	Campeonato Citadino
6	Grêmio 0–6 Internacional	1 November 1938	Taça Martel
5	Grêmio 5–0 Internacional	17 July 1910	Campeonato Citadino
5	Internacional 6–1 Grêmio	30 July 1916	Campeonato Citadino
5	Grêmio 1–6 Internacional	4 January 1940	Campeonato Citadino
5	Grêmio 5–0 Internacional	9 August 2015	Campeonato Brasileiro

=== Longest unbeaten runs ===
Games	Club	Period	Results
17	Internacional	17 October 1971 – 13 July 1975	10 wins and 7 draws
16	Internacional	1 May 1947 – 7 September 1949	11 wins and 5 draws
13	Grêmio	16 June 1999 – 26 October 2002	8 wins and 5 draws
12	Internacional	11 January 1942 – 28 May 1944	9 wins and 3 draws
12	Grêmio	31 May 1987 – 9 February 1989	6 wins and 6 draws
11	Internacional	17 August 1952 – 9 January 1955	7 wins and 4 draws
11	Grêmio	17 March 2019 – 3 October 2020	6 wins and 5 draws

=== Most consecutive wins ===
Games	Club	Period
6	Grêmio	18 July 1909 – 8 June 1913
6	Grêmio	14 September 1919 – 27 April 1924
6	Grêmio	28 July 1931 – 13 August 1933
6	Grêmio	14 August 1977 – 20 August 1978
5	Internacional	11 July 1943 – 28 May 1944
5	Internacional	1 May 1947 – 26 October 1947
5	Internacional	1 November 1953 – 26 September 1954
5	Internacional	24 March 1974 – 13 July 1975

=== All-time top scorers ===
Goals	Player	Club
40	Carlitos	Internacional
21	Villalba	Internacional
18	Luiz Carvalho	Grêmio
16	Adãozinho	Internacional
16	Tesourinha	Internacional
12	Alcindo	Grêmio
11	Acácio	Internacional
11	Bodinho	Internacional
11	Foguinho	Grêmio

=== Highest attendances ===
- At the Beira-Rio Stadium (Internacional): Internacional 1–1 Grêmio; 85,075; 30 May 1971; Campeonato Gaúcho.
- At the Olímpico Stadium (Grêmio): Grêmio 1–1 Internacional, 72,893; 29 November 1981; Campeonato Gaúcho.
- At the Arena do Grêmio (Grêmio): Grêmio 3–1 Internacional, 55,376; 3 September 2026; Copa do Brasil.

== Honours ==
Competition	Grêmio		Internacional	
Competition	Titles	Years	Titles	Years
Brazilian Championship	2	1981, 1996	3	1975, 1976, 1979
Brazil Cup	5	1989, 1994, 1997, 2001, 2016	1	1992
Brazil Supercup	1	1990	0	
Copa Libertadores	3	1983, 1995, 2017	2	2006, 2010
Copa Sudamericana	0		1	2008
Recopa Sudamericana	2	1996, 2018	2	2007, 2011
Suruga Bank Championship	0		1	2009
FIFA Club World Cup/Intercontinental Cup (Note: Although the Intercontinental Cup and the FIFA Club World Cup are officially different competitions, in Brazil they are often treated as the same tournament.)	1	1983	1	2006
Total	14		11	
Torneio Heleno Nunes (Note: The Torneio Heleno Nunes is not considered a major title, as the criterion for participation was the elimination of clubs in the Brazilian Championship, that is, it "rewarded failure" of participants in another competition.)	0		1	1984
Campeonato Sul Brasileiro	1	1962	0	
Copa Sul	1	1999	0	
Rio Grande do Sul State Championship	44	1921, 1922, 1926, 1931, 1932, 1946, 1949, 1956, 1957, 1958, 1959, 1960, 1962, 1963, 1964, 1965, 1966, 1967, 1968, 1977, 1979, 1980, 1985, 1986, 1987, 1988, 1989, 1990, 1993, 1995, 1996, 1999, 2001, 2006, 2007, 2010, 2018, 2019, 2020, 2021, 2022, 2023, 2024, 2026	46	1927, 1934, 1940, 1941, 1942, 1943, 1944, 1945, 1947, 1948, 1950, 1951, 1952, 1953, 1955, 1961, 1969, 1970, 1971, 1972, 1973, 1974, 1975, 1976, 1978, 1981, 1982, 1983, 1984, 1991, 1992, 1994, 1997, 2002, 2003, 2004, 2005, 2008, 2009, 2011, 2012, 2013, 2014, 2015, 2016, 2025
FGF Cup	1	2006	2	2009, 2010
Recopa Gaúcha	5	2019, 2021, 2022, 2023, 2025	2	2016, 2017
Total general	66		62	
