= Sylvio Pirillo =

Brazilian footballer

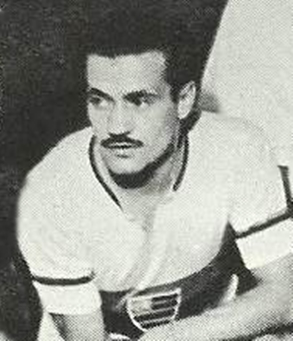

Personal information
- Full name: Sylvio Pirillo Cesarino
- Date of birth: 27 July 1916
- Place of birth: Porto Alegre, Brazil
- Date of death: 22 April 1991 (aged 74)
- Place of death: Porto Alegre, Brazil
- Position: Striker

Senior career*
Years	Team	Apps	(Gls)
1934–1935	Americano-RS	16	(9)
1936–1939	Internacional	31	(27)
1939–1940	Peñarol	?	(8)
1941–1947	Flamengo	113	(116)
1948–1952	Botafogo	43	(27)

International career
1942	Brazil	5	(6)

Managerial career
- 1952: Botafogo
- 1953–1955: Bonsucesso
- 1955: Náutico
- 1956–1958: Fluminense
- 1957: Brazil
- 1959: Internacional
- 1959–1960: Corinthians
- 1962: Brazil Olympic
- 1963–1964: Palmeiras
- 1965: Juventus
- 1967–1968: São Paulo
- 1969: Ferroviário-PR
- 1970: Náutico
- 1972: Bahia
- 1974: Desportiva Ferroviária
- 1974–1975: Corinthians
- 1977: Paysandu
- 1979: Santo André
- 1980: Rio Claro
- * Club domestic league appearances and goals

Sylvio Pirillo Cesarino (or Sílvio Pirillo) (27 July 1916 in Porto Alegre – 22 April 1991 in Porto Alegre) was a Brazilian football striker.

Pirillo's first professional club was Sport Club Americano. His good performances granted him moves to Internacional and then Peñarol. In 1941 he transferred to Flamengo with the hard task to replace Leonidas da Silva—who had been 1940 Rio State Championship's top scorer with 30 goals.

Pirillo became an idol when by the end of 1941 Rio State Championship he had been its top scorer with 39 goals—an unbeaten record until today. He was also a very important player at 1942-1943-1944 Rio State Championships titles. Pirillo is the 4th high scorer in Flamengo's history with 204 goals.

In 1948 he signed with Botafogo and once again he had a difficult assignment: to replace Heleno de Freitas. In the same year he won the Rio State Championship with Botafogo, becoming an idol in another major club.

After retiring as a player, Pirillo began a successful career as a coach. As Brazil's coach, he was the first one to draft Pelé in 1957, for the Roca Cup, a match against Argentina, at Maracanã Stadium.

== Honours ==
- Rio State Championship

1942, 1943, 1944 - Flamengo
1948 - Botafogo
