= Grêmio Esportivo Renner =

Brazilian football club

Renner
- Full name: Grêmio Esportivo Renner
- Nickname(s): Time dos Industriários
- Founded: July 27, 1931
- Dissolved: 1959
- Ground: Tiradentes
- Capacity: 6,000
- League: Campeonato Citadino de Porto Alegre
- 1958: 3rd
Home colours	Away colours

Grêmio Esportivo Renner, commonly known as Renner, was a Brazilian football club from Porto Alegre. It was founded on July 27, 1931 and enjoyed relative success throughout its short history, winning the 1954 Campeonato Gaúcho.

== History ==
Grêmio Esportivo Renner were founded on July 27, 1931. Renner was founded by employees of clothing manufacturer A. J. Renner & Cia. Initially, the intention was just for employee recreation, but the company owner saw potential in the team and started to support it. Their fans were, for the most part, Renner's factor workers or from the neighborhood of Navegantes, where most employees lived and the factory was located. The club, with the help of Ênio Andrade, won the Campeonato Gaúcho in 1954, thus being the first club, besides Grêmio and Internacional, to win the state championship since 1939, and would remain the only one to do so until Juventude in 1998, 44 years later. Renner folded five years later, as the operation of the club was unprofitable for the company and left a financial hole after every season.

== Honours ==
=== State ===
- Campeonato Gaúcho
  - Winners (1): 1954

=== City ===
- Campeonato Citadino de Porto Alegre
  - Winners (2): 1938, 1954
- Torneio Extra de Porto Alegre
  - Winners (1): 1947
- Torneio Triangular de Porto Alegre
  - Winners (1): 1950
- Torneio da Associação dos Cronistas Esportivos de Porto Alegre
  - Winners (1): 1956

== Stadium ==
Renner played their home games at the Tiradentes stadium. The stadium had a maximum capacity of 6,000 people.
