= José Villalba =

Argentine footballer

José Villalba, also known as Vilalba (1920 in Santo Tomé, Argentina – 1987 in Porto Alegre, Rio Grande do Sul) was an Argentine football (soccer) striker.

Little is known about his life. As a player, Villalba played for many clubs of Brazil. With Sport Club Internacional Villalba had a successful career and he is remembered as one of the best strikers of Internacional history. In Gre-Nal derby, Villalba is the second top scorer for Internacional. He scored 20 goals on the history of the derby.

== Clubs ==
- Internacional: 1941 - 1944
- Palmeiras: 1944 - 1945
- Atlético Mineiro: 1945 - 1946
- Internacional: 1946 - 1949
- Rio Grande: 1950 - 1954

== Honours ==
- Campeonato Gaúcho: 1941, 1942, 1943, 1947 and 1948
