= 1978 Campeonato Gaúcho =

Campeonato Gaúcho
- Season: 1978
- Champions: Internacional
- Relegated: Associação Santa Cruz; Santo Ângelo
- Taça de Ouro: Grêmio; Internacional; São Paulo; Novo Hamburgo; Juventude; Caxias
- Matches: 246
- Goals: 486 (1.98 per match)
- Top goalscorer: Jair (Internacional); Valdomiro (Internacional) – 15 goals
- Biggest home win: Gaúcho 9–1 Santo Ângelo (September 3, 1978)
- Biggest away win: Farroupilha 0–4 Grêmio (August 9, 1978)
- Highest scoring: Gaúcho 9–1 Santo Ângelo (September 3, 1978)

The 58th season of the Campeonato Gaúcho kicked off on July 30, 1978, and ended on December 17, 1978. Twenty teams participated. Internacional won their 25th title. Associação Santa Cruz and Santo Ângelo were relegated.

== Participating teams ==
Club	Stadium	Home location	Previous season
14 de Julho	Vermelhão da Serra	Passo Fundo	15th
Associação Santa Cruz	Plátanos	Santa Cruz do Sul	6th
Atlético de Carazinho	Paulo Coutinho	Carazinho	14th
Brasil	Bento Freitas	Pelotas	8th
Cruzeiro	Estrelão	Porto Alegre	10th
Caxias	Centenário	Caxias do Sul	4th
Esportivo	Montanha	Bento Gonçalves	5th
Estrela	Walter Jobim	Estrela	2nd (Second level)
Farroupilha	Nicolau Fico	Pelotas	4th (Second level)
Gaúcho	Wolmar Salton	Passo Fundo	1st (Second level)
Grêmio	Pedra Moura	Bagé	12th
Grêmio	Olímpico	Porto Alegre	1st
Guarany	Estrela D'Alva	Bagé	16th
Internacional	Beira-Rio	Porto Alegre	2nd
Internacional	Presidente Vargas	Santa Maria	11th
Juventude	Alfredo Jaconi	Caxias do Sul	3rd
Novo Hamburgo	Santa Rosa	Novo Hamburgo	9th
Pelotas	Boca do Lobo	Pelotas	7th
São Borja	Vicente Goulart	São Borja	17th
São Paulo	Aldo Dapuzzo	Rio Grande	3rd (Second level)
Santo Ângelo	Zona Norte	Santo Ângelo	19th

== System ==
The championship would have four stages.:

- First phase: The twenty clubs would be divided into four groups of five teams. The teams of the group A would play against the teams from group B twice, and the teams of group C would play twice against the teams of Group D. The top teams of each group would then play the semifinals in a two-legged knockout round. the winners of the semifinals qualified to the Final phase, and later, the Semifinals winners would play the Finals, the winner of which earned an extra point to the Final phase.
- Second phase: On the same groups as the previous phase, the teams of the group A would play against the teams from group C twice, and the teams of group B would play twice against the teams of Group D. The top teams of each group would then play the semifinals in a two-legged knockout round. the winners of the semifinals qualified to the Final phase, and later, the Semifinals winners would play the Finals, the winner of which earned an extra point to the Final phase.
- Torneio da Morte: The bottom-placed team counting First and second stages would be relegated; Two teams among the eliminated would play against each other three times to define the other team that would be relegated into the Second level.
- Final phase (Copa 60 Anos FGF): The six remaining teams (four qualified through the championship and two through the Taça Presidente Rubens Freire Hoffmeister) played each other in a double round-robin system; the team with the most points won the title.

== Taça Presidente Rubens Freire Hoffmeister ==
The Taça Presidente Rubens Freire Hoffmeister would be played in the first semester by the 15 teams that were slated to play in the championship aside of those that participated in the Campeonato Brasileiro at the time.

In the first stage, The 15 teams would be divided into four groups. All qualified to the second phase, with the two best teams in each group qualifying to Group E and the others qualifying to Group F. In the second phase, each team played twice against the teams of their own group. The four best teams of Group E and the two best teams of Group F qualified to the Final phase, which would also be disputed in a double round-robin format, with the two bet teams qualifying to the Final phase of the Campeonato Gaúcho.

=== First phase ===
==== Group A ====
Pos	Team	Pld	W	D	L	GF	GA	GD	Pts	Qualification or relegation
1	Novo Hamburgo	4	2	2	0	4	1	+3	6	Group E
2	Atlético de Carazinho	4	1	3	0	4	1	+3	5	Group E
3	São Borja	4	0	1	3	2	8	−6	1	Group F

Updated to match(es) played on March 22, 1978. Source: RSSSF.com
Rules for classification: 1) points; 2) wins; 3) goal difference; 4) number of goals scored.

==== Group B ====
Pos	Team	Pld	W	D	L	GF	GA	GD	Pts	Qualification or relegation
1	Esportivo	6	3	2	1	9	7	+2	8	Group E
2	Estrela	6	3	1	2	11	9	+2	7	Group E
3	Guarany de Bagé	6	1	3	2	6	8	−2	5	Group F
4	14 de Julho	6	1	2	3	7	9	−2	4	Group F

Updated to match(es) played on March 22, 1978. Source: RSSSF.com
Rules for classification: 1) points; 2) wins; 3) goal difference; 4) number of goals scored.

==== Group C ====
Pos	Team	Pld	W	D	L	GF	GA	GD	Pts	Qualification or relegation
1	Associação Santa Cruz	6	3	2	1	12	6	+6	8	Group E
2	Pelotas	6	2	3	1	8	9	−1	7	Group E
3	Internacional de Santa Maria	6	2	1	3	9	7	+2	5	Group F
4	Santo Ângelo	6	1	2	3	8	15	−7	4	Group F

Updated to match(es) played on March 22, 1978. Source: RSSSF.com
Rules for classification: 1) points; 2) wins; 3) goal difference; 4) number of goals scored.

==== Group D ====
Pos	Team	Pld	W	D	L	GF	GA	GD	Pts	Qualification or relegation
1	São Paulo	6	3	2	1	11	7	+4	8	Group E
2	Cruzeiro	6	3	1	2	5	5	0	7	Group E
3	Gaúcho	6	3	0	3	7	6	+1	6	Group F
4	Grêmio Bagé	6	1	1	4	4	9	−5	3	Group F

Updated to match(es) played on March 22, 1978. Source: RSSSF.com
Rules for classification: 1) points; 2) wins; 3) goal difference; 4) number of goals scored.

=== Second phase ===
==== Group E ====
Pos	Team	Pld	W	D	L	GF	GA	GD	Pts	Qualification or relegation
1	Novo Hamburgo	14	7	4	3	18	12	+6	18	Final phase
2	Cruzeiro	14	6	4	4	18	13	+5	16	Final phase
3	Atlético de Carazinho	14	6	4	4	15	11	+4	16	Withdrew
4	Pelotas	14	5	6	3	17	12	+5	16	Final phase
5	Esportivo	14	5	5	4	11	9	+2	15	Final phase
6	Estrela	14	3	6	5	10	14	−4	12	
7	Associação Santa Cruz	14	3	5	6	11	21	−10	11	
8	São Paulo	14	1	6	7	7	15	−8	8	

Updated to match(es) played on May 13, 1978. Source: RSSSF.com
Rules for classification: 1) points; 2) wins; 3) goal difference; 4) number of goals scored.

==== Group F ====
Pos	Team	Pld	W	D	L	GF	GA	GD	Pts	Qualification or relegation
1	São Borja	12	6	3	3	16	12	+4	15	Final phase
2	Grêmio Bagé	12	4	7	1	8	4	+4	15	Final phase
3	Santo Ângelo	12	4	6	2	11	10	+1	14	
4	14 de Julho	12	3	7	2	11	10	+1	13	
5	Gaúcho	12	3	4	5	14	15	−1	10	
6	Guarany de Bagé	12	2	6	4	4	7	−3	10	
7	Internacional de Santa Maria	12	1	5	6	9	15	−6	7	

Updated to match(es) played on May 13, 1978. Source: RSSSF.com
Rules for classification: 1) points; 2) wins; 3) goal difference; 4) number of goals scored.

=== Final phase ===
Pos	Team	Pld	W	D	L	GF	GA	GD	Pts	Qualification or relegation
1	Esportivo	10	5	4	1	12	5	+7	14	Playoffs;Qualified to Copa 60 Anos FGF
2	Novo Hamburgo	10	5	4	1	13	7	+6	14	Playoffs;Qualified to Copa 60 Anos FGF
3	Pelotas	10	4	3	3	10	7	+3	11	
4	São Borja	10	2	5	3	7	11	−4	9	
5	Cruzeiro	10	3	2	5	9	12	−3	8	
6	Grêmio Bagé	10	1	2	7	4	13	−9	4	

Updated to match(es) played on July 22, 1978. Source: RSSSF.com
Rules for classification: 1) points; 2) wins; 3) goal difference; 4) number of goals scored.

==== Playoffs ====
30 July 1978

Esportivo	3–1	Novo Hamburgo
Valdeci 55'; Adílson 67'; Espinosa 85'	Report	Loivo 23'

Montanha, Bento Gonçalves
Referee: Luiz Zeterman Torres

== Championship ==
=== First phase ===
==== Group A ====
Pos	Team	Pld	W	D	L	GF	GA	GD	Pts	Qualification or relegation
1	Grêmio	10	8	1	1	24	5	+19	17	Qualified
2	Internacional de Santa Maria	10	3	4	3	6	9	−3	10	
3	São Paulo	10	2	5	3	7	11	−4	9	
4	Guarany de Bagé	10	1	6	3	4	10	−6	8	
5	Novo Hamburgo	10	2	3	5	6	11	−5	7	

Updated to match(es) played on September 10, 1978. Source: RSSSF.com
Rules for classification: 1) points; 2) wins; 3) goal difference; 4) number of goals scored.

==== Group B ====
Pos	Team	Pld	W	D	L	GF	GA	GD	Pts	Qualification or relegation
1	Internacional	10	8	1	1	28	7	+21	17	Qualified
2	Estrela	10	4	3	3	8	8	0	11	
3	Grêmio Bagé	10	2	6	2	3	7	−4	10	
4	Farroupilha	10	0	6	4	2	12	−10	6	
5	Associação Santa Cruz	10	1	3	6	5	13	−8	5	

Updated to match(es) played on September 10, 1978. Source: RSSSF.com
Rules for classification: 1) points; 2) wins; 3) goal difference; 4) number of goals scored.

==== Group C ====
Pos	Team	Pld	W	D	L	GF	GA	GD	Pts	Qualification or relegation
1	Juventude	10	5	4	1	16	7	+9	14	Qualified
2	Gaúcho	10	5	2	3	20	9	+11	12	
3	Brasil de Pelotas	10	4	4	2	13	6	+7	12	
4	Cruzeiro	10	3	5	2	11	6	+5	11	
5	São Borja	10	3	4	3	5	8	−3	10	

Updated to match(es) played on September 10, 1978. Source: RSSSF.com
Rules for classification: 1) points; 2) wins; 3) goal difference; 4) number of goals scored.

==== Group D ====
Pos	Team	Pld	W	D	L	GF	GA	GD	Pts	Qualification or relegation
1	Esportivo	10	4	5	1	8	4	+4	13	Qualified
2	Caxias	10	3	6	1	12	8	+4	12	
3	Pelotas	10	3	3	4	9	10	−1	9	
4	14 de Julho	10	1	4	5	5	12	−7	6	
5	Santo Ângelo	10	0	1	9	2	31	−29	1	

Updated to match(es) played on September 10, 1978. Source: RSSSF.com
Rules for classification: 1) points; 2) wins; 3) goal difference; 4) number of goals scored.

==== Semifinals ====
Team 1	Agg.	Team 2	1st leg	2nd leg
Juventude	1–1	Esportivo	0–1	1–0
Internacional	3–2	Grêmio	2–2	1–0

==== Finals ====
Team 1	Agg.	Team 2	1st leg	2nd leg
Internacional	3–0	Esportivo	2–0	1–0

=== Second phase ===
==== Group A ====
Pos	Team	Pld	W	D	L	GF	GA	GD	Pts	Qualification or relegation
1	Grêmio	10	6	3	1	25	5	+20	15	Qualified
2	Internacional de Santa Maria	10	4	4	2	10	7	+3	12	
3	Guarany de Bagé	10	3	3	4	8	11	−3	9	
4	São Paulo	10	3	1	6	5	12	−7	7	
5	Novo Hamburgo	10	1	5	4	5	12	−7	7	

Updated to match(es) played on October 25, 1978. Source: RSSSF.com
Rules for classification: 1) points; 2) wins; 3) goal difference; 4) number of goals scored.

==== Group B ====
Pos	Team	Pld	W	D	L	GF	GA	GD	Pts	Qualification or relegation
1	Internacional	10	8	1	1	22	5	+17	17	Qualified
2	Estrela	10	5	3	2	12	4	+8	13	
3	Farroupilha	10	4	3	3	15	9	+6	11	
4	Associação Santa Cruz	10	1	5	4	6	9	−3	7	
5	Grêmio Bagé	10	2	1	7	10	15	−5	5	

Updated to match(es) played on October 25, 1978. Source: RSSSF.com
Rules for classification: 1) points; 2) wins; 3) goal difference; 4) number of goals scored.

==== Group C ====
Pos	Team	Pld	W	D	L	GF	GA	GD	Pts	Qualification or relegation
1	Juventude	10	5	3	2	13	9	+4	13	Qualified
2	Cruzeiro	10	5	0	5	13	16	−3	10	
3	Gaúcho	10	3	4	3	7	6	+1	10	
4	São Borja	10	2	5	3	8	14	−6	9	
5	Brasil de Pelotas	10	2	4	4	6	8	−2	8	

Updated to match(es) played on October 25, 1978. Source: RSSSF.com
Rules for classification: 1) points; 2) wins; 3) goal difference; 4) number of goals scored.

==== Group D ====
Pos	Team	Pld	W	D	L	GF	GA	GD	Pts	Qualification or relegation
1	Caxias	10	7	2	1	12	2	+10	16	Qualified
2	Pelotas	10	4	4	2	10	9	+1	12	
3	14 de Julho	10	3	5	2	8	8	0	11	
4	Esportivo	10	1	2	7	5	21	−16	4	
5	Santo Ângelo	10	2	0	8	7	25	−18	4	

Updated to match(es) played on October 25, 1978. Source: RSSSF.com
Rules for classification: 1) points; 2) wins; 3) goal difference; 4) number of goals scored.

==== Semifinals ====
Team 1	Agg.	Team 2	1st leg	2nd leg
Caxias	2–5	Grêmio	2–0	0–5
Internacional	5–2	Juventude	3–0	2–2

==== Finals ====
Team 1	Agg.	Team 2	1st leg	2nd leg
Grêmio	2–3	Internacional	1–1	1–2

=== Final standings ===
Pos	Team	Pld	W	D	L	GF	GA	GD	Pts	Qualification or relegation
1	Internacional	20	16	2	2	50	12	+38	34	Qualified through Championship
2	Grêmio	20	14	4	2	49	10	+39	32	Qualified through Championship
3	Caxias	20	10	8	2	24	10	+14	28	Qualified through Championship
4	Juventude	20	10	7	3	29	16	+13	27	Qualified through Championship
5	Estrela	20	9	6	5	20	12	+8	24	
6	Gaúcho	20	8	6	6	27	15	+12	22	
7	Internacional de Santa Maria	20	7	8	5	16	16	0	22	
8	Cruzeiro	20	8	5	7	24	22	+2	21	Torneio da Morte
9	Pelotas	20	7	7	6	19	19	0	21	
10	Brasil de Pelotas	20	6	8	6	19	14	+5	20	
11	São Borja	20	5	9	6	13	22	−9	19	
12	Esportivo	20	5	7	8	13	25	−12	17	Qualified through Taça Rubens Hoffmeister
13	Farroupilha	20	4	9	7	17	21	−4	17	
14	14 de Julho	20	4	9	7	13	20	−7	17	
15	Guarany de Bagé	20	4	9	7	12	21	−9	17	
16	São Paulo	20	5	6	9	12	23	−11	16	
17	Grêmio Bagé	20	4	7	9	13	22	−9	15	
18	Novo Hamburgo	20	3	8	9	11	23	−12	14	Qualified through Taça Rubens Hoffmeister
19	Associação Santa Cruz	20	2	8	10	11	22	−11	12	Torneio da Morte
20	Santo Ângelo	20	2	1	17	9	56	−47	5	Relegated

Updated to match(es) played on October 25, 1978. Source: RSSSF.com
Rules for classification: 1) points; 2) wins; 3) goal difference; 4) number of goals scored.

==== Torneio da Morte ====
Team 1	Series	Team 2	Game 1	Game 2	Game 3
Associação Santa Cruz	0–1	Cruzeiro	0–0	0–0	0-1

5 November 1978

Associação Santa Cruz	0–0	Cruzeiro

Plátanos, Santa Cruz do Sul
Referee: Sílvio Rodrigues
11 November 1978

Cruzeiro	0–0	Associação Santa Cruz

Estrelão, Porto Alegre
Referee: Órion Sátter de Melo
19 November 1978

Associação Santa Cruz	0–1 (a.e.t.)	Cruzeiro
		Sílvio 104'

Plátanos, Santa Cruz do Sul
Referee: Carlos Sérgio Rosa Martins

=== Copa 60 Anos FGF ===
Pos	Team	Pld	W	D	L	GF	GA	GD	Pts	Qualification or relegation
1	Grêmio	10	6	4	0	19	5	+14	16	Playoffs;1979 Taça de Ouro
2	Internacional	10	4	6	0	15	5	+10	16	Playoffs;1979 Taça de Ouro
3	Caxias	10	2	7	1	5	5	0	11	1979 Taça de Ouro
4	Esportivo	10	2	4	4	7	16	−9	8	
5	Juventude	10	1	4	5	5	11	−6	6	1979 Taça de Ouro
6	Novo Hamburgo	10	0	5	5	3	12	−9	5	1979 Taça de Ouro

Updated to match(es) played on December 13, 1978. Source: RSSSF.com
Rules for classification: 1) points; 2) wins; 3) goal difference; 4) number of goals scored.

==== Playoffs ====
17 December 1978
Finals

Grêmio	1 – 2	Internacional
Tarciso 79'		Valdomiro 50', 86'

Olímpico, Porto Alegre
Attendance: 53,057
Referee: José Roberto Wright
