= Wagner Fernandes =

Brazilian footballer

Personal information
- Full name: Wagner Fernandes da Silva
- Date of birth: 8 April 1967 (age 59)
- Place of birth: Mirandópolis, Brazil
- Height: 1.87 m (6 ft 2 in)
- Position: Centre-back

Senior career*
Years	Team	Apps	(Gls)
1989	Mixto		
1990–1997	Grêmio	100	(3)
1993	→ São José-RS (loan)		
1994	→ Brasil de Farroupilha (loan)		
1996	→ Rio Branco-SP (loan)		
1998–1999	Brasil de Pelotas		
- * Club domestic league appearances and goals as of 27 January 2024

Wagner Fernandes (born 8 April 1967), is a Brazilian former professional footballer who played as a centre-back.

== Career ==
Wagner emerged as one of the highlights of Mixto, state champion in 1989. He played for Grêmio from 1990 to 1997, making 100 appearances and scoring 3 goals, one of which was in the final of the 1997 Campeonato Gaúcho. After retiring he became a coach in youth categories.

== Honours ==
Mixto

- Campeonato Mato-Grossense: 1989

Grêmio

- Copa Libertadores: 1995
- Campeonato Brasileiro: 1996
- Copa do Brasil: 1997
- Campeonato Gaúcho: 1995
