= 1992 Campeonato Gaúcho =

Campeonato Gaúcho
- Season: 1992
- Champions: Internacional
- Copa do Brasil: Grêmio; Internacional
- Matches played: 257
- Goals scored: 533 (2.07 per match)
- Top goalscorer: Gílson (Brasil de Pelotas) – 13 goals
- Biggest home win: Grêmio 6-1 Ta-Guá (July 26, 1992); Internacional 5-0 São Paulo (August 23, 1992)
- Biggest away win: Juventude 0-3 Glória (September 20, 1992); Novo Hamburgo 0-3 Pelotas (September 27, 1992); Passo Fundo 1-4 Caxias (October 31, 1992)
- Highest scoring: Grêmio 6-1 Ta-Guá (July 26, 1992); Novo Hamburgo 4-3 São Paulo (October 7, 1992)

The 72nd season of the Campeonato Gaúcho kicked off on July 26, 1992, and ended on December 23, 1992. Twenty-two teams participated. Holders Internacional beat Grêmio in the finals and won their 31st title. No teams were relegated.

== Participating teams ==
Club	Stadium	Home location	Previous season
Aimoré	Cristo-Rei	São Leopoldo	20th
Brasil	Bento Freitas	Pelotas	6th
Caxias	Centenário	Caxias do Sul	13th
Dínamo	Carlos Denardin	Santa Rosa	11th
Esportivo	Montanha	Bento Gonçalves	12th
Glória	Altos da Glória	Vacaria	7th
Grêmio	Olímpico	Porto Alegre	2nd
Grêmio	Honório Nunes	Santana do Livramento	2nd (Second level)
Guarani	Edmundo Feix	Venâncio Aires	5th
Guarany	Taba Índia	Cruz Alta	18th
Internacional	Beira-Rio	Porto Alegre	1st
Internacional	Presidente Vargas	Santa Maria	1st (Second level)
Juventude	Alfredo Jaconi	Caxias do Sul	3rd
Lajeadense	Florestal	Lajeado	4th
Novo Hamburgo	Santa Rosa	Novo Hamburgo	14th
Passo Fundo	Vermelhão da Serra	Passo Fundo	15th
Pelotas	Boca do Lobo	Pelotas	9th
São Luiz	19 de Outubro	Ijuí	8th
São Paulo	Aldo Dapuzzo	Rio Grande	19th
Santa Cruz	Plátanos	Santa Cruz do Sul	17th
Ta-Guá	Plácido Scussel	Getúlio Vargas	16th
Ypiranga	Colosso da Lagoa	Erechim	10th

== System ==
The championship would have three stages:

- First phase: The twenty-two teams were divided into two groups of eleven, and played each other in a single round-robin system. The four best teams in each group qualified to the Second phase.
- Second phase: The eight remaining teams were divided into two groups of four, in which each team played the teams of its own group in a double round-robin system. The best teams in each group qualified to the Finals.
- Finals: The group winners played each other in two matches to define the champions.

== Championship ==
=== First phase ===
==== Group 1 ====
Pos	Team	Pld	W	D	L	GF	GA	GD	Pts	Qualification or relegation
1	Pelotas	21	14	3	4	29	16	+13	31	Qualified
2	Grêmio	21	10	9	2	33	13	+20	29	Qualified
3	Brasil de Pelotas	21	9	8	4	23	17	+6	26	Qualified
4	Internacional de Santa Maria	21	9	7	5	27	20	+7	25	Qualified
5	São Paulo	21	10	4	7	21	27	−6	24	
6	Novo Hamburgo	21	8	7	6	28	25	+3	23	
7	Santa Cruz	21	8	7	6	25	24	+1	23	
8	Guarani de Venâncio Aires	21	5	8	8	23	22	+1	18	
9	Grêmio Santanense	21	6	5	10	20	27	−7	17	
10	Aimoré	21	5	6	10	17	19	−2	16	
11	Lajeadense	21	3	8	10	12	26	−14	14	

Updated to match(es) played on November 14, 1992. Source: RSSSF.com
Rules for classification: 1) points; 2) wins; 3) goal difference; 4) number of goals scored.

==== Group 2 ====
Pos	Team	Pld	W	D	L	GF	GA	GD	Pts	Qualification or relegation
1	Internacional	21	13	4	4	39	13	+26	30	Qualified
2	Esportivo	21	10	6	5	24	16	+8	26	Qualified
3	Glória	21	10	5	6	22	14	+8	25	Qualified
4	Caxias	21	9	7	5	31	24	+7	25	Qualified
5	São Luiz	21	9	6	6	23	17	+6	24	
6	Dínamo	21	4	9	8	13	19	−6	17	
7	Juventude	21	4	9	8	17	27	−10	17	
8	Ypiranga de Erechim	21	6	4	11	15	27	−12	16	
9	Guarany de Cruz Alta	21	4	8	9	20	32	−12	16	
10	Ta-Guá	21	4	4	13	13	39	−26	12	
11	Passo Fundo	21	2	4	15	13	32	−19	8	

Updated to match(es) played on November 14, 1992. Source: RSSSF.com
Rules for classification: 1) points; 2) wins; 3) goal difference; 4) number of goals scored.

=== Second phase ===
==== Group 1 ====
Pos	Team	Pld	W	D	L	GF	GA	GD	Pts	Qualification or relegation
1	Grêmio	6	3	2	1	7	3	+4	8	Qualified
2	Pelotas	6	3	1	2	4	4	0	7	
3	Brasil de Pelotas	6	2	3	1	4	1	+3	7	
4	Internacional de Santa Maria	6	0	2	4	1	8	−7	2	

Updated to match(es) played on December 13, 1992. Source: RSSSF.com
Rules for classification: 1) points; 2) wins; 3) goal difference; 4) number of goals scored.

==== Group 2 ====
Pos	Team	Pld	W	D	L	GF	GA	GD	Pts	Qualification or relegation
1	Internacional	6	2	4	0	8	5	+3	8	Qualified
2	Caxias	6	2	3	1	6	5	+1	7	
3	Esportivo	6	0	5	1	3	4	−1	5	
4	Glória	6	1	2	3	4	7	−3	4	

Updated to match(es) played on December 13, 1992. Source: RSSSF.com
Rules for classification: 1) points; 2) wins; 3) goal difference; 4) number of goals scored.

=== Finals ===
Team 1	Agg.	Team 2	1st leg	2nd leg
Grêmio	1–3	Internacional	1–3	0–0

20 December 1992
Finals

Grêmio	1 – 3	Internacional
Alcindo 41'	Report	Marquinhos 3'; Nando 48', 88'

Olímpico, Porto Alegre
Attendance: 19,239
Referee: Silvio Luis de Oliveira
23 December 1992
Finals

Internacional	0 – 0	Grêmio
	Report

Beira-Rio, Porto Alegre
Attendance: 17,490
Referee: Renato Marsiglia
