= Edgar Booth =

German-born Brazilian footballer

Personal information
- Full name: Edgar Booth
- Date of birth: 13 April 1888
- Place of birth: Hamburg, Germany
- Date of death: c. 1945
- Place of death: Brazil
- Height: 1.76 m (5 ft 9 in)
- Position: Attacking midfielder

Youth career
- Years: Team
- 1907–1914: Grêmio FBPA

Edgar Booth (13 April 1888 – c. 1945) was a German and naturalized Brazilian footballer.

Booth played for Grêmio FBPA, and was famously involved in the first Porto Alegre derby match between Grêmio and SC Internacional (a derby commonly known as Gre–Nal) on July 18, 1909. He kicked off the match and at 10 minutes, scored the first goal of the game and in the history of the rivalry. Booth would score four more goals for a total of five goals in the match, which ended 10-0 for Grêmio, the biggest margin of victory for either side to date.

The referee of the match was Waldemar Bromberg, and line referees João de Castro e Silva and H. Sommer, and goal referees Theobaldo Foernges Bugs and Theodoro. The goal referees sat on a stool beside the goalkeepers, indicating whether the ball entered the goal or not, because at the time there were no nets.

The players wore fraternity shirts divided vertically in half blue and half white, with black shorts. Since the wearing of the International vertically striped shirt in red and white, with white shorts. The audience was estimated at two thousand people.

== 1909 Grêmio FBPA Squad ==
Kallfelz; Deppermann e Becker; Karls, Black e Mostardeiro; Brochado, Grünewald, Moreira, Booth e Schröder.

Location: Baixada Stadium, Porto Alegre / RS Referee: Waldemar Bromberg Assistant referees: João de Castro e Silva e H. Sommer (linesmen), Theobaldo Foernges e Theodoro Bugs (Judges goal)
