= Estádio dos Eucaliptos =

Football stadium in Porto Alegre, Brazil

Coordinates: 30°3′42″S 51°13′38″W

Estádio Ildo Meneghetti
- Estádio dos Eucaliptos
- Interactive map of Estádio Ildo Meneghetti
- Full name: Estádio Ildo Meneghetti
- Location: Porto Alegre, Brazil
- Owner: Sport Club Internacional
- Capacity: 20,000

Construction
- Built: 1931
- Opened: 15 March 1931
- Closed: 1969
- Demolished: 2012

Tenants
- Sport Club Americano; Sport Club Internacional

The Estádio Ildo Meneghetti, familiarly known as Estádio dos Eucaliptos, was a football stadium located in the neighborhood of Menino Deus, in Porto Alegre, Rio Grande do Sul, Brazil. The stadium was built in 1931 had a maximum seating capacity of 20,000 people.

Estádio dos Eucaliptos was owned by Sport Club Internacional. The stadium was nicknamed after Chácara dos Eucaliptos (meaning Eucalyptus' Ranch), the site of the stadium. Its formal name honors Ildo Meneghetti, who was a president of Internacional and an engineer.

== History ==
In 1931, Estádio dos Eucaliptos were completed. The then-maximum seating capacity was of 10,000 people. The inaugural match was played on 15 March 15 when Internacional beat Grêmio 3-0. The first goal of the stadium was made by Internacional's Javel. The stadium's attendance record currently stands at 22,000, set in the inaugural match.

The stadium was reformed by the Brazilian Sports Confederation (CBD) for the 1950 FIFA World Cup, and hosted two matches. On 29 June 1950, the Yugoslavia national team beat the Mexico national team 4-1. On 2 July, Switzerland beat Mexico 2-1.

In March 1969, the last match at Estádio dos Eucaliptos was played. Internacional beat Rio Grande 4-1.

In 1969, after the Estádio Beira-Rio was inaugurated, the Estádio dos Eucaliptos was deactivated.
