= 1991 Campeonato Gaúcho =

Campeonato Gaúcho
- Season: 1991
- Champions: Internacional
- Copa do Brasil: Grêmio; Internacional
- Matches played: 217
- Goals scored: 449 (2.07 per match)
- Top goalscorer: Gélson (Lajeadense) – 15 goals
- Biggest home win: Internacional 6-1 Passo Fundo (August 17, 1991); Esportivo 5-0 Ta-Guá (September 18, 1991); Ypiranga 5-0 São Paulo (October 27, 1991)
- Biggest away win: Guarani-VA 0-4 Brasil de Pelotas (November 17, 1991)
- Highest scoring: Internacional 6-1 Passo Fundo (August 17, 1991); Passo Fundo 5-2 Caxias (August 28, 1991)

The 71st season of the Campeonato Gaúcho kicked off on August 11, 1991 and ended in December 15, 1991. Twenty teams participated. Internacional beat holders Grêmio in the finals and won their 30th title. No teams were relegated.

== Participating teams ==
Club	Stadium	Home location	Previous season
Aimoré	Cristo-Rei	São Leopoldo	14th
Brasil	Bento Freitas	Pelotas	14th (Second level)
Caxias	Centenário	Caxias do Sul	2nd
Dínamo	Carlos Denardin	Santa Rosa	9th (Second level)
Esportivo	Montanha	Bento Gonçalves	9th
Glória	Altos da Glória	Vacaria	10th
Grêmio	Olímpico	Porto Alegre	1st
Guarani	Edmundo Feix	Venâncio Aires	2nd (Second level)
Guarany	Taba Índia	Cruz Alta	7th
Internacional	Beira-Rio	Porto Alegre	3rd
Juventude	Alfredo Jaconi	Caxias do Sul	4th
Lajeadense	Florestal	Lajeado	11th
Novo Hamburgo	Santa Rosa	Novo Hamburgo	13th
Passo Fundo	Vermelhão da Serra	Passo Fundo	12th
Pelotas	Boca do Lobo	Pelotas	6th
São Luiz	19 de Outubro	Ijuí	1st (Second level)
São Paulo	Aldo Dapuzzo	Rio Grande	11th (Second level)
Santa Cruz	Plátanos	Santa Cruz do Sul	8th
Ta-Guá	Plácido Scussel	Getúlio Vargas	24th (Second level)
Ypiranga	Colosso da Lagoa	Erechim	5th

== System ==
The championship would have three stages:

- First phase: The twenty teams were divided into two groups of ten, and played each other in a single round-robin system. The two best teams in each group and the four best teams with the best record qualified to the Second phase.
- Second phase: The eight remaining teams were divided into two groups of four, in which each team played the teams of its own group in a double round-robin system. The best teams in each group qualified to the Finals.
- Finals: The group winners played each other in three matches to define the champions.

== Championship ==
=== First phase ===
==== Group 1 ====
Pos	Team	Pld	W	D	L	GF	GA	GD	Pts	Qualification or relegation
1	Internacional	19	11	6	2	36	14	+22	28	Qualified
2	São Luiz	19	6	10	3	19	16	+3	22	Qualified
3	Pelotas	19	6	9	4	25	16	+9	21	
4	Ypiranga de Erechim	19	6	9	4	21	16	+5	21	
5	Dínamo	19	6	8	5	19	14	+5	20	
6	Esportivo	19	6	8	5	17	16	+1	20	
7	Caxias	19	4	8	7	17	24	−7	16	
8	Santa Cruz	19	4	5	10	16	24	−8	13	
9	São Paulo	19	3	5	11	14	31	−17	11	
10	Aimoré	19	1	7	11	7	19	−12	9	

Updated to match(es) played on November 3, 1991. Source: RSSSF.com
Rules for classification: 1) points; 2) wins; 3) goal difference; 4) number of goals scored.

==== Group 2 ====
Pos	Team	Pld	W	D	L	GF	GA	GD	Pts	Qualification or relegation
1	Guarani de Venâncio Aires	19	9	10	0	20	9	+11	28	Qualified
2	Juventude	19	8	9	2	18	8	+10	25	Qualified
3	Lajeadense	19	10	4	5	25	22	+3	24	Qualified with the best season record
4	Grêmio	19	7	10	2	25	16	+9	24	Qualified with the best season record
5	Brasil de Pelotas	19	8	6	5	21	19	+2	22	Qualified with the best season record
6	Glória	19	6	9	4	20	17	+3	21	Qualified with the best season record
7	Novo Hamburgo	19	3	10	6	17	22	−5	16	
8	Passo Fundo	19	4	6	9	24	36	−12	14	
9	Ta-Guá	19	2	10	7	11	23	−12	14	
10	Guarany de Cruz Alta	19	3	5	11	16	26	−10	11	

Updated to match(es) played on November 3, 1991. Source: RSSSF.com
Rules for classification: 1) points; 2) wins; 3) goal difference; 4) number of goals scored.

=== Second phase ===
==== Group 1 ====
Pos	Team	Pld	W	D	L	GF	GA	GD	Pts	Qualification or relegation
1	Internacional	6	4	2	0	9	4	+5	10	Qualified
2	Juventude	6	4	1	1	8	4	+4	9	
3	Brasil de Pelotas	6	1	2	3	6	5	+1	4	
4	Guarani de Venâncio Aires	6	0	1	5	3	13	−10	1	

Updated to match(es) played on November 27, 1991. Source: RSSSF.com
Rules for classification: 1) points; 2) wins; 3) goal difference; 4) number of goals scored.

==== Group 2 ====
Pos	Team	Pld	W	D	L	GF	GA	GD	Pts	Qualification or relegation
1	Grêmio	6	4	1	1	13	5	+8	9	Qualified
2	Lajeadense	6	3	0	3	8	11	−3	6	
3	Glória	6	1	3	2	6	6	0	5	
4	São Luiz	6	1	2	3	5	10	−5	4	

Updated to match(es) played on November 27, 1991. Source: RSSSF.com
Rules for classification: 1) points; 2) wins; 3) goal difference; 4) number of goals scored.

=== Finals ===
Team 1	Series	Team 2	Game 1	Game 2	Game 3
Grêmio	3–3	Internacional	0–1	2–0	0–0

1 December 1991
Finals

Grêmio	0 – 1	Internacional
	Report	Alex 77'

Olímpico, Porto Alegre
Attendance: 34,851
Referee: José Mocellin
8 December 1991
Finals

Internacional	0 – 2	Grêmio
	Report	Lira 50', pen' Assis 90+2'

Beira-Rio, Porto Alegre
Attendance: 48,891
Referee: Renato Marsiglia
15 December 1991
Finals

Internacional	0 – 0	Grêmio
	Report

Beira-Rio, Porto Alegre
Attendance: 39,168
Referee: Carlos Sérgio Rosa Martins
