= Campeonato Citadino de Porto Alegre =

Football competition in Rio Grande do Sul, Brazil

- Organiser(s): Various
- Founded: 1910
- Abolished: 1972
- Region: Porto Alegre, Brazil
- Teams: 2–9
- Most championships: Grêmio FBPA (28 titles)

The Campeonato Citadino de Porto Alegre (English: Municipality of Porto Alegre Championship) was a football competition held among the clubs located in the city of Porto Alegre, Rio Grande do Sul, Brazil. It was established in 1910, making it older than the Campeonato Gaúcho.

== Champions ==
Following is the list of all Campeonato Citadino de Porto Alegre champions:

=== Liga Porto-Alegrense de Foot-Ball (LPAF) ===
Season	Champions	Runners-up
1910	Militar FBC (1)	Grêmio
1911	Grêmio (1)	Internacional
1912	Grêmio (2)	Internacional
1913	Internacional (1)	SC Colombo
1914	Internacional (2)	SC Colombo
1915	Internacional (3)	SC Colombo

After having played two matches, Grêmio left the league due to a problem with the International–Fuss Ball match. The referee designated by Grêmio would have been disrespected by athletes of the International. Grêmio then creates the AFPA. Common mistake: considering Grêmio champion of 1913.

=== Associação de Foot-Ball Porto Alegrense (AFPA) ===
Season	Champions	Runners-up
1914	Grêmio (3)	Fussball Club Porto Alegre
1915	Grêmio (4)	Fussball Club Porto Alegre

In 1916, AFPA and LPAF merge. FSRG appears.

=== Federação Sportiva Rio Grandense (FSRG) ===
Season	Champions	Runners-up
1916	Internacional (4)	Grêmio
1917	Internacional (5)	Cruzeiro
1918	Cruzeiro (1)	Internacional

In February 1917, the FSRG passed the "internship law", a ploy to prevent professionalism. Grêmio, which had just signed three Uruguayan players, felt that it was harmed and left the FSRG. The following year, Grêmio returned to FSRG.

At the end of 1918, another disagreement. Grêmio, Internacional, Fuss Ball, São José, Tabajara, Cruzeiro and Colombo leave the FSRG and found APAD. The new association joins the newly founded Rio Grandense Sports Federation (FRGD) which would give rise to the Federação Gaúcha de Futebol (FGF)

=== Associação Porto Alegrense de Desportos (APAD) ===
Season	Champions	Runners-up
1919	Grêmio (5)	Internacional
1920	Grêmio (6)	Internacional
1921	Cruzeiro (2)	Fussball Club Porto Alegre
1922	Internacional (6)	Cruzeiro
1923–I	Fussball Club Porto Alegre (1)	Internacional
1923–II	Grêmio (9)	Municipal
1924	Americano (1)	Cruzeiro
1925	Grêmio (10)	Internacional
1926	Grêmio (11)	Internacional
1927	Internacional (7)	Americano
1928	Americano (2)	Grêmio
1929	Cruzeiro (3)	São José

Internacional considers itself champion of the 1920 edition.

In August 1923, the leagues agreed. APAD incorporates APAF clubs. In the second semester, APAD organizes the continuation of the two tournaments, now renamed: the first called Torneio Rio Branco with the original APAD clubs and second called Torneio Ruy Barbosa with the clubs from the extinct APAF. A final match was planned between the two champions, but it didn't happen. APAD champion clubs will once again compete in the 1923 Campeonato Gaúcho edition.

=== Federação Porto Alegrense de Foot-Ball (FPAF) ===
Parallel to the dispute of the main leagues, other leagues were created by the city. The main competitor of FSRG and after APAD was FPAF.

Season	Champions	Runners-up
1918	SC Ruy Barbosa (1)	Americano
1919	SC Ruy Barbosa (2)	Municipal
1920	SC Ruy Barbosa (3)	Municipal

=== Associação Porto Alegrense de Foot-Ball (APAF) ===
At the end of 1920, three players from the extinct Mannschaft Frisch Auf transferred to Grêmio prevented by the application of the "Internship Law". Grêmio does not agree and resorts to FRGD. The FRGD gives a gain of cause to the league. The APAD leaders do not accept it and Grêmio withdraws from the association. With the seal of FRGD, APAF appears.

Season	Champions	Runners-up
1921	Grêmio (7)	SC Ruy Barbosa
1922	Grêmio (8)	Municipal

=== Associação Metropolitana Gaúcha de Esportes Athleticos (AMGEA) ===
At the beginning of 1929, another split in football in the city. Grêmio, International and Americano, among others leave APAD. With the adhesion of other clubs, they create the AMGEA. The new entity joins FRGD and the AMGEA champions will compete in the Campeonato Gaúcho. Remaining in APAD only: Cruzeiro, São José and Fuss Ball Porto Alegre.

Season	Champions	Runners-up
1929	Americano (3)	Grêmio
1930	Grêmio (12)	Cruzeiro
1931	Grêmio (13)	Internacional
1932–A	Grêmio (14)	Internacional
1933	Grêmio (15)	Internacional
1934	Internacional (8)	Cruzeiro
1935	Grêmio (16)	Internacional
1936	Internacional (9)	Grêmio
1937	Novo Hamburgo (1)	Americano
1937–E	Grêmio (17)	São José
1938	Renner (1)	Novo Hamburgo
1938–E	Grêmio (18)	Internacional
1939	Grêmio (19)	Internacional
1940–A	Internacional (10)	Grêmio

E – Especializado

==== Second level ====
Season	Champions	Runners-up
1932–B	GS Força e Luz (1)	São José
1940–B	Fussball Club Porto Alegre (1)	Renner

=== Federação Rio Grandense de Futebol (FRGF) ===
From 1941 onwards, the competitions were controlled by the Federação Rio Grandense de Futebol.

Season	Champions	Runners-up
1941	Internacional (11)	GS Força e Luz
1942–A	Internacional (12)	Cruzeiro
1943	Internacional (13)	Grêmio
1944	Internacional (14)	Grêmio
1945	Internacional (15)	Grêmio
1946	Grêmio (20)	Internacional
1947	Internacional (16)	Cruzeiro
1948	Internacional (17)	São José
1949	Grêmio (21)	Internacional
1950	Internacional (18)	Grêmio
1951	Internacional (19)	Grêmio
1952	Internacional (20)	Renner
1953	Internacional (21)	Renner
1954	Renner (2)	Internacional
1955	Internacional (22)	Grêmio
1956–H	Grêmio (22)	Renner
1957–H	Grêmio (23)	Internacional
1958–H	Grêmio (24)	Internacional
1959–H	Grêmio (25)	Aimoré
1960–H	Grêmio (26)	Internacional

H – Divisão de Honra

In 1961, the Campeonato Gaúcho Divisão Especial was created with teams from all over the state. Porto Alegre championship ends. Two more editions took place in 1964 and 1965 considering matches played by Campeonato Gaúcho.

Season	Champions	Runners-up
1964	Grêmio (27)	Internacional
1965	Grêmio (28)	São José

==== Second level ====
Season	Champions	Runners-up
1942–B	Renner (1)	GE Fiateci
1959–M	Veronese (1)	Esperança
1960–M	Flamengo (1)	Santa Cruz

M – Metropolitano

=== Taça Cidade de Porto Alegre (FGF) ===
Eleven years later, in 1972, Grêmio, Internacional, São José and Cruzeiro played the last tournament.

Season	Champions	Runners-up
1972	Internacional (23)	Grêmio
1972	Internacional (23)	São José

== Titles by team ==
Rank	Club	Winners	Winning years
1	Grêmio	28	1911, 1912, 1914 (AFPA), 1915 (AFPA), 1919 (APAD), 1920 (APAD), 1921 (APAF), 1922 (APAF), 1923-II, 1925, 1926, 1930, 1931, 1932, 1933, 1935, 1937-E, 1938-E, 1939, 1946, 1949, 1946, 1957, 1958, 1599, 1960, 1964, 1965
2	Internacional	23	1913, 1914 (LPAF), 1915 (LPAF), 1916, 1917, 1922 (APAD), 1927, 1934, 1936, 1940, 1941, 1942, 1943, 1944, 1945, 1947, 1948, 1950, 1951, 1952, 1953, 1955, 1972
3	Americano	3	1924, 1928, 1929 (AMGEA)
3	Cruzeiro	3	1918 (FSRG), 1921 (APAD), 1929 (APAD)
3	SC Ruy Barbosa	3	1918 (FPAF), 1919 (FPAF), 1920 (FPAF)
6	Renner	2	1938, 1954
7	Fussball Club Porto Alegre	1	1923–I
7	Militar FBC	1	1910
7	Novo Hamburgo	1	1937

== See also ==
- Wanderpreis Cup
