= 1997 Campeonato Gaúcho =

Campeonato Gaúcho
- Season: 1997
- Champions: Internacional
- Relegated: 14 de Julho; São Borja
- Copa do Brasil: Grêmio; Internacional
- Série C: Brasil de Pelotas; Caxias; São José; Internacional-SM; 15 de Novembro
- Matches played: 275
- Goals scored: 808 (2.94 per match)
- Top goalscorer: Marcus Vinícius (Guarani-VA) – 28 goals
- Biggest home win: Guarani-VA 7-1 Internacional-SM (March 2, 1997)
- Biggest away win: Brasil de Pelotas 0-4 Internacional-SM (March 9, 1997); 14 de Julho 0-4 15 de Novembro (March 19, 1997); 14 de Julho 0-4 São José (March 26, 1997); Grêmio Santanense 0-3 Internacional (April 16, 1997)
- Highest scoring: Guarani-VA 6-4 Passo Fundo (February 2, 1997)
- Longest unbeaten run: 15 de Novembro; Grêmio – 12 matches

The 77th season of the Campeonato Gaúcho kicked off on February 2, 1997, and ended on June 29, 1997. Twenty-eight teams participated. Internacional beat holders Grêmio in the finals and won their 33rd title. 14 de Julho and São Borja were relegated.

== Participating teams ==
Aimoré and Atlético de Carazinho withdrew before the start of the championship, and to replace them, São Borja and Farroupilha were promoted to the First level.

| Club | Home location | Previous season |
|---|---|---|
| 14 de Julho | Santana do Livramento | 24th |
| 15 de Novembro | Campo Bom | 26th |
| Brasil | Pelotas | 4th |
| Brasil | Farroupilha | 10th |
| Caxias | Caxias do Sul | 4th |
| Esportivo | Bento Gonçalves | 14th |
| Farroupilha | Pelotas | 4th (Second level) |
| Glória | Vacaria | 8th |
| Grêmio | Porto Alegre | 1st |
| Grêmio | Santana do Livramento | 11th |
| Guarani | Venâncio Aires | 16th |
| Guarany | Garibaldi | 23rd |
| Internacional | Porto Alegre | 5th |
| Internacional | Santa Maria | 20th |
| Juventude | Caxias do Sul | 2nd |
| Novo Hamburgo | Novo Hamburgo | 1st (Second level) |
| Palmeirense | Palmeira das Missões | 21st |
| Passo Fundo | Passo Fundo | 19th |
| Pelotas | Pelotas | 13th |
| São Borja | São Borja | 3rd (Second level) |
| São José | Porto Alegre | 1st (Second level) |
| São Luiz | Ijuí | 9th |
| São Paulo | Rio Grande | 25th |
| Santa Cruz | Santa Cruz do Sul | 17th |
| Santo Ângelo | Santo Ângelo | 3rd |
| Taquariense | Taquari | 22nd |
| Veranópolis | Veranópolis | 12th |
| Ypiranga | Erechim | 6th |

== System ==
The championship would have five stages:

- Division A: The fourteen teams all played each other in a single round-robin system. The eight best teams qualified to the Second phase, while the bottom two teams would dispute the Division B in the following year. Caxias and Brasil de Pelotas, due to their performance in the 1996 Copa Daltro Menezes, were automatically qualified regardless of placing and had one bonus point in the Second phase.
- Division B: The twelve teams that had qualified to Division B in the previous year joined the two teams that had been promoted from the Second level, and were divided into two groups of seven, in which each team played the teams of its own group in a double round-robin system. the best four teams in each group qualified to the Second phase of that division, the leader of each group earning a bonus point, while the three worst teams in each group would dispute the Relegation Playoffs. In the second phase, the remaining eight teams would be divided into two groups of four, in which each team played the teams of its own group in a double round-robin system. The beat team of each group would qualify to the Second phase of the championship, and to the Division A of the following year.
- Relegation Playoffs: The six teams that had qualified to this round played each other in a double round-robin format. The two teams with the fewest points were relegated.
- Second phase: The ten remaining teams were divided into two groups of five, in which each team played the teams of its own group in a double round-robin system. The two best teams in each group qualified to the Semifinals.
- Final rounds: The remaining four teams played a series of two-legged knockout ties to define the champions.

== Championship ==
=== Division A ===
| Pos | Team | Pld | W | D | L | GF | GA | GD | Pts | Qualification or relegation |
|---|---|---|---|---|---|---|---|---|---|---|
| 1 | Grêmio | 13 | 9 | 3 | 1 | 31 | 9 | +22 | 30 | Qualified |
| 2 | Juventude | 13 | 6 | 4 | 3 | 20 | 10 | +10 | 22 | Qualified |
| 3 | Caxias | 13 | 6 | 4 | 3 | 17 | 11 | +6 | 22 | Qualified |
| 4 | Brasil de Pelotas | 13 | 6 | 3 | 4 | 19 | 19 | 0 | 21 | Qualified |
| 5 | Internacional | 13 | 5 | 6 | 2 | 19 | 10 | +9 | 21 | Qualified |
| 6 | Pelotas | 13 | 6 | 2 | 5 | 21 | 21 | 0 | 20 | Qualified |
| 7 | Brasil de Farroupilha | 13 | 5 | 4 | 4 | 18 | 20 | −2 | 19 | Qualified |
| 8 | Veranópolis | 13 | 5 | 2 | 6 | 15 | 16 | −1 | 17 | Qualified |
| 9 | Glória | 13 | 5 | 2 | 6 | 17 | 19 | −2 | 17 | |
| 10 | Ypiranga de Erechim | 13 | 4 | 5 | 4 | 21 | 20 | +1 | 17 | |
| 11 | São Luiz | 13 | 5 | 1 | 7 | 16 | 16 | 0 | 16 | |
| 12 | Santo Ângelo | 13 | 3 | 1 | 9 | 14 | 26 | −12 | 10 | |
| 13 | Grêmio Santanense | 13 | 2 | 4 | 7 | 8 | 26 | −18 | 10 | 1998 Division B |
| 14 | Esportivo | 13 | 1 | 5 | 7 | 12 | 25 | −13 | 8 | 1998 Division B |

Updated to match(es) played on April 20, 1997. Source: RSSSF.com
Rules for classification: 1) points; 2) wins; 3) goal difference; 4) number of goals scored.

=== Division B ===
==== Group 1 ====
| Pos | Team | Pld | W | D | L | GF | GA | GD | Pts | Qualification or relegation |
|---|---|---|---|---|---|---|---|---|---|---|
| 1 | 15 de Novembro | 12 | 7 | 5 | 0 | 26 | 9 | +17 | 26 | Qualified |
| 2 | Taquariense | 12 | 6 | 3 | 3 | 18 | 17 | +1 | 21 | Qualified |
| 3 | Farroupilha | 12 | 4 | 5 | 3 | 19 | 16 | +3 | 17 | Qualified |
| 4 | São Paulo | 12 | 4 | 5 | 3 | 12 | 11 | +1 | 17 | Qualified |
| 5 | São José de Porto Alegre | 12 | 4 | 4 | 4 | 19 | 12 | +7 | 16 | Relegation Playoffs |
| 6 | Novo Hamburgo | 12 | 2 | 3 | 7 | 10 | 18 | −8 | 9 | Relegation Playoffs |
| 7 | 14 de Julho | 12 | 1 | 3 | 8 | 8 | 29 | −21 | 6 | Relegation Playoffs |

Updated to match(es) played on March 29, 1997. Source: RSSSF.com
Rules for classification: 1) points; 2) wins; 3) goal difference; 4) number of goals scored.

==== Group 2 ====
| Pos | Team | Pld | W | D | L | GF | GA | GD | Pts | Qualification or relegation |
|---|---|---|---|---|---|---|---|---|---|---|
| 1 | Guarani de Venâncio Aires | 12 | 7 | 1 | 4 | 36 | 18 | +18 | 22 | Qualified |
| 2 | Passo Fundo | 12 | 5 | 5 | 2 | 23 | 19 | +4 | 20 | Qualified |
| 3 | Santa Cruz | 12 | 6 | 1 | 5 | 19 | 21 | −2 | 19 | Qualified |
| 4 | Internacional de Santa Maria | 12 | 5 | 4 | 3 | 19 | 16 | +3 | 19 | Qualified |
| 5 | Guarany de Garibaldi | 12 | 4 | 3 | 5 | 19 | 21 | −2 | 15 | Relegation Playoffs |
| 6 | Palmeirense | 12 | 4 | 2 | 6 | 16 | 21 | −5 | 14 | Relegation Playoffs |
| 7 | São Borja | 12 | 3 | 0 | 9 | 6 | 24 | −18 | 9 | Relegation Playoffs |

Updated to match(es) played on March 29, 1997. Source: RSSSF.com
Rules for classification: 1) points; 2) wins; 3) goal difference; 4) number of goals scored.

==== Second phase ====
===== Group 3 =====
| Pos | Team | Pld | W | D | L | GF | GA | GD | Pts | Qualification or relegation |
|---|---|---|---|---|---|---|---|---|---|---|
| 1 | Santa Cruz | 6 | 4 | 1 | 1 | 14 | 8 | +6 | 13 | Qualified;1998 Division A |
| 2 | São Paulo | 6 | 2 | 3 | 1 | 9 | 9 | 0 | 9 | |
| 3 | Passo Fundo | 6 | 2 | 1 | 3 | 10 | 12 | −2 | 7 | |
| 4 | 15 de Novembro | 9 | 1 | 4 | 4 | 6 | 10 | −4 | 8 | |

Updated to match(es) played on April 23, 1997. Source: RSSSF.com
Rules for classification: 1) points; 2) wins; 3) goal difference; 4) number of goals scored.

===== Group 4 =====
| Pos | Team | Pld | W | D | L | GF | GA | GD | Pts | Qualification or relegation |
|---|---|---|---|---|---|---|---|---|---|---|
| 1 | Guarani de Venâncio Aires | 6 | 4 | 1 | 1 | 11 | 4 | +7 | 14 | Qualified;1998 Division A |
| 2 | Internacional de Santa Maria | 6 | 3 | 2 | 1 | 8 | 6 | +2 | 11 | |
| 3 | Taquariense | 6 | 3 | 1 | 2 | 10 | 7 | +3 | 10 | |
| 4 | Farroupilha | 6 | 0 | 0 | 6 | 4 | 16 | −12 | 0 | |

Updated to match(es) played on April 23, 1997. Source: RSSSF.com
Rules for classification: 1) points; 2) wins; 3) goal difference; 4) number of goals scored.

==== Relegation Playoffs ====
| Pos | Team | Pld | W | D | L | GF | GA | GD | Pts | Qualification or relegation |
|---|---|---|---|---|---|---|---|---|---|---|
| 1 | Palmeirense | 10 | 5 | 3 | 2 | 23 | 19 | +4 | 18 | |
| 2 | Novo Hamburgo | 10 | 5 | 1 | 4 | 16 | 15 | +1 | 16 | |
| 3 | São José de Porto Alegre | 10 | 3 | 4 | 3 | 16 | 15 | +1 | 13 | |
| 4 | Guarany de Garibaldi | 10 | 3 | 3 | 4 | 16 | 16 | 0 | 12 | |
| 5 | São Borja | 10 | 3 | 2 | 5 | 22 | 26 | −4 | 11 | Relegated |
| 6 | 14 de Julho | 10 | 1 | 7 | 2 | 12 | 14 | −2 | 10 | Relegated |

Updated to match(es) played on June 8, 1997. Source: RSSSF.com
Rules for classification: 1) points; 2) wins; 3) goal difference; 4) number of goals scored.

=== Second phase ===
==== Group 1 ====
| Pos | Team | Pld | W | D | L | GF | GA | GD | Pts | Qualification or relegation |
|---|---|---|---|---|---|---|---|---|---|---|
| 1 | Grêmio | 8 | 6 | 2 | 0 | 18 | 5 | +13 | 20 | Qualified |
| 2 | Veranópolis | 8 | 4 | 2 | 2 | 10 | 5 | +5 | 14 | Qualified |
| 3 | Pelotas | 8 | 2 | 5 | 1 | 16 | 12 | +4 | 11 | |
| 4 | Caxias | 8 | 1 | 4 | 3 | 12 | 14 | −2 | 8 | |
| 5 | Santa Cruz | 8 | 0 | 1 | 7 | 4 | 24 | −20 | 1 | |

Updated to match(es) played on June 15, 1997. Source: RSSSF.com
Rules for classification: 1) points; 2) wins; 3) goal difference; 4) number of goals scored.

==== Group 2 ====
| Pos | Team | Pld | W | D | L | GF | GA | GD | Pts | Qualification or relegation |
|---|---|---|---|---|---|---|---|---|---|---|
| 1 | Internacional | 8 | 5 | 2 | 1 | 17 | 5 | +12 | 17 | Qualified |
| 2 | Brasil de Pelotas | 8 | 4 | 1 | 3 | 11 | 10 | +1 | 14 | Qualified |
| 3 | Guarani de Venâncio Aires | 8 | 4 | 1 | 3 | 15 | 15 | 0 | 13 | |
| 4 | Juventude | 8 | 4 | 1 | 3 | 14 | 15 | −1 | 13 | |
| 5 | Brasil de Farroupilha | 8 | 0 | 1 | 7 | 11 | 23 | −12 | 1 | |

Updated to match(es) played on June 15, 1997. Source: RSSSF.com
Rules for classification: 1) points; 2) wins; 3) goal difference; 4) number of goals scored.

=== Semifinals ===
| Team 1 | Agg. | Team 2 | 1st leg | 2nd leg |
|---|---|---|---|---|
| Veranópolis | 2–4 (a.e.t) | Internacional | 2–1 | 0–3 |
| Brasil de Pelotas | 3–3 (p. 9-8) | Grêmio | 1–1 | 2–2 |

=== Finals ===
| Team 1 | Agg. | Team 2 | 1st leg | 2nd leg |
|---|---|---|---|---|
| Grêmio | 1–2 | Internacional | 1–1 | 0–1 |

25 June 1997
Finals

| Grêmio | 1 –1 | Internacional |
|---|---|---|
| Wagner Fernandes 3' | | Christian 39' |

Olímpico, Porto Alegre
Attendance: 33,416
Referee: Carlos Eugênio Simon
29 June 1997
Finals

| Internacional | 1 – 0 | Grêmio |
|---|---|---|
| Fabiano 49' |

Beira-Rio, Porto Alegre
Attendance: 36,450
Referee: Carlos Eugênio Simon

== Copa Galego ==
For the second semester, a state cup was held; the Copa Galego.

The twelve teams were divided into two groups of six, in which each team played the teams of its own group in a double round-robin format. The four best teams qualified into the Second phase, disputed under the same rules. The two best teams in each group won an automatic qualification into the Second phase of the 1998 championship, and the best teams in each group qualified to the Finals, disputed in two matches.

=== First phase ===
==== Group 1 ====
| Pos | Team | Pld | W | D | L | GF | GA | GD | Pts | Qualification or relegation |
|---|---|---|---|---|---|---|---|---|---|---|
| 1 | Internacional de Santa Maria | 10 | 6 | 2 | 2 | 15 | 7 | +8 | 20 | Qualified |
| 2 | 15 de Novembro | 10 | 6 | 1 | 3 | 15 | 12 | +3 | 19 | Qualified |
| 3 | Brasil de Pelotas | 10 | 5 | 2 | 3 | 13 | 8 | +5 | 17 | Qualified |
| 4 | São José de Porto Alegre | 10 | 3 | 3 | 4 | 13 | 11 | +2 | 12 | Qualified |
| 5 | São Paulo | 10 | 3 | 2 | 5 | 7 | 12 | −5 | 11 | |
| 6 | Taquariense | 10 | 1 | 1 | 8 | 5 | 18 | −13 | 4 | |

Updated to match(es) played on November 4, 1997. Source: RSSSF.com
Rules for classification: 1) points; 2) wins; 3) goal difference; 4) number of goals scored.

==== Group 2 ====
| Pos | Team | Pld | W | D | L | GF | GA | GD | Pts | Qualification or relegation |
|---|---|---|---|---|---|---|---|---|---|---|
| 1 | Passo Fundo | 10 | 4 | 4 | 2 | 11 | 10 | +1 | 16 | Qualified |
| 2 | Glória | 10 | 4 | 2 | 4 | 8 | 10 | −2 | 14 | Qualified |
| 3 | Ypiranga de Erechim | 10 | 3 | 5 | 2 | 7 | 7 | 0 | 14 | Qualified |
| 4 | São Luiz | 10 | 3 | 4 | 3 | 11 | 10 | +1 | 13 | Qualified |
| 5 | Brasil de Farroupilha | 10 | 2 | 6 | 2 | 11 | 9 | +2 | 12 | |
| 6 | Caxias | 10 | 2 | 3 | 5 | 11 | 13 | −2 | 9 | |

Updated to match(es) played on November 4, 1997. Source: RSSSF.com
Rules for classification: 1) points; 2) wins; 3) goal difference; 4) number of goals scored.

=== Second phase ===
==== Group 3 ====
| Pos | Team | Pld | W | D | L | GF | GA | GD | Pts | Qualification or relegation |
|---|---|---|---|---|---|---|---|---|---|---|
| 1 | São Luiz | 6 | 3 | 0 | 3 | 7 | 7 | 0 | 9 | Qualified to Finals and 1998 Second phase |
| 2 | Brasil de Pelotas | 6 | 2 | 3 | 1 | 7 | 6 | +1 | 9 | Qualified to 1998 Second phase |
| 3 | 15 de Novembro | 6 | 2 | 3 | 1 | 6 | 5 | +1 | 9 | |
| 4 | Passo Fundo | 6 | 1 | 2 | 3 | 6 | 8 | −2 | 5 | |

Updated to match(es) played on November 30, 1997. Source: RSSSF.com
Rules for classification: 1) points; 2) wins; 3) goal difference; 4) number of goals scored.

==== Group 4 ====
| Pos | Team | Pld | W | D | L | GF | GA | GD | Pts | Qualification or relegation |
|---|---|---|---|---|---|---|---|---|---|---|
| 1 | Glória | 6 | 3 | 2 | 1 | 8 | 6 | +2 | 11 | Qualified to Finals and 1998 Second phase |
| 2 | Internacional de Santa Maria | 6 | 2 | 2 | 2 | 10 | 9 | +1 | 8 | Qualified to 1998 Second phase |
| 3 | São José de Porto Alegre | 6 | 1 | 5 | 0 | 5 | 4 | +1 | 8 | |
| 4 | Ypiranga de Erechim | 6 | 0 | 3 | 3 | 5 | 9 | −4 | 3 | |

Updated to match(es) played on November 30, 1997. Source: RSSSF.com
Rules for classification: 1) points; 2) wins; 3) goal difference; 4) number of goals scored.

=== Finals ===
| Team 1 | Agg. | Team 2 | 1st leg | 2nd leg |
|---|---|---|---|---|
| São Luiz | 5–1 | Glória | 4–0 | 1–1 |
