= Navegantes, Porto Alegre =

Neighborhood in Porto Alegre, Brazil

- Neighborhood
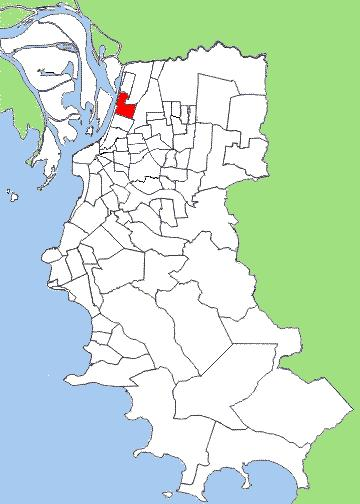
- Navegantes (marked in red) in Porto Alegre
- Interactive map of Navegantes, Porto Alegre
- Coordinates: 29°59′56″S 51°12′03″W
- Country: Brazil
- City: Porto Alegre
- State: Rio Grande do Sul

Area
  - Total: 174 ha (430 acres)

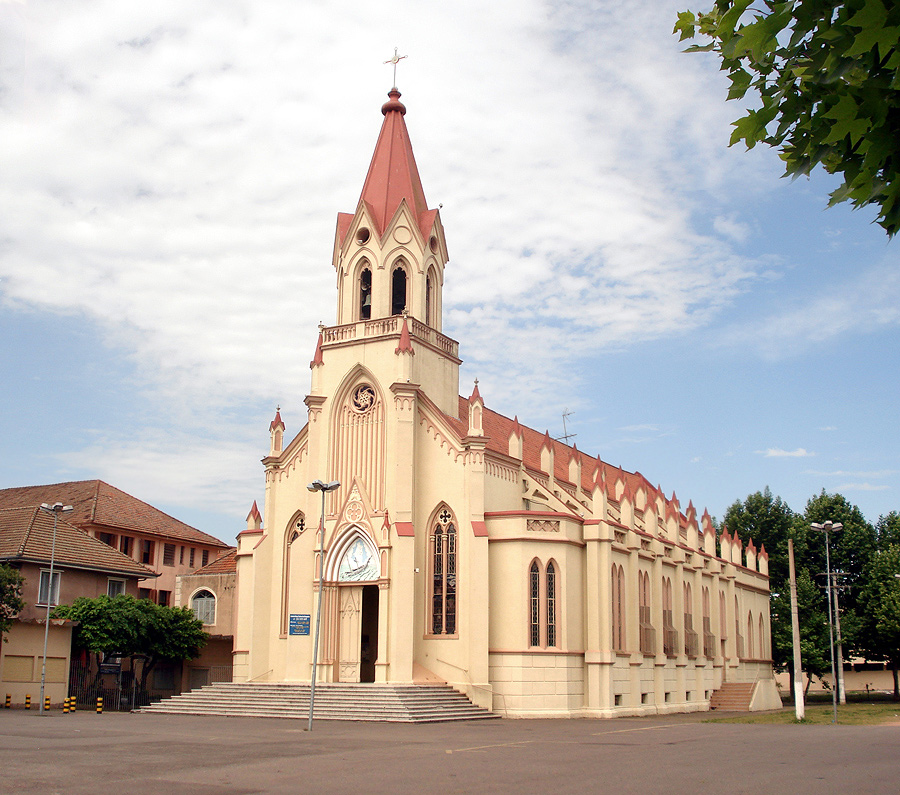
The Igreja de Nossa Senhora dos Navegantes, built in 1875.

Navegantes (meaning Seafarers in Portuguese) is a neighbourhood in the city of Porto Alegre, the state capital of Rio Grande do Sul, Brazil. It was created by Law 2022 from December 7, 1959, but had its limits modified due to the creation of Humaitá and Farrapos neighbourhoods by Law 6218 from November 17, 1986.

Close to Porto Alegre downtown, Navegantes was occupied by people coming from the German colonies in Rio Grande do Sul. Most of them worked as craftsmen and proletarians. In 1874, the Porto Alegre-Novo Hamburgo railroad was built and propelled its development as an industrial area. One of the enterprises from this time was the chocolate factory of Neugebauer, pioneer in the country.
