= Loivo =

Brazilian footballer

Personal information
- Full name: Loivo Ivan Johann
- Date of birth: 24 January 1945 (age 81)
- Place of birth: Brochier, Brazil
- Position: Left winger

Youth career
- Floriano

Senior career*
Years	Team	Apps	(Gls)
1965–1966	Floriano		
1967–1975	Grêmio	427	(77)
1976	Inter de Lages		
1977	Atlético Carazinho		
1978–1979	Novo Hamburgo		
- * Club domestic league appearances and goals as of 19 May 2024

Loivo Ivan Johann (born 24 January 1945), simply known as Loivo, is a Brazilian former professional footballer who played as a left winger.

== Career ==
Goal-scoring left winger, Loivo started his career at Floriano, now Novo Hamburgo. He played for Grêmio from 1967 to 1975, making 427 appearances and scoring 77 goals. He also played for Inter de Lages and Atlético Carazinho.

== Personal life ==
After retiring, he dedicated himself to the family business, specializing in the transportation and distribution of food. His brother, Rosalvo Antonio Johann, was president of EC Novo Hamburgo.

== Honours ==
Grêmio

- Campeonato Gaúcho: 1967, 1968
- Copa Río de La Plata: 1968
- Taça do Atlântico: 1971
