= 1981 Campeonato Gaúcho =

Campeonato Gaúcho
- Season: 1981
- Champions: Internacional
- Relegated: Armour; São Gabriel
- Taça de Ouro: Grêmio; Internacional; Internacional de Santa Maria
- Taça de Prata: Novo Hamburgo; Esportivo
- Matches played: 189
- Goals scored: 375 (1.98 per match)
- Top goalscorer: Baltazar (Grêmio) – 20 goals
- Biggest home win: Grêmio 6-1 Guarany de Bagé (June 7, 1981); Caxias 5-0 Armour (September 24, 1981); Internacional 5-0 São Borja (November 8, 1981)
- Biggest away win: Caxias 0-5 Grêmio (July 12, 1981)
- Highest scoring: Grêmio 6-1 Guarany de Bagé (June 7, 1981)

The 61st season of the Campeonato Gaúcho kicked off on June 7, 1981, and ended on November 29, 1981. Twelve teams participated. Internacional won their 26th title. Armour and São Gabriel were relegated.

== Participating teams ==
Club	Stadium	Home location	Previous season
Armour	Miguel Copatti	Santana do Livramento	1st (Second level)
Brasil	Bento Freitas	Pelotas	10th
Caxias	Centenário	Caxias do Sul	8th
Grêmio	Olímpico	Porto Alegre	1st
Guarany	Estrela D'Alva	Bagé	9th
Internacional	Beira-Rio	Porto Alegre	2nd
Internacional	Presidente Vargas	Santa Maria	4th
Juventude	Alfredo Jaconi	Caxias do Sul	6th
Novo Hamburgo	Santa Rosa	Novo Hamburgo	3rd
São Borja	Vicente Goulart	São Borja	5th
São Gabriel	Sílvio de Faria Corrêa	São Gabriel	2nd (Second level)
São Paulo	Aldo Dapuzzo	Rio Grande	7th

== System ==
The championship would have two stages.:

- First phase: The twelve clubs played each other in a double round-robin system. The eight best teams qualified to the Final phase, with the best teams and the best hinterland teams in each round earning one bonus point. the bottom two teams in the sum of both rounds were relegated.
- Final phase: The eight remaining teams played each other in a double round-robin system; the team with the most points won the title.

== Championship ==
=== First phase ===
==== First round ====
Pos	Team	Pld	W	D	L	GF	GA	GD	Pts	Qualification or relegation
1	Grêmio	11	7	4	0	26	5	+21	18	Qualified;One extra point
2	Internacional	11	6	3	2	14	6	+8	15	
3	Caxias	11	6	3	2	12	10	+2	15	Qualified;One extra point
4	Brasil de Pelotas	11	4	4	3	10	8	+2	12	
5	São Paulo	11	2	7	2	7	7	0	11	
6	Novo Hamburgo	11	3	3	5	8	11	−3	9	
7	São Gabriel	11	3	3	5	10	17	−7	9	
8	Guarany de Bagé	11	2	5	4	7	13	−6	9	
9	Internacional de Santa Maria	11	1	7	3	8	10	−2	9	
10	Juventude	11	1	7	3	2	9	−7	9	
11	Armour	11	2	4	5	10	17	−7	8	
12	São Borja	11	1	6	4	9	10	−1	8	

Updated to match(es) played on August 23, 1981. Source: RSSSF.com
Rules for classification: 1) points; 2) wins; 3) goal difference; 4) number of goals scored.

==== Second round ====
Pos	Team	Pld	W	D	L	GF	GA	GD	Pts	Qualification or relegation
1	Internacional	11	9	2	0	20	2	+18	20	Qualified;One extra point
2	Grêmio	11	8	3	0	20	3	+17	19	
3	Novo Hamburgo	11	5	4	2	7	5	+2	14 (Note: In case of ties between either the overall best teams or the best hinterland teams, a nextra match would be played. After Novo Hamburgo beat Inter de Santa Maria in the last round, equaling them in points, it was decided that instead of holding the playoff in another date, extra time and penalties to define the 'hinterland champions' would be played after the match; Novo Hamburgo won the penalty shootout.)	Qualified;One extra point
4	Internacional de Santa Maria	11	5	4	2	14	8	+6	14	
5	São Borja	11	2	7	2	6	7	−1	11	
6	São Paulo	11	4	3	4	8	9	−1	11	
7	Caxias	11	4	2	5	13	11	+2	10	
8	Brasil de Pelotas	11	3	3	5	8	9	−1	9	
9	Guarany de Bagé	11	1	5	5	5	14	−9	7	
10	Juventude	11	2	2	7	11	17	−6	6	
11	São Gabriel	11	2	2	7	6	20	−14	6	
12	Armour	11	0	5	6	9	22	−13	5	

Updated to match(es) played on October 7, 1981. Source: RSSSF.com
Rules for classification: 1) points; 2) wins; 3) goal difference; 4) number of goals scored.

==== Final standings ====
Pos	Team	Pld	W	D	L	GF	GA	GD	Pts	Qualification or relegation
1	Grêmio	22	15	7	0	46	8	+38	37	Qualified
2	Internacional	22	15	5	2	34	8	+26	35	Qualified
3	Caxias	22	10	5	7	25	21	+4	25	Qualified
4	Novo Hamburgo	22	8	7	7	15	16	−1	23	Qualified
5	Internacional de Santa Maria	22	6	11	5	22	18	+4	23	Qualified
6	São Paulo	22	6	10	6	15	16	−1	22	Qualified
7	Brasil de Pelotas	22	7	7	8	18	17	+1	21	Qualified
8	São Borja	22	3	13	6	15	17	−2	19	Qualified
9	Guarany de Bagé	22	3	10	9	12	27	−15	16	
10	São Gabriel	22	5	5	12	16	37	−21	15	Relegation Playouts
11	Juventude	22	3	9	10	13	26	−13	15	Relegation Playouts
12	Armour	22	2	9	11	19	39	−20	13	Relegated

Updated to match(es) played on October 7, 1981. Source: RSSSF.com
Rules for classification: 1) points; 2) wins; 3) goal difference; 4) number of goals scored.

==== Relegation Playouts ====
18 October 1981

Juventude	3 – 1	São Gabriel

Plátanos, Santa Cruz do Sul

São Gabriel relegated

=== Final phase ===
Pos	Team	Pld	W	D	L	GF	GA	GD	Pts	Qualification or relegation
1	Internacional	14	8	4	2	28	9	+19	21	Champions;1982 Taça de Ouro
2	Grêmio	14	7	5	2	17	9	+8	20	1982 Taça de Ouro
3	Internacional de Santa Maria	14	6	7	1	18	9	+9	19	1982 Taça de Ouro
4	Novo Hamburgo	14	5	5	4	15	16	−1	16	1982 Taça de Prata
5	São Paulo	14	5	3	6	15	21	−6	13	1982 Taça de Prata
6	Caxias	14	4	3	7	15	12	+3	12	
7	São Borja	14	3	3	8	8	22	−14	9	
8	Brasil de Pelotas	14	1	4	9	5	21	−16	6	

Updated to match(es) played on November 29, 1981. Source: RSSSF.com
Rules for classification: 1) points; 2) wins; 3) goal difference; 4) number of goals scored.
