= Sport Club Americano (Porto Alegre) =

Americano
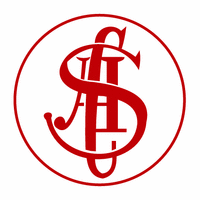
- Full name: Sport Club Americano
- Founded: June 4, 1912 (112 years ago)
- Dissolved: 1940s
- Ground: Estádio dos Eucaliptos, Porto Alegre, Rio Grande do Sul state, Brazil
- Capacity: 20,000
Home colors	Away colors

Sport Club Americano, commonly known as Americano, was a Brazilian football club from Porto Alegre, Rio Grande do Sul state. They won the Campeonato Gaúcho once.

== History ==
The club was founded on June 4, 1912, as Sport Club Hispano-Americano, changing the name to Sport Club Americano in the following year. They won the Campeonato Gaúcho in 1928. In the 1940s, the club merged with a team owned by a group of students, and it was renamed to Americano-Universitário, but the merge was a failure, and the club folded.

== Honours ==
=== State ===
- Campeonato Gaúcho
  - Winners (1): 1928

=== City ===
- Campeonato Citadino de Porto Alegre
  - Winners (3): 1924, 1928, 1929

== Stadium ==
Sport Club Americano played their home games at Estádio dos Eucaliptos. The stadium had a maximum capacity of 20,000 people.
