= Getúlio Vargas, Rio Grande do Sul =

Municipality in Rio Grande do Sul, Brazil

Coordinates: 27°53′24″S 52°13′40″W

- Municipality
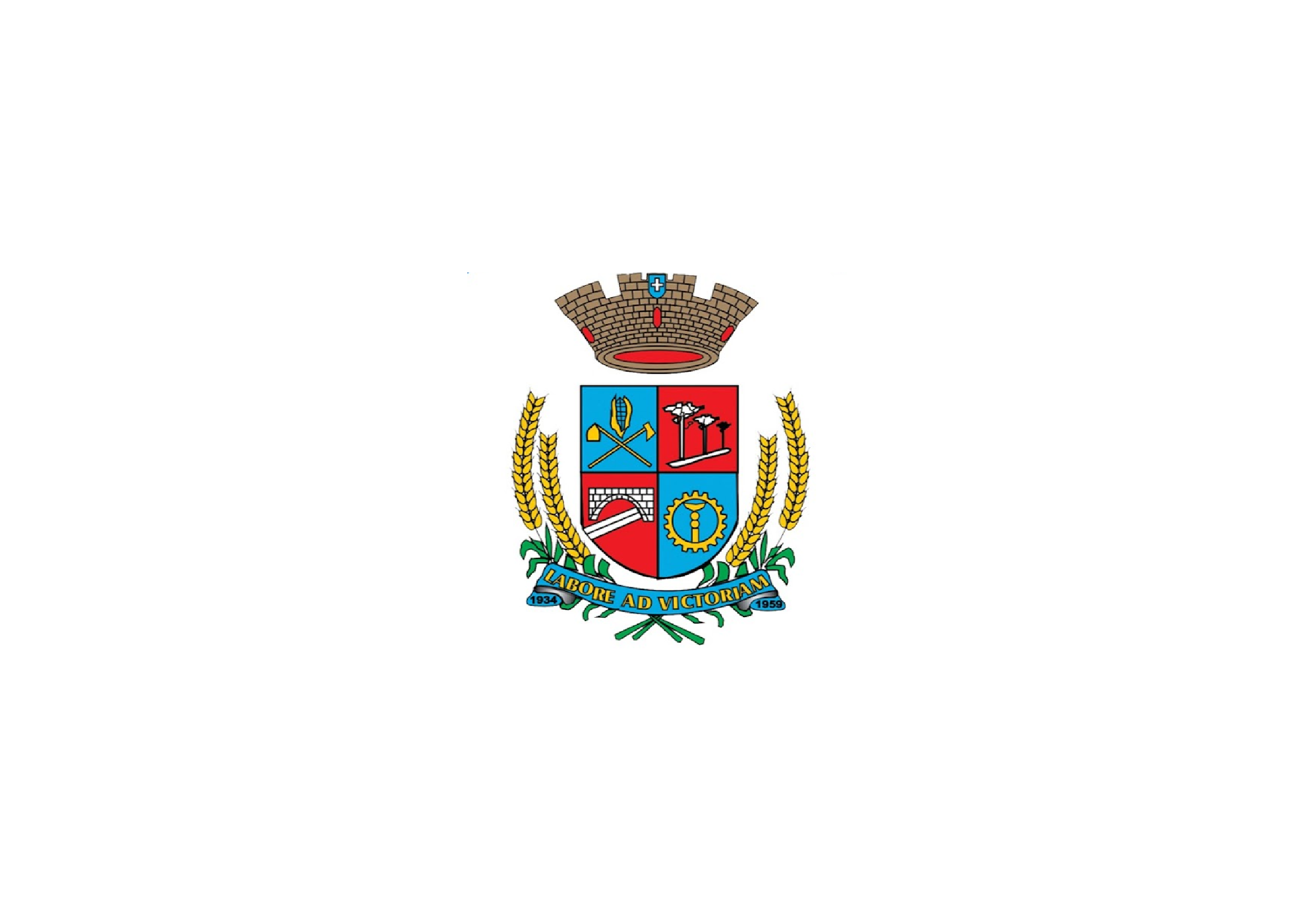
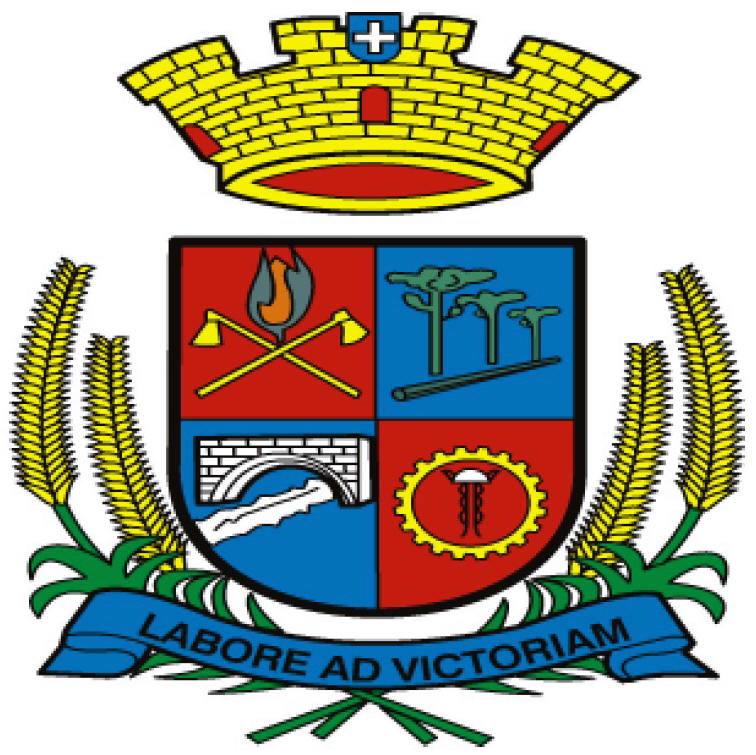
- Flag Coat of arms
- Interactive map of Getúlio Vargas, Rio Grande do Sul
- Country: Brazil
- Time zone: UTC−3 (BRT)

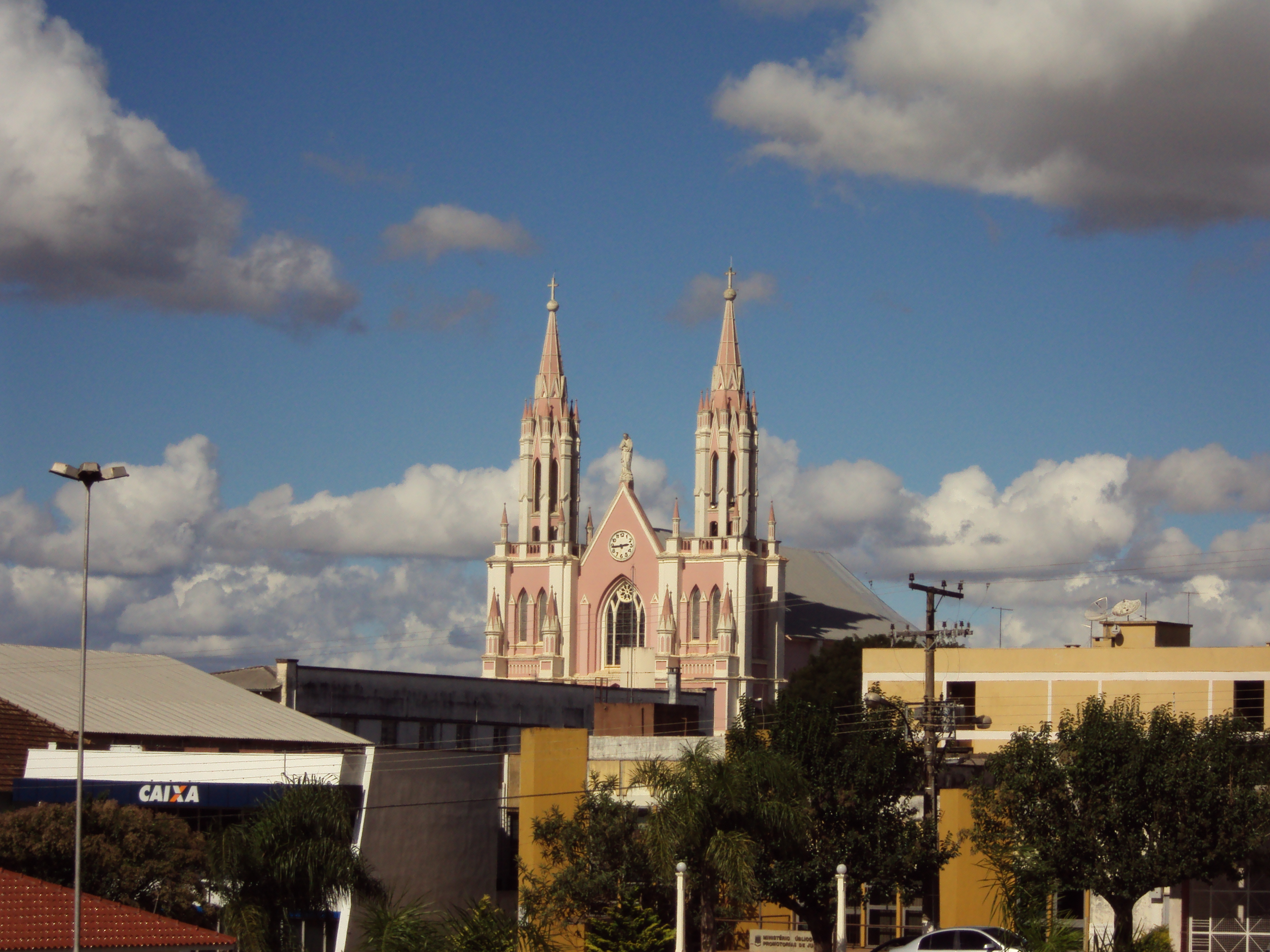

Getúlio Vargas is a municipality in the state of Rio Grande do Sul, Brazil. With an estimated population of 16,184 people in 2020, it occupies an area of 286.6 km^{2}. The municipality was named after the Brazilian President of the same name.

== See also ==
- List of municipalities in Rio Grande do Sul
