= 2014 Copa Serrana =

Copa Paulo Sérgio Poletto

Tournament details
- Country: Brazil
- Dates: 3 August – 16 November
- Teams: 7

The 2014 Copa Serrana (also known as the 2014 Copa Paulo Sérgio Poletto in this edition, in posthumous tribute) was the 2nd season of the Copa Serrana, a domestic cup in Rio Grande do Sul football, which is a knockout cup competition. The tournament began on 3 August and ended on 16 November with the final second leg.

In this year, seven clubs located in the mountainous region and northern of the state decided to participate in the Copa Serrana, which varies in number of participants according to the interest of clubs in the first, second and third divisions of the Campeonato Gaúcho. This time, Juventude decided to play the competition with the first team squad of his academy, the under-20s team, because of his participation in the Campeonato Brasileiro Série C.

The current holders are Passo Fundo, having won the title in the last edition, being the first champion in history. However, decided to not play the competition this year.

== Format ==
In the first stage, all teams face off in round-robin, which will qualify the top four for the next phase, known as the semi-finals. At this stage, the first placed facing the fourth place and second place playing against the third placed in two matches each. The winners face off in the final two matches to define the winner of the competition.

The 2014 Copa Serrana winners qualify for the 2014 Super Copa Gaúcha, where it will have the opportunity to qualify for 2015 Campeonato Brasileiro Série D. The winner of the Super Copa Gaúcha also dispute the 2015 Recopa Gaúcha, against the winner of 2014 Campeonato Gaúcho at the beginning of next season.

== Clubs ==
The following seven clubs compete in the Copa Serrana during the 2014 edition.

Club	City	Stadium	Capacity	Division in 2014	First app	Number of apps	Titles	Last title
Esportivo	Bento Gonçalves	Montanha dos Vinhedos	15,269	Série A1	2014	1	—	—
Garibaldi	Garibaldi	Alcides Santa Rosa	4,000	Série B	2014	1	—	—
Juventude	Caxias do Sul	Alfredo Jaconi	23,726	Série A1	2013	2	—	—
Marau	Marau	Carlos Renato Bebber	2,000	Série A2	2013	2	—	—
Panambi	Panambi	João Marimon Júnior	3,000	Série A2	2014	1	—	—
Veranópolis	Veranópolis	Antônio David Farina	4,000	Série A1	2014	1	—	—
Ypiranga-RS	Erechim	Colosso da Lagoa	30,000	Série A2	2014	1	—	—

== First round ==
=== Standings ===
Pos	Team	Pld	W	D	L	GF	GA	GD	Pts	Qualification
1	Esportivo	4	3	1	0	7	3	+4	10	Advances to semi-finals
2	Juventude	4	2	2	0	7	1	+6	8	Advances to semi-finals
3	Marau	4	2	0	2	2	3	−1	6	Advances to semi-finals
4	Garibaldi	4	2	0	2	3	7	−4	6	Advances to semi-finals
5	Ypiranga-RS	3	1	0	2	4	5	−1	3	
6	Panambi	5	0	3	2	4	6	−2	3	
7	Veranópolis	4	0	2	2	4	6	−2	2	

Source: FGF
Rules for classification: 1) points; 2) wins; 3) goal difference; 4) goals scored

=== Matches ===
3 August 1	Veranópolis	0 – 1	Esportivo	Veranópolis
15:00 UTC-03:00		Report	Heliardo 16'	Stadium: Antônio David Farina; Attendance: 70; Referee: Cleiton Pache

3 August 1	Marau	1 – 0	Panambi	Marau
18:00 UTC-03:00	Tuta 22'	Report		Stadium: Carlos Renato Bebber; Attendance: 152; Referee: Evander Bica

11 September 1	Ypiranga-RS	v	Juventude	Erechim
19:30 UTC-03:00				Stadium: Colosso da Lagoa
Note: Match rescheduled due to the participation of Juventude in the Campeonato Brasileiro Série C.

9 August 2	Esportivo	2 – 0	Marau	Bento Gonçalves
15:00 UTC-03:00	Heliardo 39'; Kelvin 60'	Report		Stadium: Montanha dos Vinhedos; Attendance: 81; Referee: Alexandre da Silva de Almeida

9 August 2	Juventude	1 – 1	Veranópolis	Farroupilha
15:00 UTC-03:00	Kayron 80'	Report	Maurizan 59'	Stadium: Estádio das Castanheiras; Attendance: 56; Referee: Charles Martins Lemos

10 August 2	Panambi	1 – 2	Garibaldi	Panambi
19:00 UTC-03:00	Rodrigo Dias 25'	Report	Lukinha 67'; Jajá 88'	Stadium: João Marimon Júnior; Attendance: 28; Referee: Cristiano Silva Santos

17 August 3	Veranópolis	1 – 1	Panambi	Veranópolis
15:00 UTC-03:00	Elói 64'	Report	Maurício 90'	Stadium: Antônio David Farina; Referee: Ademir Zulianello

17 August 3	Marau	0 – 1	Juventude	Marau
15:00 UTC-03:00		Report	Kayron 13'	Stadium: Carlos Renato Bebber; Attendance: 213; Referee: Janvie Baroni

17 August 3	Garibaldi	1 – 0	Ypiranga-RS	Garibaldi
16:30 UTC-03:00	Jajá 13'	Report		Stadium: Alcides Santa Rosa; Attendance: 45; Referee: Demódio Luiz da Silva Wagner

24 August 4	Juventude	5 – 0	Garibaldi	Farroupilha
15:00 UTC-03:00	Guilherme 23'; Brenner 40', 58', 77'; Jeferson 80'	Report		Stadium: Estádio das Castanheiras; Attendance: 59; Referee: Éder Davi Zanella

24 August 4	Ypiranga-RS	3 – 2	Veranópolis	Erechim
15:00 UTC-03:00	Matheus 22'; Amaral 50'; Hyantony 90+1'	Report	Rafael Gevehr 44'; Richard 67'	Stadium: Colosso da Lagoa; Referee: Edegar da Silva Frick

24 August 4	Panambi	2 – 2	Esportivo	Panambi
19:00 UTC-03:00	Júnior Santos 39'; Alexandre 57'	Report	Robinson 28'; Vágner 65'	Stadium: João Marimon Júnior; Referee: Marcos Antônio Sacon

30 August 5	Juventude	0 – 0	Panambi	Farroupilha
15:00 UTC-03:00		Report		Stadium: Estádio das Castanheiras; Referee: Fábio Souza

30 August 5	Esportivo	2 – 1	Ypiranga-RS	Bento Gonçalves
15:00 UTC-03:00	Robinson 64'; Heliardo 67'	Report	Hyantony 33'	Stadium: Montanha dos Vinhedos; Referee: Marcus Vinícius G. dos Santos

30 August 5	Garibaldi	0 – 1	Marau	Garibaldi
18:30 UTC-03:00		Report	Bahia 89'	Stadium: Alcides Santa Rosa; Referee: Ivanir Beber

5 September 6	Veranópolis	2 – 0	Garibaldi	Veranópolis
20:00 UTC-03:00	Rafael Lima 37'; Alan 73'			Stadium: Antônio David Farina; Referee: Alexandre Almeida

6 September 6	Esportivo	v	Juventude	Bento Gonçalves
15:00 UTC-03:00				Stadium: Montanha dos Vinhedos

6 September 6	Ypiranga-RS	v	Marau	Erechim
16:00 UTC-03:00				Stadium: Colosso da Lagoa

14 September 7	Marau	v	Veranópolis	Marau
15:00 UTC-03:00				Stadium: Carlos Renato Bebber

14 September 7	Garibaldi	v	Esportivo	Garibaldi
15:00 UTC-03:00				Stadium: Alcides Santa Rosa

14 September 7	Panambi	v	Ypiranga-RS	Panambi
15:00 UTC-03:00				Stadium: João Marimon Júnior

== Records and statistics ==
=== Goalscorers ===
Are exposed here the goalscorers of the competition.

Rank	Player	Club	Goals
1	(Brazil) Heliardo	Esportivo	3
1	(Brazil) Brenner	Juventude	3
3	(Brazil) Robinson	Esportivo	2
3	(Brazil) Jajá	Garibaldi	2
3	(Brazil) Kayron	Juventude	2
3	(Brazil) Hyantony	Ypiranga-RS	2
7	17 players		1
