= Copa Serrana =

- Founded: 2013
- Abolished: 2016
- Region: Rio Grande do Sul
- Number of teams: 7
- Website: Official website

The Campeonato da Região Serrana, commonly known as the Copa Serrana, is an annual competition organized by the Rio Grande do Sul state football federation for clubs that are in the first, second and third divisions of the Campeonato Gaúcho and are located in the mountainous region and northern of the state. It is held in the second half of the year and usually clubs participating in the higher levels of the Campeonato Brasileiro do not participate with the first team squad, using his academy.

The competition was founded in 2013, being a qualifying tournament for the Super Copa Gaúcha, where the winner ensures participation in the Campeonato Brasileiro Série D of the following year. The Copa Serrana occasionally receive a different name, honoring important people related to football in Rio Grande do Sul. The 2014 edition is called Copa Paulo Sérgio Poletto, in posthumous tribute to former Grêmio and Ypiranga-RS manager who died in April of the same year.

The current holders are Passo Fundo, having beaten the Lajeadense by 2–1 aggregate in the 2013 finals. With this title, the Passo Fundo became the first winner of the Copa Serrana in history.

== History ==
Over the past decades, one of the major problems of Brazilian football has been the lack of an annual schedule for smaller clubs. These teams usually played in the state leagues and in the rest of the year closed, only reopening in the following year. Thus, FGF decided to create new competitions for this to not occur more, creating three regional tournaments: the Copa Serrana, the Copa Metropolitana and the Copa Sul-Fronteira. Along with the traditional domestic cup, the Copa FGF, the winners qualify for the Super Copa Gaúcha, where the four clubs play a qualification for the Campeonato Brasileiro Série D and also a place in the dispute of the state supercup, the Recopa Gaúcha, against the champion of the Campeonato Gaúcho.

The first edition of the Copa Serrana was held in the second half of 2013, with the participation of six clubs of the mountainous region and northern of the state. The finals was played between Passo Fundo, winner of the first round, and Lajeadense, winner of the second round. The Passo Fundo won by 2–1 aggregate, winning the first title.

== Format ==
=== Competition ===
In the first stage, all teams face off in round-robin, which will qualify the top four for the next phase, known as the semi-finals. At this stage, the first placed facing the fourth place and second place playing against the third placed in two matches each. The winners face off in the final two matches to define the winner of the competition.

=== Qualification for competitions ===
The Copa Serrana winners qualify for the Super Copa Gaúcha, where it will have the opportunity to qualify for next year's Campeonato Brasileiro Série D. The winner of the Super Copa Gaúcha also dispute the Recopa Gaúcha, against the winner of Campeonato Gaúcho at the beginning of next season.

== Clubs ==
Having been established in 2013, the Copa Serrana is played by clubs located in the mountainous region and northern of the Rio Grande do Sul and compete in the first, second or third division of the Campeonato Gaúcho. The following seven clubs will compete in the Copa Serrana during the 2014 edition.

Club	City	Stadium	Capacity	Division in 2014	First app	Number of apps	Titles	Last title
Esportivo	Bento Gonçalves	Montanha dos Vinhedos	15,269	Série A1	2014	1	—	—
Garibaldi	Garibaldi	Alcides Santa Rosa	4,000	Série B	2014	1	—	—
Juventude	Caxias do Sul	Alfredo Jaconi	23,726	Série A1	2013	2	—	—
Marau	Marau	Carlos Renato Bebber	2,000	Série A2	2013	2	—	—
Panambi	Panambi	João Marimon Júnior	3,000	Série A2	2014	1	—	—
Veranópolis	Veranópolis	Antônio David Farina	4,000	Série A1	2014	1	—	—
Ypiranga-RS	Erechim	Colosso da Lagoa	30,000	Série A2	2014	1	—	—

== Records and statistics ==
=== List of champions ===
Below is the complete list of winners and runners-up of the competition.

Season	Champions	Runners-up
2013	Passo Fundo (1)	Lajeadense
2014	Juventude B (1)	Veranópolis
2015	União Frederiquense (1)	Novo Hamburgo
2016	Caxias (1)	Ypiranga

=== Goalscorers ===
Are exposed here the goalscorers of all editions of the competition.

Season	Player(s)	Club(s)	Goals
2013	(Brazil) Hyantony	Passo Fundo	5
2014	—	—	—

== See also ==
- Campeonato Gaúcho
- Campeonato Gaúcho (lower levels)
- Copa FGF
- Copa Metropolitana
- Copa Sul-Fronteira
