= 2014 Copa FGF =

Copa Fernandão

Tournament details
- Country: Rio Grande do Sul, Brazil
- Dates: 6 August – 8 October
- Teams: 22

The 2014 Copa FGF (also known as the 2014 Copa Fernandão in this edition, in posthumous tribute) was the 11th season of the Copa FGF, the main domestic cup competition in Rio Grande do Sul football, which is a knockout cup competition. The tournament began on 6 August and ended on 8 October with the second leg of final.

In this year, 22 clubs of the state decided to participate in the Copa FGF, which varies in number of participants according to the interest of clubs in the first, second and third divisions of the Campeonato Gaúcho. This time, one of the two greatest clubs in the state, the Grêmio, decided to not participate of the competition.

Novo Hamburgo enters in the 2014 Copa FGF defending his title won in 2013.

== Format ==
The competition is a knockout tournament with pairings for first round (round of 22) drawn at random, being the best placed club in the FGF Club Ranking plays the first leg at away. If that club wins by a difference of two or more goals, it will be automatically qualified for the next round. The same rules serves to Round of 12. From the quarter-finals, the order of matches is decided by lot and the second leg is required.

Twenty-two clubs beginning in the round of 22, being the winners and the best loser advancing to the second round. In the round of 12, the winners and the two best losers qualify for the quarter-finals. Thereafter, only the winners advance to the semifinals and the finals.

The Copa FGF winner qualify for the 2015 Copa do Brasil and for 2014 Super Copa Gaúcha, where it will have the opportunity to qualify for the 2015 Campeonato Brasileiro Série D.

== Clubs ==
This time, Juventude decided to play the competition with the first team squad of his academy, the under-20s team, because of his participation in the Campeonato Brasileiro Série C. Well as the International, which traditionally plays with his academy. The following 22 clubs compete in the Copa FGF during the 2014 edition.

Club	City	Stadium	Capacity	Division in 2014	First app	Number of apps	Titles	Last title
Aimoré	São Leopoldo	Cristo Rei	10,000	Série A1	2006	5	—	—
Bagé	Bagé	Pedra Moura	12,000	Série B	2008	3	—	—
Brasil (PE)	Pelotas	Bento Freitas	18,000	Série A1	2004	8	—	—
Cerâmica	Gravataí	Vieirão	8,000	Série A1	2007	7	—	—
Esportivo	Bento Gonçalves	Mont. dos Vinhedos	15,269	Série A1	2004	5	1	2004
Estância Velha	Canoas	Estádio das Cabriúvas	5,000	Série B	2014	1	—	—
Farroupilha	Pelotas	Nicolau Fico	8,000	Série B	2004	4	—	—
Garibaldi	Garibaldi	Alcides Santa Rosa	4,000	Série B	2007	1	—	—
Guarani (VA)	Venâncio Aires	Edmundo Feix	4,000	Série B	2005	2	—	—
Guarany (BG)	Bagé	Estrela D'Alva	10,000	Série B	2006	4	—	—
Internacional	Porto Alegre	Morada dos Quero-Queros	2,000	Série A1	2004	10	2	2010
Juventude	Caxias do Sul	Alfredo Jaconi	23,726	Série A1	2004	9	2	2012
Lajeadense	Lajeado	Arena Alviazul	7,000	Série A1	2005	7	—	—
Marau	Marau	Carlos Renato Bebber	2,000	Série A2	2014	1	—	—
Novo Hamburgo	Novo Hamburgo	Estádio do Vale	6,500	Série A1	2004	9	2	2013
Panambi	Panambi	João Marimon Júnior	3,000	Série A2	2014	1	—	—
Pelotas	Pelotas	Boca do Lobo	18,000	Série A1	2004	8	1	2008
Santa Cruz-RS	Santa Cruz do Sul	Estádio dos Plátanos	7,000	Série A2	2014	1	—	—
São José-RS	Porto Alegre	Passo D'Areia	8,000	Série A1	2004	9	—	—
São Paulo-RS	Rio Grande	Aldo Dapuzzo	11,500	Série A1	2004	7	—	—
Veranópolis	Veranópolis	Antônio David Farina	4,000	Série A1	2004	1	—	—
Ypiranga-RS	Erechim	Colosso da Lagoa	30,000	Série A2	2006	4	—	—

== First round ==
=== Standings ===
Team 1	Agg.	Team 2	1st leg	2nd leg
Farroupilha	1–8	Lajeadense	1–5	0–3
Aimoré	0–0 (4–5 p)	Veranópolis	0–0	0–0
Juventude	2–4	Ypiranga-RS	0–1	2–3
Internacional	1–0	Novo Hamburgo	0–0	1–0
Estância Velha	3–1	Panambi	0–1	3–0
Pelotas	2–2 (a)	Guarani (VA)	1–0	1–2
Cerâmica	0–2	São José-RS	0–0	0–2
Garibaldi	1–1 (a)	Esportivo	0–0	1–1
Guarany (BG)	W.O.	Marau	—	—
Santa Cruz-RS	4–3	Bagé	1–2	3–1
São Paulo-RS	1–2	Brasil (PE)	0–1	1–1

Note: Guarany (BG) decided to not participate of the cup. Marau is automatically qualified.

=== Matches ===
==== First leg ====
6 August	São José-RS	0–0	Cerâmica	Porto Alegre
15:00 UTC-03:00		Report		Stadium: Passo D'Areia; Attendance: 0 Referee: Anderson da Silveira Farias

6 August	Esportivo	0–0	Garibaldi	Bento Gonçalves
15:00 UTC-03:00		Report		Stadium: Montanha dos Vinhedos; Attendance: 65; Referee: Marcus Vinícius dos Santos

6 August	Lajeadense	5–1	Farroupilha	Lajeado
20:00 UTC-03:00	Paulo Josué 3', 73'; Michel 67'; Gilmar 82'; Lima 90+1'	Report	Fábio Alemão 43'	Stadium: Arena Alviazul; Referee: Lucas Guimarães R. Horn

6 August	Veranópolis	0–0	Aimoré	Veranópolis
20:00 UTC-03:00		Report		Stadium: Antônio David Farina; Attendance: 25; Referee: Márcio Bombassaro

6 August	Ypiranga-RS	1–0	Juventude	Erechim
20:00 UTC-03:00	Cleyton 63'	Report		Stadium: Colosso da Lagoa; Attendance: 324; Referee: Marcos Antônio Sacon

6 August	Novo Hamburgo	0–0	Internacional	Novo Hamburgo
20:00 UTC-03:00		Report		Stadium: Estádio do Vale; Attendance: 33; Referee: Charles Martins Lemos

6 August	Panambi	1–0	Estância Velha	Panambi
20:00 UTC-03:00	Júnior Santos 75'	Report		Stadium: João Marimon Júnior; Attendance: 36; Referee: Felipe Boeno Lermen

6 August	Bagé	2–1	Santa Cruz-RS	Bagé
20:00 UTC-03:00	Luís 45'; Serjão 55'	Report	Kleyton 45+1'	Stadium: Pedra Moura; Attendance: 196; Referee: David Baquini da Silva

6 August	Brasil (PE)	1–0	São Paulo-RS	Rio Grande
20:30 UTC-03:00	Nunes 72'	Report		Stadium: Aldo Dapuzzo; Attendance: 1,192; Referee: Gilmar Nunes dos Santos

7 August	Guarani (VA)	0–1	Pelotas	Venâncio Aires
20:00 UTC-03:00		Report	Éber 75'	Stadium: Edmundo Feix; Attendance: 50; Referee: Jonathan B. Pinheiro

==== Second leg ====
12 August	São Paulo-RS	1–1	Brasil (PE)	Pelotas
20:30 UTC-03:00	Vavá 12'	Report	Nena 19'	Stadium: Bento Freitas; Attendance: 516; Referee: Anderson Echeverria

13 August	Juventude	2–3	Ypiranga-RS	Farroupilha
15:00 UTC-03:00	Augusto 4'; Guilherme 36'	Report	Saldanha 2', 7'; Cleyton 84'	Stadium: Estádio das Castanheiras; Attendance: 0 Referee: Alessandro Vanni Mocelin

13 August	Internacional	1–0	Novo Hamburgo	Alvorada
15:00 UTC-03:00	Taiberson 55'	Report		Stadium: Morada dos Quero-Queros; Referee: Marcelo Cavalheiro Pereira

13 August	Estância Velha	3–0	Panambi	Campo Bom
15:00 UTC-03:00	Tairone 51'; Douglas 54'; Dias 90'	Report		Stadium: Sady Schmidt; Attendance: 10; Referee: Charles Martins Lemos

13 August	Cerâmica	0–2	São José-RS	Gravataí
15:00 UTC-03:00		Report	Wagner 44'; Jô 89'	Stadium: Estádio Vieirão; Attendance: 36; Referee: Lucas Guimarães R. Horn

13 August	Aimoré	0–0 (4–5 p)	Veranópolis	São Leopoldo
20:00 UTC-03:00		Report		Stadium: Cristo Rei; Attendance: 63; Referee: Daniel Santos Noronha
	Penalties
	(penalty scored) Michel; (penalty scored) Mikael; (penalty scored) Faísca; (penalty scored) Diego Rocha; (penalty missed) Luanderson; (penalty missed) Alex Pires; (penalty missed) Cleberson		(penalty scored) Rafael Gevehr; (penalty scored) Marcelo Pastel; (penalty scored) Vanderlei; (penalty scored) Allan; (penalty missed) Luiz Grando; (penalty missed) Richard; (penalty scored) Elói

13 August	Pelotas	1–2	Guarani (VA)	Pelotas
20:00 UTC-03:00	Escobar 59'	Report	Rafael 29'; Paulinho 90+2'	Stadium: Boca do Lobo; Attendance: 430; Referee: Bruno Mattos Criscuoli

13 August	Garibaldi	1–1	Esportivo	Garibaldi
19:30 UTC-03:00	Lukinha 8'	Report	Robinson 3'	Stadium: Alcides Santa Rosa; Attendance: 45; Referee: Fernando Luis Bertin

14 August	Farroupilha	0–3	Lajeadense	Pelotas
15:00 UTC-03:00		Report	Thiago 31'; Michel 34'; Gilmar 78'	Stadium: Nicolau Fico; Attendance: 60; Referee: Francisco Soares Dias

14 August	Santa Cruz-RS	3–1	Bagé	Santa Cruz do Sul
20:00 UTC-03:00	Kleyton 42'; Ilson 53' (o.g.); Carlos Eduardo 62'	Report	Fernando 57'	Stadium: Estádio dos Plátanos; Attendance: 96; Referee: Eleno González Todeschini

== Second round ==
The draw for the second round take place at the headquarters of FGF on 15 August at 15:00 UTC-03:00. At this stage, the twelve clubs qualified of the first round plays eight places in the quarter-finals of the competition. Two teams from third division of Campeonato Gaúcho have qualified for this stage: Estância Velha and Guarani (VA). On the other side, several first division clubs were eliminated in the first round, including Juventude.

=== Standings ===
Team 1	Agg.	Team 2	1st leg	2nd leg
Pelotas	1–0	Brasil (PE)	0–0	1–0
Santa Cruz-RS	1–1 (a)	São José-RS	0–0	1–1
Veranópolis	0–2	Internacional	0–1	0–1
Guarani (VA)	3–1	Ypiranga-RS	0–0	3–1
Estância Velha	1–10	Lajeadense	1–6	0–4
Esportivo	2–2 (3–4 p)	Marau	0–2	2–0

=== Matches ===
==== First leg ====
20 August	São José-RS	0–0	Santa Cruz-RS	Porto Alegre
15:00 UTC-03:00		Report		Stadium: Passo D'Areia; Attendance: 20; Referee: David Baquini da Silva

20 August	Internacional	1–0	Veranópolis	Porto Alegre
19:00 UTC-03:00	Romário 62'	Report		Stadium: Beira-Rio; Referee: Daniel Aloysius Soder

20 August	Brasil (PE)	0–0	Pelotas	Pelotas
20:00 UTC-03:00		Report		Stadium: Bento Freitas; Attendance: 3,104; Referee: Jean Pyerre Gonçalves Lima

20 August	Ypiranga-RS	0–0	Guarani (VA)	Erechim
20:00 UTC-03:00		Report		Stadium: Colosso da Lagoa; Referee: Luciano Prudente

20 August	Lajeadense	6–1	Estância Velha	Lajeado
20:00 UTC-03:00	Vinícius 19'; Márcio Marabá 45', 66'; Mateus Santana 55'; Paulo Josué 57'; Lucas Winck 71'	Report	Tairone 12'	Stadium: Arena Alviazul; Attendance: 49; Referee: Marcelo Cavalheiro Pereira

20 August	Marau	2–0	Esportivo	Marau
20:00 UTC-03:00	Emílio 59'; Araújo 90+3'	Report		Stadium: Carlos Renato Bebber; Attendance: 82; Referee: Felipe Boeno Lermen

==== Second leg ====
24 August	Pelotas	1–0	Brasil (PE)	Pelotas
15:30 UTC-03:00	Bruno Salvador 45+1'	Report		Stadium: Boca do Lobo; Attendance: 1,710; Referee: Daniel Nobre Bins

27 August	Santa Cruz-RS	1–1	São José-RS	Santa Cruz do Sul
15:00 UTC-03:00	Ramon 35'	Report	Brida 38' (pen.)	Stadium: Estádio dos Plátanos; Attendance: 127; Referee: Charles Martins Lemos

27 August	Estância Velha	0–4	Lajeadense	Campo Bom
15:00 UTC-03:00		Report	Mateus Santana 1'; Paulo Josué 6'; Vinícius 52'; Gilmar 90+3'	Stadium: Sady Schmidt; Referee: Anderson da Silveira Farias

27 August	Esportivo	2–0 (3–4 p)	Marau	Bento Gonçalves
15:00 UTC-03:00	Heliardo 40'; Marcinho 80'	Report		Stadium: Montanha dos Vinhedos; Attendance: 25; Referee: Jorge Luiz da Silva A. Júnior
	Penalties
	Heliardo (penalty scored); Róbson (penalty scored); Thiaguinho (penalty missed) (penalty missed); Marcinho (penalty scored)		(penalty missed) Marquinhos; (penalty scored) Renan; (penalty scored) Ricardinho; (penalty scored) Araújo; (penalty scored) Da Silva

27 August	Veranópolis	0–1	Internacional	Veranópolis
20:00 UTC-03:00		Report	Maurides 65'	Stadium: Antônio David Farina; Attendance: 54; Referee: Fernando Luís Bertin

27 August	Guarani (VA)	3–1	Ypiranga-RS	Venâncio Aires
20:00 UTC-03:00	Paulinho 27'; Carlinhos 51'; William Ribeiro 68'	Report	Hyantony 90'	Stadium: Edmundo Feix; Attendance: 53; Referee: Douglas Schwengber da Silva

== Quarter-finals ==
The draw for the quarter-finals will take place at the headquarters of FGF on 28 August at 15:30 UTC-03:00. A total of 8 teams compete in this round, of which the four winners advances to semi-finals. Only two clubs not dispute the first division of the Campeonato Gaúcho, they being the Santa Cruz-RS, which is currently in the Série A2, and the Guarani (VA), a third division team what makes a brilliant campaign and has advanced against two clubs of the Série A.

=== Standings ===
Team 1	Agg.	Team 2	1st leg	2nd leg
Santa Cruz-RS	1–3	Lajeadense	0–1	1–2
Esportivo	2–2 (a)	São José-RS	0–1	2–1
Marau	1–3	Internacional	1–2	0–1
Pelotas	2–2 (a)	Guarani (VA)	0–0	2–2

=== Matches ===
==== First leg ====
3 September	São José-RS	1–0	Esportivo	Porto Alegre
15:00 UTC-03:00	Héber Collazo 87'	Report		Stadium: Passo D'Areia; Referee: Daniel Nobre Bins

3 September	Internacional	2–1	Marau	Alvorada
15:00 UTC-03:00	Maurides 18'; Aylon 30'	Report	Roni 9'	Stadium: Morada dos Quero-Queros; Referee: Diego Almeida Real

3 September	Guarani (VA)	0–0	Pelotas	Venâncio Aires
15:30 UTC-03:00		Report		Stadium: Edmundo Feix; Referee: Francisco de P. dos S. S. Neto

3 September	Lajeadense	1–0	Santa Cruz-RS	Lajeado
20:00 UTC-03:00	Gilmar 90'	Report		Stadium: Arena Alviazul; Referee: Luís Teixeira Rocha

==== Second leg ====
10 September	Santa Cruz-RS	1–2	Lajeadense	Santa Cruz do Sul
15:00 UTC-03:00				Stadium: Estádio dos Plátanos

10 September	Esportivo	2–1	São José-RS	Bento Gonçalves
15:00 UTC-03:00				Stadium: Montanha dos Vinhedos

10 September	Marau	0–1	Internacional	Marau
20:00 UTC-03:00				Stadium: Carlos Renato Bebber

11 September	Pelotas	2–2	Guarani (VA)	Pelotas
20:00 UTC-03:00				Stadium: Boca do Lobo

== Records and statistics ==
=== Goalscorers ===
This is the complete list of goalscorers in the 2014 Copa FGF. Players and teams in bold are still active in the competition.

Rank	Player	Club	Goals
1	(Brazil) **Gilmar**	**Lajeadense**	4
1	(Brazil) **Paulo Josué**	**Lajeadense**	4
3	(Brazil) Tairone	Estância Velha	2
3	(Brazil) **Paulinho**	**Guarani (VA)**	2
3	(Brazil) **Maurides**	**Internacional**	2
3	(Brazil) **Márcio Marabá**	**Lajeadense**	2
3	(Brazil) **Mateus Santana**	**Lajeadense**	2
3	(Brazil) **Michel**	**Lajeadense**	2
3	(Brazil) **Vinícius**	**Lajeadense**	2
3	(Brazil) **Kleyton**	**Santa Cruz-RS**	2
3	(Brazil) Cleyton	Ypiranga-RS	2
3	(Brazil) Saldanha	Ypiranga-RS	2
13	38 players		1

=== Highest attendances ===
The 10 highest attendances of the competition are listed here.

Rank	Attendance	Home	Result	Away	Stadium	City	Date	Round
1	3,104	Brasil (PE)	0–0	Pelotas	Bento Freitas	Pelotas	20 August	Second round
2	1,710	Pelotas	1–0	Brasil (PE)	Boca do Lobo	Pelotas	24 August	Second round
3	1,192	Brasil (PE)	1–0	São Paulo-RS	Aldo Dapuzzo	Rio Grande	6 August	First round
4	516	São Paulo-RS	1–1	Brasil (PE)	Bento Freitas	Pelotas	12 August	First round
5	430	Pelotas	1–2	Guarani (VA)	Boca do Lobo	Pelotas	13 August	First round
6	324	Ypiranga-RS	1–0	Juventude	Colosso da Lagoa	Erechim	6 August	First round
7	196	Bagé	2–1	Santa Cruz-RS	Pedra Moura	Bagé	6 August	First round
8	127	Santa Cruz-RS	1–1	São José-RS	Estádio dos Plátanos	Santa Cruz do Sul	27 August	Second round
9	96	Santa Cruz-RS	3–1	Bagé	Estádio dos Plátanos	Santa Cruz do Sul	14 August	First round
10	82	Marau	2–0	Esportivo	Carlos Renato Bebber	Marau	20 August	Second round
