= 2006 Campeonato Gaúcho =

Campeonato Gaúcho
- Season: 2006
- Champions: Grêmio
- Runner up: Internacional
- Relegated: Farroupilha; Passo Fundo
- Copa do Brasil: Juventude; Caxias; Veranópolis
- Série C: Caxias; Brasil de Pelotas; Novo Hamburgo; Ulbra
- Matches: 158
- Goals: 452 (2.86 per match)
- Top goalscorer: Gian Carlo (Novo Hamburgo) – 14 goals
- Biggest home win: Ulbra 5-0 Passo Fundo (January 29, 2006); Veranópolis 5-0 Santa Cruz (March 5, 2006); 15 de Novembro 6-1 São Luiz (March 12, 2006)
- Biggest away win: Glória 0–4 São José-CS (February 19, 2006); São José 2-6 Internacional (March 26, 2006)
- Highest scoring: São José 2-6 Internacional (March 26, 2006)

The 86th season of the Campeonato Gaúcho kicked off on January 11, 2006 and ended on April 9, 2006. Eighteen teams participated. Holders Internacional lost to Grêmio in the finals, with the latter winning its 34th title. Farroupilha and Passo Fundo were relegated.

== Participating teams ==
Club	Home location	Previous season
15 de Novembro	Campo Bom	2nd
Brasil	Pelotas	6th
Caxias	Caxias do Sul	4th
Esportivo	Bento Gonçalves	15th
Farroupilha	Pelotas	9th
Gaúcho	Passo Fundo	2nd (Second level)
Glória	Vacaria	3rd
Grêmio	Porto Alegre	5th
Internacional	Porto Alegre	1st
Juventude	Caxias do Sul	7th
Novo Hamburgo	Novo Hamburgo	17th
Passo Fundo	Passo Fundo	10th
São José	Cachoeira do Sul	14th
São José	Porto Alegre	18th
São Luiz	Ijuí	1st (Second level)
Santa Cruz	Santa Cruz do Sul	13th
Ulbra	Canoas	12th
Veranópolis	Veranópolis	8th

== System ==
The championship would have four stages:

- First stage: The 18 teams were divided into three groups of six teams each. They played against each other inside their groups in a double round-robin system. After 10 rounds, the top two teams of each group, plus the two best third-placed teams qualified to the Semifinals.
- Copa Emílio Perondi: The ten eliminated teams were divided into 2 groups of five teams each. They played against each other inside their groups in a double round-robin system. After 10 rounds, the group winners would qualify into the Finals, with the winner qualifying to the Série C of that year, and the bottom team in each group being relegated.
- Semifinals: The eight remaining teams were divided in 2 groups of 4 teams each and they played in a double round-robin system. The winner of each group qualified to the Finals.
- Finals: Semifinals group winners played in two matches to define the Champions. The team with best overall record played the second leg at home.

== Championship ==
=== First stage ===
==== Group 1 ====
Pos	Team	Pld	W	D	L	GF	GA	GD	Pts	Qualification or relegation
1	Internacional	10	7	2	1	20	7	+13	23	Qualified to Semifinals
2	Caxias	10	5	1	4	9	10	−1	16	Qualified to Semifinals
3	Ulbra	10	4	2	4	18	13	+5	14	Qualified to Copa Emílio Perondi
4	15 de Novembro	10	4	1	5	11	11	0	13	Qualified to Copa Emílio Perondi
5	Gaúcho	10	4	1	5	12	16	−4	13	Qualified to Copa Emílio Perondi
6	Passo Fundo	10	2	1	7	13	26	−13	7	Qualified to Copa Emílio Perondi

Updated to match(es) played on February 19, 2006. Source: RSSSF.com
Rules for classification: 1) points; 2) wins; 3) goal difference; 4) number of goals scored.

==== Group 2 ====
Pos	Team	Pld	W	D	L	GF	GA	GD	Pts	Qualification or relegation
1	Grêmio	10	7	2	1	21	11	+10	23	Qualified to Semifinals
2	Santa Cruz	10	5	1	4	14	13	+1	16	Qualified to Semifinals
3	Veranópolis	10	5	0	5	16	20	−4	15	Qualified to Semifinals
4	Farroupilha	10	4	3	3	14	11	+3	15	Qualified to Copa Emílio Perondi
5	Esportivo	10	3	2	5	17	17	0	11	Qualified to Copa Emílio Perondi
6	São Luiz	10	1	2	7	8	18	−10	5	Qualified to Copa Emílio Perondi

Updated to match(es) played on February 19, 2006. Source: RSSSF.com
Rules for classification: 1) points; 2) wins; 3) goal difference; 4) number of goals scored.

==== Group 3 ====
Pos	Team	Pld	W	D	L	GF	GA	GD	Pts	Qualification or relegation
1	Juventude	10	5	3	2	17	15	+2	18	Qualified to Semifinals
2	São José de Porto Alegre	10	5	2	3	16	11	+5	17	Qualified to Semifinals
3	Novo Hamburgo	10	5	1	4	19	16	+3	16	Qualified to Semifinals
4	São José de Cachoeira do Sul	10	5	1	4	15	12	+3	16	Qualified to Copa Emílio Perondi
5	Glória	10	3	2	5	12	19	−7	11	Qualified to Copa Emílio Perondi
6	Brasil de Pelotas	10	2	1	7	13	19	−6	7	Qualified to Copa Emílio Perondi

Updated to match(es) played on February 19, 2006. Source: RSSSF.com
Rules for classification: 1) points; 2) wins; 3) goal difference; 4) number of goals scored.

=== Copa Emílio Perondi ===
==== Group 1 ====
Pos	Team	Pld	W	D	L	GF	GA	GD	Pts	Qualification or relegation
1	Ulbra	8	4	2	2	11	9	+2	14	Qualified
2	Gaúcho	8	4	0	4	10	10	0	12	
3	Glória	8	3	2	3	10	12	−2	11	
4	São José de Cachoeira do Sul	8	3	1	4	16	14	+2	10	
5	Passo Fundo	8	3	1	4	12	14	−2	10	Relegated

Updated to match(es) played on April 2, 2006. Source: RSSSF.com
Rules for classification: 1) points; 2) wins; 3) goal difference; 4) number of goals scored.

==== Group 2 ====
Pos	Team	Pld	W	D	L	GF	GA	GD	Pts	Qualification or relegation
1	15 de Novembro	8	4	2	2	12	7	+5	14	Qualified
2	Brasil de Pelotas	8	4	2	2	7	3	+4	14	
3	Esportivo	8	3	2	3	10	10	0	11	
4	São Luiz	8	3	0	5	10	19	−9	9	
5	Farroupilha	8	2	2	4	10	11	−1	8	Relegated

Updated to match(es) played on April 2, 2006. Source: RSSSF.com
Rules for classification: 1) points; 2) wins; 3) goal difference; 4) number of goals scored.

==== Finals ====
Team 1	Agg.	Team 2	1st leg	2nd leg
15 de Novembro	6–1	Ulbra	3–1	3–0

=== Semifinals ===
==== Group 1 ====
Pos	Team	Pld	W	D	L	GF	GA	GD	Pts	Qualification or relegation
1	Internacional	6	6	0	0	18	5	+13	18	Qualified to Finals
2	Caxias	6	2	2	2	9	11	−2	8	
3	Novo Hamburgo	6	1	1	4	5	8	−3	4	
4	São José de Porto Alegre	6	1	1	4	7	15	−8	4	

Updated to match(es) played on March 26, 2006. Source: RSSSF.com
Rules for classification: 1) points; 2) wins; 3) goal difference; 4) number of goals scored.

==== Group 2 ====
Pos	Team	Pld	W	D	L	GF	GA	GD	Pts	Qualification or relegation
1	Grêmio	6	4	2	0	13	6	+7	14	Qualified to Finals
2	Juventude	6	2	3	1	8	6	+2	9	
3	Veranópolis	6	1	2	3	8	8	0	5	
4	Santa Cruz	6	0	3	3	2	11	−9	3	

Updated to match(es) played on March 26, 2006. Source: RSSSF.com
Rules for classification: 1) points; 2) wins; 3) goal difference; 4) number of goals scored.

=== Finals ===
Team 1	Agg.	Team 2	1st leg	2nd leg
Grêmio	1–1 (a)	Internacional	0–0	1–1

1 April 2006
Finals

Grêmio	0 – 0	Internacional

Olímpico, Porto Alegre
Attendance: 39,110
Referee: Carlos Eugênio Simon
9 April 2006
Finals

Internacional	1 – 1	Grêmio
Fernandão 58'		Pedro Júnior 78'

Beira-Rio, Porto Alegre
Attendance: 57,451
Referee: Leandro Vuaden
