= 2014 Campeonato Gaúcho =

Campeonato Gaúcho
- Season: 2014
- Champions: Internacional
- Relegated: Esportivo; São Luiz; Pelotas
- Série D: Brasil
- Copa do Brasil: Internacional; Grêmio; Brasil
- Matches played: 122
- Goals scored: 290 (2.38 per match)
- Top goalscorer: 13 goals: Hernán Barcos (Grêmio)

The 2014 Campeonato da Primeira Divisão de Futebol Profissional da FGF (2014 FGF First Division Professional Football Championship), better known as the 2014 Campeonato Gaúcho or Gaúcho, was the 94th edition of the top flight football league of the Brazilian state of Rio Grande do Sul. The season began on 18 January and ended on 13 April.

== Format ==
The sixteen clubs were divided into two groups that played matches against clubs in their own group and the other group. The top ranking four teams from each group qualified to the play-offs. The bottom ranked three teams in the overall divisão league standings were relegated.

== Teams ==
Club	Home city	Position in 2012
Aimoré	São Leopoldo	3rd (2nd tier)
Brasil	Pelotas	1st (2nd tier)
Caxias	Caxias do Sul	8th
Cruzeiro (RS)	Cachoeirinha	11th
Esportivo	Bento Gonçalves	7th
Grêmio	Porto Alegre	4th
Internacional	Porto Alegre	1st
Juventude	Caxias do Sul	5th
Lajeadense	Lajeado	2nd
Novo Hamburgo	Novo Hamburgo	12th
Passo Fundo	Passo Fundo	6th
Pelotas	Pelotas	10th
São José	Porto Alegre	13th
São Luiz	Ijuí	3rd
São Paulo (RG)	Rio Grande	2nd (2nd tier)
Veranópolis	Veranópolis	9th

== First stage ==
=== Group A ===
Pos	Team	Pld	W	D	L	GF	GA	GD	Pts	Qualification
1	Internacional (A)	15	12	2	1	28	9	+19	38	Advances to Quarterfinals
2	Brasil (A)	15	8	5	2	18	6	+12	29	Advances to Quarterfinals
3	Veranópolis (A)	15	5	7	3	16	13	+3	22	Advances to Quarterfinals
4	Juventude (A)	15	5	5	5	16	16	0	20	Advances to Quarterfinals
5	São José (PA)	15	4	5	6	13	17	−4	17	
6	Aimoré	15	4	5	6	17	23	−6	17	
7	Lajeadense	15	4	4	7	14	15	−1	16	
8	Esportivo	15	4	4	7	16	24	−8	16	

Source: Globo Esporte
Rules for classification: 1st points; 2nd wins; 3rd goal difference; 4th goals scored; 5th red cards received; 6th yellow cards received; 7th public draw
(A) Advance to a further round

=== Group B ===
Pos	Team	Pld	W	D	L	GF	GA	GD	Pts	Qualification
1	Grêmio (A)	15	8	5	2	28	13	+15	29	Advances to Quarterfinals
2	Caxias (A)	15	8	3	4	23	16	+7	27	Advances to Quarterfinals
3	Novo Hamburgo (A)	15	6	2	7	16	18	−2	20	Advances to Quarterfinals
4	Cruzeiro-RS (A)	15	4	7	4	17	22	−5	19	Advances to Quarterfinals
5	São Paulo (RG)	15	4	5	6	17	20	−3	17	
6	Passo Fundo	15	5	4	6	19	22	−3	19	
7	São Luiz	15	2	5	8	13	21	−8	11	
8	Pelotas	15	2	2	11	12	28	−16	8	

Source: Globo Esporte
Rules for classification: 1st points; 2nd wins; 3rd goal difference; 4th goals scored; 5th red cards received; 6th yellow cards received; 7th public draw
(A) Advance to a further round

=== Playoffs ===
Quarter-finals
B1	Internacional	3
A4	Cruzeiro-RS	1
A2	Caxias	2 (9)
B3	Veranópolis	2 (8)
B2	Brasil	2
A3	Novo Hamburgo	0
A1	Grêmio	3
B4	Juventude	0

Semi-finals
B1	Internacional	3
A2	Caxias	0
A1	Grêmio	2
B2	Brasil	1

Final
B1	Internacional	2	4	6
A1	Grêmio	1	1	2

== Tournament finals ==
Internacional won title with 6-2 aggregate.

== Overall table ==
The overall table considers only the matches played during the first stage and will define the three teams that will be relegated to play lower levels in 2015. The Taça Champions are placed on the top of the table. The best placed team not playing in Campeonato Brasileiro Série A (Grêmio, Internacional), B or C (Caxias, Juventude) will be "promoted" to 2014 Campeonato Brasileiro Série D. The best three teams will qualify for 2014 Copa do Brasil.

Pos	Team	Pld	W	D	L	GF	GA	GD	Pts	Qualification or relegation
1	Internacional (C)	15	12	2	1	28	9	+19	38	2014 Copa do Brasil
2	Grêmio	15	8	5	2	28	13	+15	29	2014 Copa do Brasil
3	Brasil	15	8	5	2	18	6	+12	29	2014 Copa do Brasil and Série D
4	Caxias	15	8	3	4	23	16	+7	27	
5	Veranópolis	15	5	7	3	16	13	+3	22	
6	Novo Hamburgo	15	6	2	7	16	18	−2	20	
7	Juventude	15	5	5	5	16	16	0	20	
8	Cruzeiro-RS	15	4	7	4	17	22	−5	19	
9	São Paulo (RG)	15	4	5	6	17	20	−3	17	
10	São José (PA)	15	4	5	6	13	17	−4	17	
11	Aimoré	15	4	5	6	17	23	−6	17	
12	Lajeadense	15	4	4	7	14	15	−1	16	
13	Passo Fundo	15	5	4	6	19	22	−3	11 (Note: Passo Fundo were deducted 8 points because the use of an irregular player)	
14	São Luiz (R)	15	2	5	8	13	21	−8	11	Relegation to 2015 Divisão de Acesso
15	Pelotas (R)	15	2	2	11	12	28	−16	8	Relegation to 2015 Divisão de Acesso
16	Esportivo (R)	15	4	4	7	16	24	−8	7 (Note: Esportivo were deducted a total 9 points because a racist episode of them fans against referee Márcio Chagas da Silva)	Relegation to 2015 Divisão de Acesso

Rules for classification: 1st points; 2nd wins; 3rd goal difference; 4th goals scored; 5th red cards received; 6th yellow cards received; 7th public draw
(C) Champions; (R) Relegated

== See also ==
- 2014 Copa FGF
