= Paulo Henrique Marques =

Brazilian football manager

Personal information
- Full name: Paulo Henrique Marques
- Date of birth: 18 March 1965 (age 61)
- Place of birth: Santa Rosa, Brazil
- Position: Left back

Team information
- Current team: São Luiz (head coach)

Senior career*
Years	Team	Apps	(Gls)
1985–1988	São Borja		
1989–1990	Dínamo-RS		
1990	Oriental-RS		
1991–1993	Dínamo-RS		
1994	São José de Cachoeira		
1994	Dínamo-RS		
1995–1996	Santo Ângelo		
1997	Palmeirense		

Managerial career
- 1999: Santo Ângelo U20
- 2002: Santo Ângelo
- 2002: Bagé
- 2006: Veranópolis
- 2007–2008: Ulbra
- Passo Fundo
- Santa Cruz-RS
- Bagé
- 2009: Guarany de Bagé
- 2009: Santo Ângelo
- 2010: Guarany de Camaquã
- 2010: Avenida
- 2010: Guarany de Camaquã
- 2011: Esportivo
- 2012: Juventus-RS
- 2012: Tupy-RS
- 2013: Guarany de Camaquã
- 2013: Tupy-RS
- 2014: Palmeirense
- 2014: Veranópolis
- 2015: Veranópolis U20
- 2015: Inter-SM U20
- 2016: Tupy-RS
- 2017–2018: São Luiz-RS
- 2018: Novo Hamburgo
- 2019: São Luiz-RS
- 2019: Caxias
- 2020: Ypiranga-RS
- 2020–2022: São Luiz-RS
- 2022: São José-RS
- 2022: Novo Hamburgo
- 2023: Manaus
- 2023: Veranópolis
- 2024: Santa Cruz-RS
- 2024: Veranópolis
- 2025: Aimoré
- 2026–: São Luiz
- * Club domestic league appearances and goals

Paulo Henrique Marques (born 18 March 1965) is a Brazilian football coach and former player who played as a left back. He is the current head coach of São Luiz.

Marques spent his entire playing and managerial career in the state of Rio Grande do Sul, and also coached mainly in that state.

== Playing career ==
Marques was born in Santa Rosa, Rio Grande do Sul, and started his career with São Borja in 1985. He never left his home state during his entire career, representing Dínamo (three spells), Oriental, São José de Cachoeira do Sul, Santo Ângelo and Palmeirense, retiring in 1997.

== Managerial career ==
Marques started his managerial career with former club Santo Ângelo in 1999, being in charge of the under-20 squad. After being in charge of another clubs' youth teams, he returned to Santo Ângelo in 2002, being appointed first-team manager and achieving an impressive fifth position in the year's Campeonato Gaúcho.

Marques then worked with Bagé in the remainder of the 2002 season, and later joined Ulbra as a football coordinator. In October 2007, he replaced sacked Paulo Porto as manager of the latter team, but was dismissed the following March.

Marques then went on to work at Passo Fundo, Santa Cruz-RS and Guarany de Bagé before returning to Santo Ângelo in 2009, where he replaced Mazarópi. He later took charge of Guarany de Camaquã, Avenida, and then returned to Guarany de Camaquã before being appointed manager of Esportivo for the 2011 season in November 2010.

Sacked in March 2011, Marques subsequently managed hometown side Juventus and Tupy, before returning to Guarany de Camaquã for the 2013 season. He later returned to Tupy, where he won the 2013 Campeonato Gaúcho Série B with the club.

Marques was named manager of Palmeirense for the 2014 campaign, but later moved back to former side Veranópolis. In February 2015, he was appointed manager of Inter de Santa Maria's under-20s, but returned to Tupy for the 2016 season.

On 19 August 2016, Marques was appointed São Luiz manager for the 2017 campaign. He achieved immediate promotion to Campeonato Gaúcho as champions, and managed to avoid relegation in the following year. In March 2018, he was named manager of Novo Hamburgo for the year's Série D, but agreed to return to São Luiz in July, achieving an impressive fourth position with the latter in the 2019 Campeonato Gaúcho.

On 29 June 2019, Marques was announced as manager of Caxias, but left the club in July after the club was knocked out of the Série D. On 30 September, he agreed to a deal with Ypiranga to become the club's manager for the ensuing campaign.

Marques resigned on 20 November 2020, and subsequently returned to São Luiz the following day. On 15 March 2022, he replaced Paulo Baier at the helm of São José-RS, but was sacked on 15 August, after the club's elimination in the 2022 Série C.

Marques worked for a brief period at Novo Hamburgo before being named in charge of fellow third division side Manaus on 19 October 2022. On 24 February 2023, after being knocked out of the 2023 Copa Verde, he resigned.

== Honours ==
Tupy-RS

- Campeonato Gaúcho Série B: 2013

São Luiz-RS

- Campeonato Gaúcho Série A2: 2017
