= Paulo Porto (football manager) =

Brazilian football manager (born 1951)

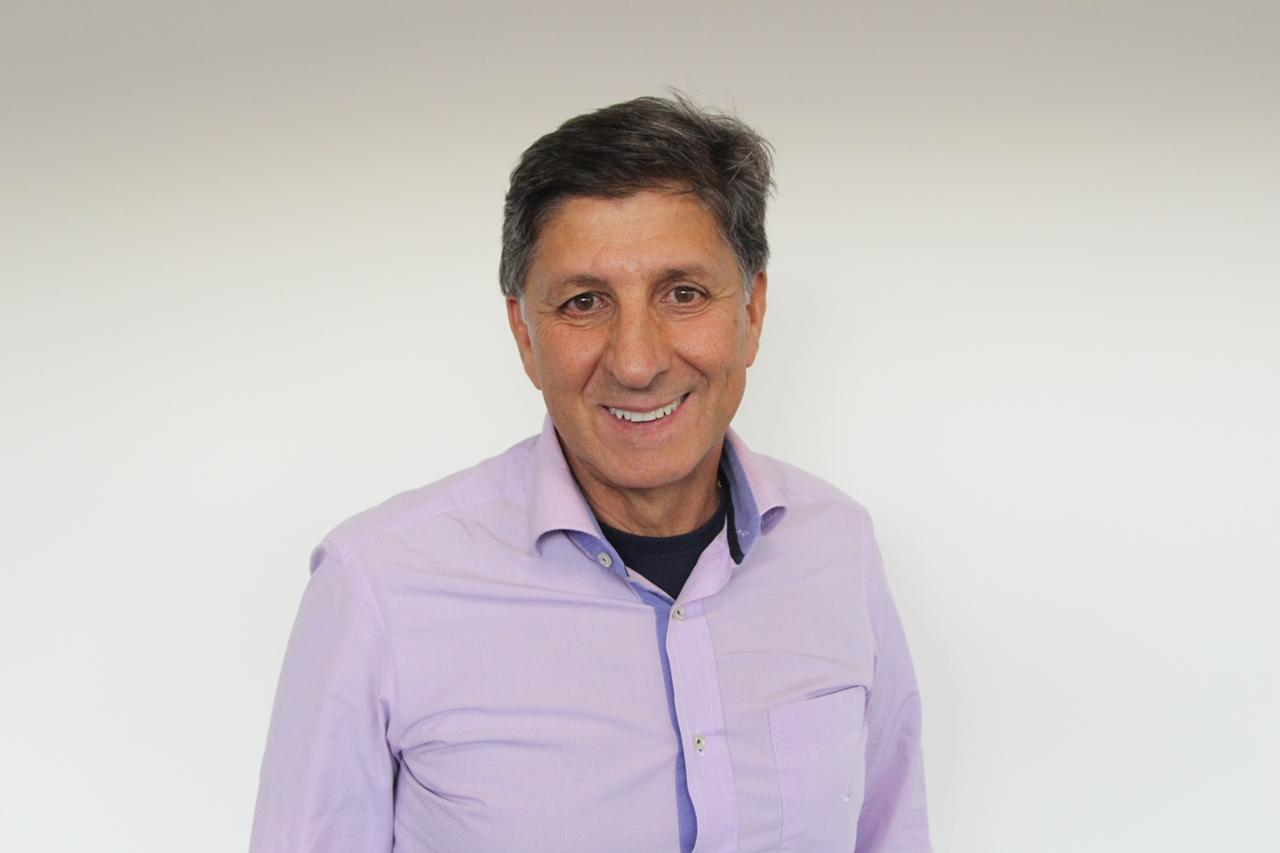

Personal information
- Full name: Paulo Francisco da Silva Porto
- Date of birth: 27 September 1951 (age 75)
- Place of birth: Taquari, Brazil

Team information
- Current team: Inter de Lages

Managerial career
- Years: Team
- 1998: Pinheiros-RS
- 1999: Taquariense
- 2000–2001: Glória
- 2001–2002: Guarani de Venâncio Aires
- 2002: São José de Cachoeira do Sul
- 2002: Clube Atlético Lages
- 2003: Marcílio Dias
- 2004: São José de Cachoeira do Sul
- 2004: Clube Atlético Lages
- 2004–2005: Esportivo
- 2005: Juventude-B
- 2006: Brasil de Pelotas
- 2007: Veranópolis
- 2007: Ulbra
- 2007: Caxias
- 2008: Inter de Santa Maria
- 2009: Metropolitano
- 2009: Esportivo
- 2010: Brasil de Pelotas
- 2011: Glória
- 2011: Santa Cruz-RS
- 2012: São Luiz
- 2012: Caxias
- 2012: Brasil de Farroupilha
- 2012: Novo Hamburgo
- 2013: São Luiz
- 2013: ABC
- 2013–2014: Pelotas
- 2014–2015: Aimoré
- 2015: Inter de Santa Maria
- 2015: Pelotas
- 2016: Atlético-PE
- 2016–2017: Passo Fundo
- 2018: Pelotas
- 2019: Passo Fundo
- 2019–: Inter de Lages

Paulo Francisco da Silva Porto known as Paulo Porto (born 27 September 1951 in Taquari) is a Brazilian professional football manager.

== Honours ==
Esportivo

- Copa FGF: 2004

Veranópolis

- Campeonato Gaúcho do Interior: 2007

Inter de Santa Maria

- Campeonato Gaúcho do Interior: 2008

Caxias

- Taça Piratini: 2012

Pelotas

- Copa Sul Fronteira: 2013
- Super Copa Gaúcha: 2013
- Recopa Gaúcha: 2014
