= Sociedade Esportiva e Recreativa Caxias do Sul =

Brazilian association football club based in Caxias do Sul, Rio Grande do Sul, Brazil

Caxias
- Full name: Sociedade Esportiva e Recreativa Caxias do Sul
- Nicknames: Grená da Serra (Garnet of the Serra); Grená do Povo (People's Garnet); Falcão Grená (Garnet Falcon)
- Founded: 10 April 1935; 91 years ago
- Ground: Estádio Centenário
- Capacity: 22,132
- President: Mário Werlang
- Head coach: Júnior Rocha
- League: Campeonato Brasileiro Série C Campeonato Gaúcho
- 2025 2025: Série C, 5th of 20; Gaúcho, 4th of 12
- Website: www.sercaxias.com.br
Home colors	Away colors	Third colors

Sociedade Esportiva e Recreativa Caxias do Sul, commonly known as Caxias, is a Brazilian professional association football club based in Caxias do Sul, Rio Grande do Sul. The team plays in Série C, the third tier of the Brazilian football league system, as well as in the Gauchão Série A, the top tier of the Rio Grande do Sul state football league.

Caxias won the Campeonato Gaúcho – Rio Grande do Sul State Championship in 2000.

Its fiercest rival is Juventude, the other club based in Caxias do Sul. The local derby is known as Ca-Ju. As of 2024, the Grená is ranked as the 74th best team in Brazil, according to the Brazilian Football Confederation Ranking.

== History ==
Caxias was founded on 10 April 1935, as Grêmio Esportivo Flamengo (commonly referred at the time as Flamengo de Caxias, to not confuse with the more famous homonymous Rio de Janeiro club), which had been a fusion of two other teams (Ruy Barbosa and Rio Branco). However the club, as well as Juventude folded due to a financial crisis in the 1960s. Both teams merged into Associação Caxias de Futebol on 14 December 1971. The new club wore garnet, white and blue of Grêmio Esportivo Flamengo. In 1972, Associação Caxias de Futebol and Grêmio played the first game on color TV in Brazil. The game finished 0–0. However, Juventude split off and reestablished itself in 1975, and Grêmio Esportivo Flamengo adopted the name Sociedade Esportiva e Recreativa Caxias do Sul.

Caxias played its first Brasileirão campaign at the 1976 Campeonato Brasileiro. They were the first club in Rio Grande do Sul from outside the state capital of Porto Alegre to participate in the national championship. The club's best performance in the national league was finishing in 10th at the 1978 Campeonato Brasileiro.

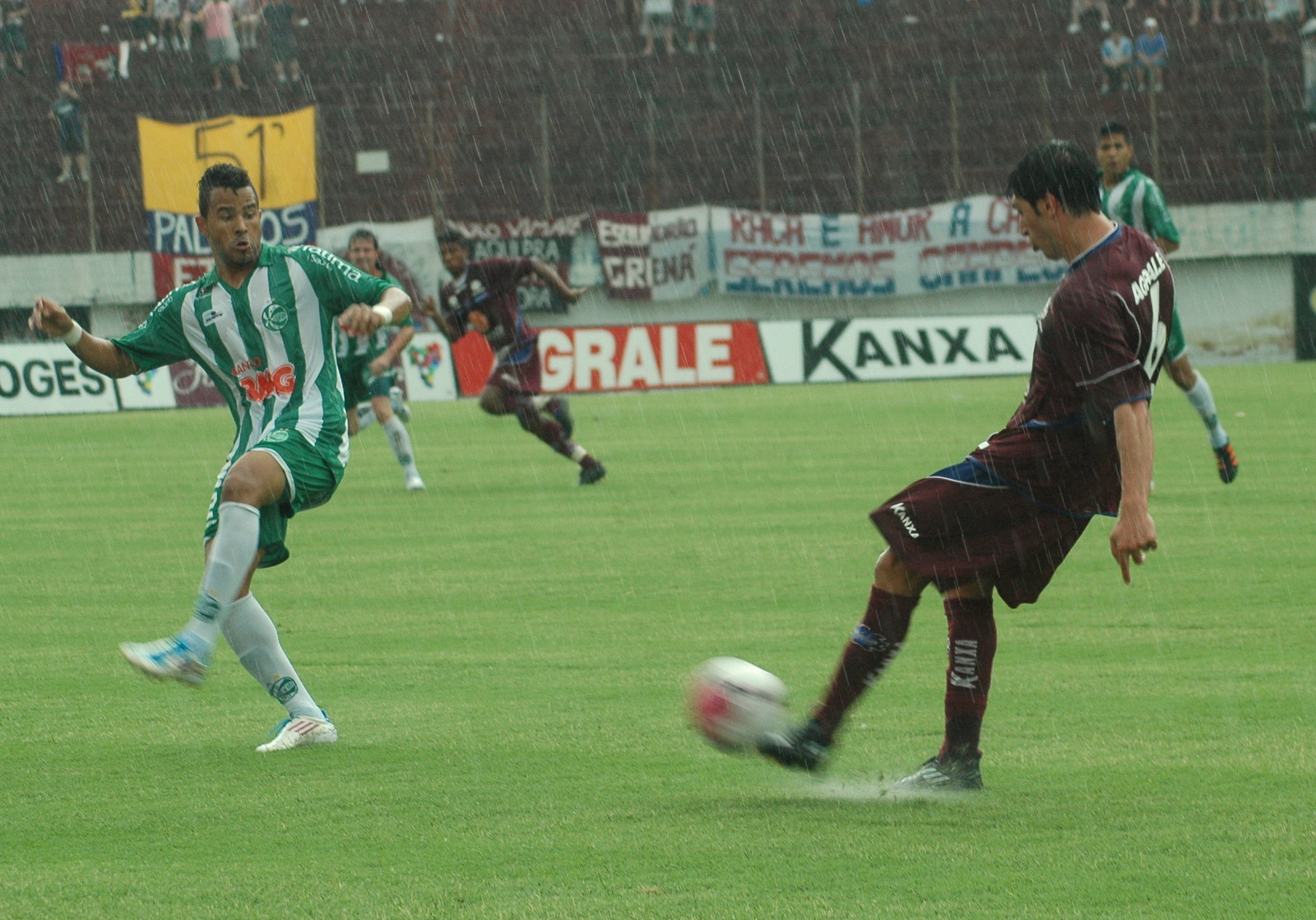
A Ca-Ju derby (Caxias vs Juventude) match in 2012

The club's greatest feat was the 2000 Campeonato Gaúcho title. Under Tite's leadership, the club was able to qualify for the finals, reaching ahead of traditional Rio Grande do Sul powerhouse and frequent finalist Internacional, where they defeated a Grêmio with Ronaldinho 3–0 at Estádio Centenário. At the away game in Grêmio's home at the Olímpico Monumental, Caxias tied the game 0–0 and was able to secure the title, the first of its history. This was a remarkable underdog victory, as the title has been won by the Grenal duo since 1954, with only Caxias' rivals Juventude having conquered the title in 1998. This successful campaign also helped launch Tite's career, at the time an unknown manager.

Caxias was a frequent mainstay of the Campeonato Brasileiro Série C, however, after begin relegated in both the Campeonato Gaúcho (to the Campeonato Gaúcho Divisão de Acesso) and the national Série C in 2015. After returning to the first state division in 2017, Caxias started its campaign at the Campeonato Brasileiro Série D. While having good results at the Campeonato Gaúcho, including being runner-ups in 2020, Caxias failed to translate this into success in national competitions. In the years 2018, 2019, 2021 and 2022, Caxias failed to get promoted, getting eliminated in the quarter-finals losing its promotion spot to Treze, Manaus, ABC and América-RN, respectively, wasting another chance to gain promotion. In 2023, Caxias started the year being the runner-ups of the Campeonato Gaúcho, and were promoted back to Série C after defeating Portuguesa-RJ in the quarter-finals, but failed to win the championship after getting eliminated by Ferroviário in the semi-finals.

== Anthem ==
- Written by: Dirceu Antônio Soares
- Music by: Antônio Messias and Dirceu Antônio Soares

== Stadium ==
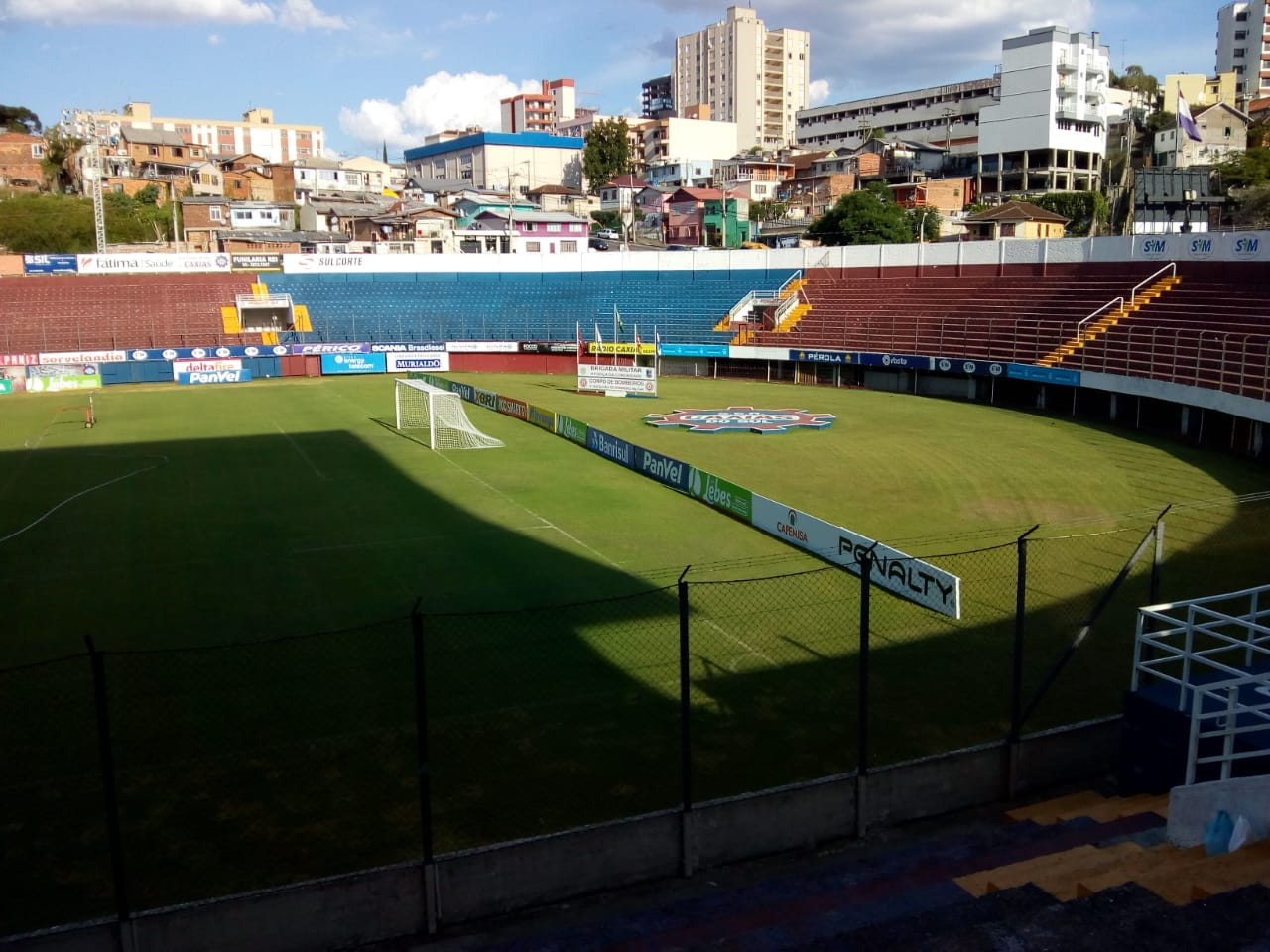
Estádio Francisco Stédile, more commonly known as the Estádio Centenário, in 2019

Caxias' stadium is Estádio Centenário, inaugurated in 1976, with a maximum capacity of 30,802 people.

== Rivalry ==
Caxias' biggest rival is Juventude, their derby is named "Ca-Ju". The other rival of Caxias is Esportivo of Bento Gonçalves, whose derby is named "Clássico da Polenta" (The Polenta derby).

== Players ==
=== Current squad ===
As of 30 July 2026

Note: Flags indicate national team as defined under FIFA eligibility rules; some limited exceptions apply. Players may hold more than one non-FIFA nationality.

No.	Pos.	Nation	Player
1	GK	BRA	Marcelo Dal Soler
2	DF	BRA	Vitor Gabriel (on loan from Athletic Club-U20)
3	DF	BRA	Ianson
4	DF	BRA	Mancha (on loan from Cianorte)
5	MF	BRA	Breno Santos (on loan from Joinville)
6	DF	BRA	Roberto
7	FW	BRA	Dentinho
8	MF	BRA	Marcelo Freitas (on loan from Portuguesa)
9	FW	BRA	Diego Quirino
10	MF	BRA	Matheus Anjos (on loan from Primavera)
11	FW	BRA	Vitor Feijão
12	GK	BRA	Gabriel Toebe
13	DF	BRA	Windson

No.	Pos.	Nation	Player
14	DF	BRA	Maurício
15	MF	BRA	Grígor (on loan from Rio Branco)
16	FW	BRA	Gaspar (on loan from Avaí)
17	DF	BRA	Felipe Albuquerque
18	FW	BRA	Salatiel
19	FW	BRA	Jhonatan Ribeiro
20	MF	BRA	Ravanelli (on loan from Capivariano)
21	FW	BRA	Calyson
22	MF	BRA	Matheus Nunes
23	DF	BRA	André (on loan from Operário)
24	DF	BRA	Vitinho
25	FW	BRA	João Lucas (on loan from Vila Nova)

== Managers ==
- (Brazil) Levir Culpi (1986)
- (Brazil) Ivo Wortmann (1987)
- (Brazil) Tite (1991–1992)
- (Brazil) Celso Roth (1996)
- (Brazil) Tite (1999–2000)
- (Brazil) Edson Gaúcho (2001)
- (Brazil) Roberto Cavalo (2002)
- (Brazil) Abel Ribeiro (2002)
- (Brazil) Péricles Chamusca (2003)
- (Brazil) Tita (2004)
- (Brazil) Juninho Fonseca (2004)
- (Brazil) Mano Menezes (2004–2005)
- (Brazil) Leandro Machado (2007)
- (Brazil) Gilson Kleina (2007)
- (Brazil) Adilson Fernandes (2008–2009)
- (Brazil) Renê Weber (2009)
- (Brazil) Argel Fucks (2009)
- (Brazil) Gilmar Iser (2009)
- (Brazil) Círio Quadros (2009)
- (Brazil) Julinho Camargo (2010)
- (Brazil) Ricardo Drubscky (2010)
- (Brazil) Lisca (2010–2011)
- (Brazil) Guilherme Macuglia (2011)
- (Brazil) Argel Fucks (2011)
- (Brazil) Luiz Carlos Ferreira (2011)
- (Brazil) Paulo Porto (2012)
- (Brazil) Mauro Ovelha (2012)
- (Brazil) Picoli (2012–2014)
- (Brazil) Beto Campos (2014)
- (Brazil) Itamar Schülle (2014)
- (Brazil) Paulo Turra (2014–2015)
- (Brazil) Hélio dos Anjos (2015)
- (Brazil) Luís Antônio Zaluar (2015)
- (Brazil) Marcelo Vilar (2015)
- (Brazil) Beto Campos (2015–2016)
- (Brazil) Luiz Carlos Winck (2016–2017)
- (Brazil) Luiz Carlos Winck (2018)
- (Brazil) Pingo (2019)
- (Brazil) Paulo Henrique Marques (2019)
- (Brazil) Rafael Lacerda (2019–2021)
- (Brazil) Rogério Zimmermann (2022)
- (Brazil) Luan Carlos (2022)
- (Brazil) Thiago Carvalho (2022–2023)
- (Brazil) Tcheco (2023)
- (Brazil) Gerson Gusmão (2023–2024)
- (Brazil) Argel Fucks (2024)
- (Brazil) Thiago Gomes (2024)
- (Brazil) Luizinho Vieira (2025–)

== Honours ==
=== Official tournaments ===
State
Competitions	Titles	Seasons
Campeonato Gaúcho	1	2000
Copa FGF	1	2007
Campeonato Gaúcho Série A2	2	1953, 2016

=== Others tournaments ===
==== State ====
- Copa Serrana (1): 2016
- Campeonato do Interior Gaúcho (13): 1969, 1973, 1975, 1977, 1978, 1985, 1989, 1990, 2000, 2010, 2017, 2019, 2024
- Taça Piratini (1): 2012
- Taça Cel. Ewaldo Poeta (1): 2020

==== State Regional ====
- Copa Larry Pinto de Faria (1): 2016
- Copa Ênio Andrade (1): 1998
- Copa Daltro Menezes (1): 1996
- Campeonato Metropolitano de Porto Alegre (1): 1960

==== City ====
- Campeonato Citadino de Caxias do Sul (6): 1937, 1942, 1947, 1948, 1951, 1953

=== Runners-up ===
- Recopa Sul-Brasileira (1): 2007
- Campeonato Gaúcho (4): 1990, 2012, 2020, 2023
- Copa Governador do Estado (4): 1971, 1972, 1973, 1975

=== Awards ===
- Fita Azul (1): 1962

Fita Azul do Futebol Brasileiro (Brazilian Football Blue Ribbon) was an award given for the club which succeeds in an excursion out of the country.
