= Sociedade Esportiva e Recreativa Panambi =

Panambi
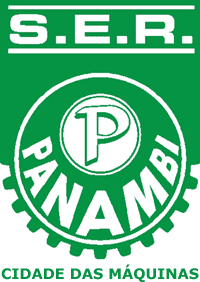
- Full name: Sociedade Esportiva Recreativa Panambi
- Nickname: Verde-branca do Vale
- Founded: January 1, 2004 (22 years ago)
- Ground: Complexo Esportivo Piratini, Panambi, Rio Grande do Sul state, Brazil
- Capacity: 3,000
- President: Nélson Feidein
- Head coach: Lúcio Collet
Home colors	Away colors

Sociedade Esportiva Recreativa Panambi, commonly known as Panambi, is a Brazilian football club based in Panambi, Rio Grande do Sul state.

== History ==
The club was founded on January 1, 2004. The club competed several times in the Campeonato Gaúcho Second Level, and reached the Semifinal Stage of the competition in 2009.

== Stadium ==
Sociedade Esportiva Recreativa Panambi play their home games at Estádio Municipal João Marimon Júnior, commonly known as Complexo Esportivo Piratini. The stadium has a maximum capacity of 3,000 people.
