= Associação Garibaldi de Esportes =

Garibaldi
- Full name: Associação Garibaldi de Esportes
- Founded: August 18, 1998
- Ground: Estádio Alcides Santa Rosa, Garibaldi, Rio Grande do Sul, Rio Grande do Sul state, Brazil
- Capacity: 5,000
Home colors	Away colors	Third colors

Associação Garibaldi de Esportes, commonly known as Garibaldi, is a Brazilian football club based in Garibaldi, Rio Grande do Sul state.

== History ==
The club was founded on August 18, 1998, as Guarany, but was eventually renamed to Associação Garibaldi de Esportes. They competed for the first time in a professional competition in 2004, when they were eliminated in the Second Stage in the Campeonato Gaúcho Second Level.

== Stadium ==
Associação Garibaldi de Esportes play their home games at Estádio Alcides Santa Rosa. The stadium has a maximum capacity of 5,000 people.
