= Estádio Parque Esportivo Montanha dos Vinhedos =

Stadium

Coordinates: 29°09′14″S 51°32′11″W

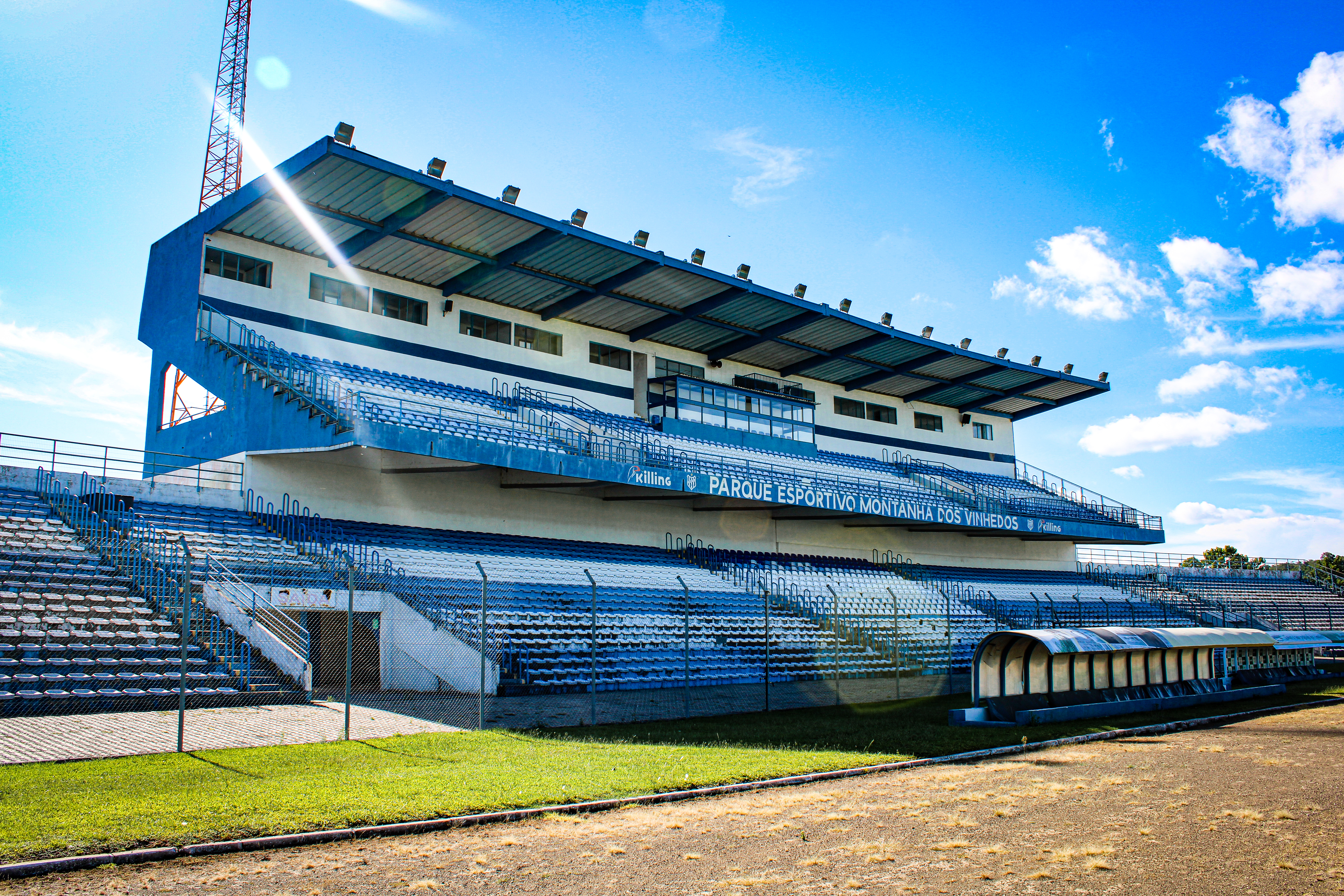
- Interactive map of Estádio Parque Esportivo Montanha dos Vinhedos
- Full name: Estádio Parque Esportivo Montanha dos Vinhedos
- Location: Bento Gonçalves, Rio Grande do Sul, Brazil
- Capacity: 15,269
- Surface: Grass

Construction
- Groundbreaking: 1983
- Opened: February 29, 2004

Tenant
- Clube Esportivo Bento Gonçalves

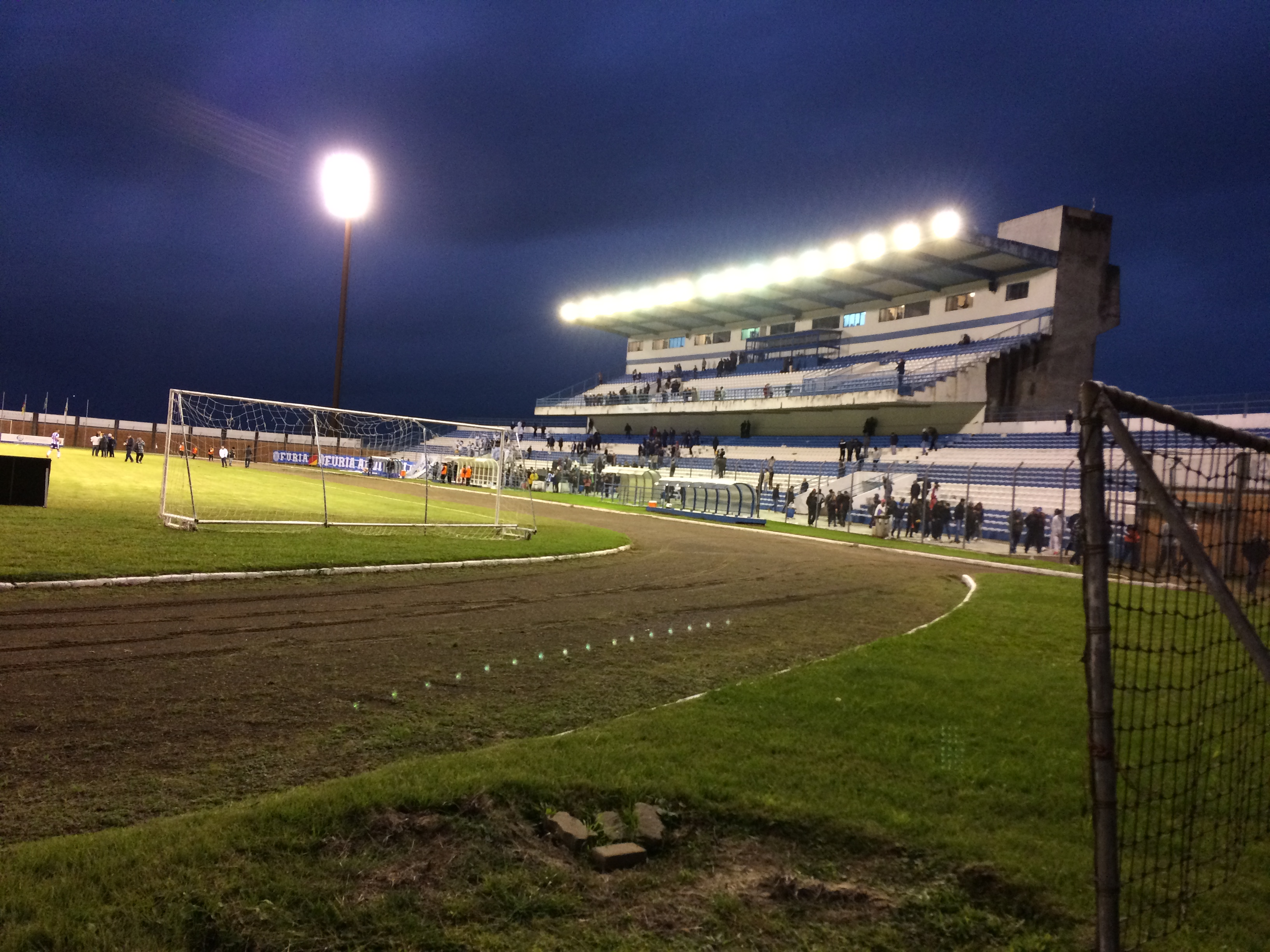
Parque Esportivo Montanha dos Vinhedos.jpg

Estádio Parque Esportivo Montanha dos Vinhedos is a stadium in Bento Gonçalves, Brazil. It has a capacity of 15,269 spectators. It is the home ground of Clube Esportivo Bento Gonçalves of the Campeonato Brasileiro Série B.
