= Marau =

Municipality in Rio Grande do Sul, Brazil

Coordinates: 28°26′56″S 52°12′00″W

- Municipality
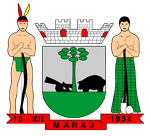
- Flag Coat of arms
- Interactive map of Marau
- Country: Brazil
- Time zone: UTC−3 (BRT)

Marau is a municipality in the state of Rio Grande do Sul, Brazil. It was initially populated by Italian immigrants that were escaping from the war.

The city name is based on the brave native chief "cacique Marau" which fought against the white people to keep the land. He lost the battle in 1840 and it generated a river called Mortandande after the bloody battle.

The economy is based on agriculture and industry.

== General ==
Area: 649.7 km²

Population: 44,858 (2020)

Time zone: UTC−3

== See also ==
- List of municipalities in Rio Grande do Sul
