= Panambi =

Municipality in Rio Grande do Sul, Brazil

Coordinates: 28°17′34″S 53°30′07″W

- Municipality
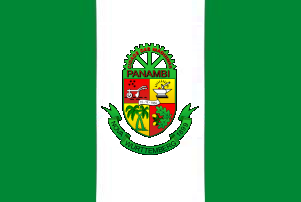
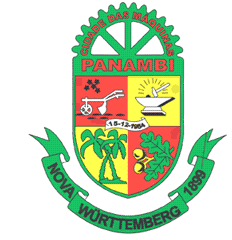
- Flag Coat of arms
- Interactive map of Panambi
- Country: Brazil
- Time zone: UTC−3 (BRT)

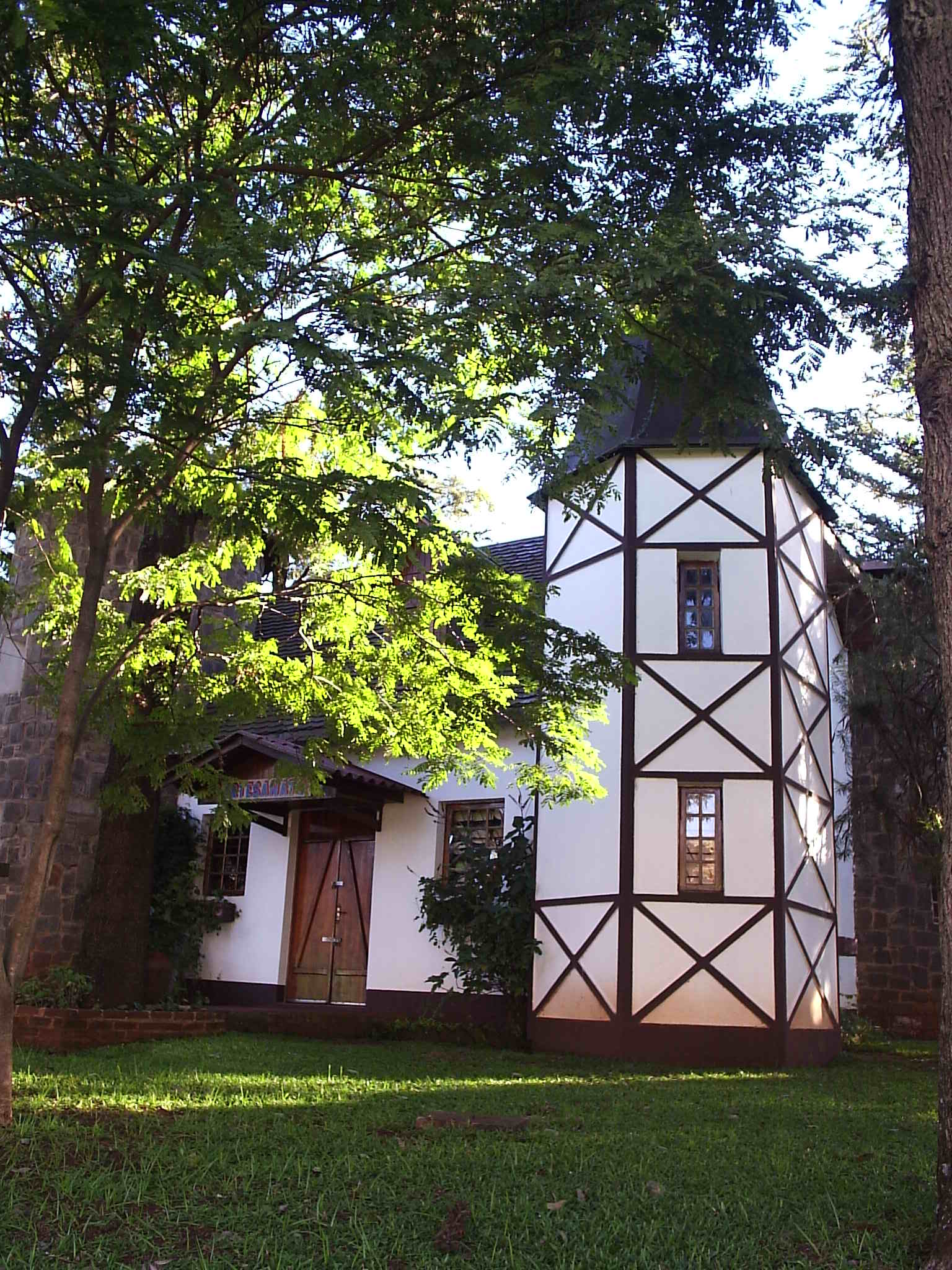
Kaufhaus, a craft exhibition building, Panambi, Rio Grande do Sul, Brazil

Panambi is a municipality in the state of Rio Grande do Sul, Brazil. As of 2020, the estimated population was 44,128.

== See also ==
- List of municipalities in Rio Grande do Sul
