= Garibaldi, Rio Grande do Sul =

Municipality in Rio Grande do Sul, Brazil

Garibaldi
- Municipality
- Municipality of Garibaldi
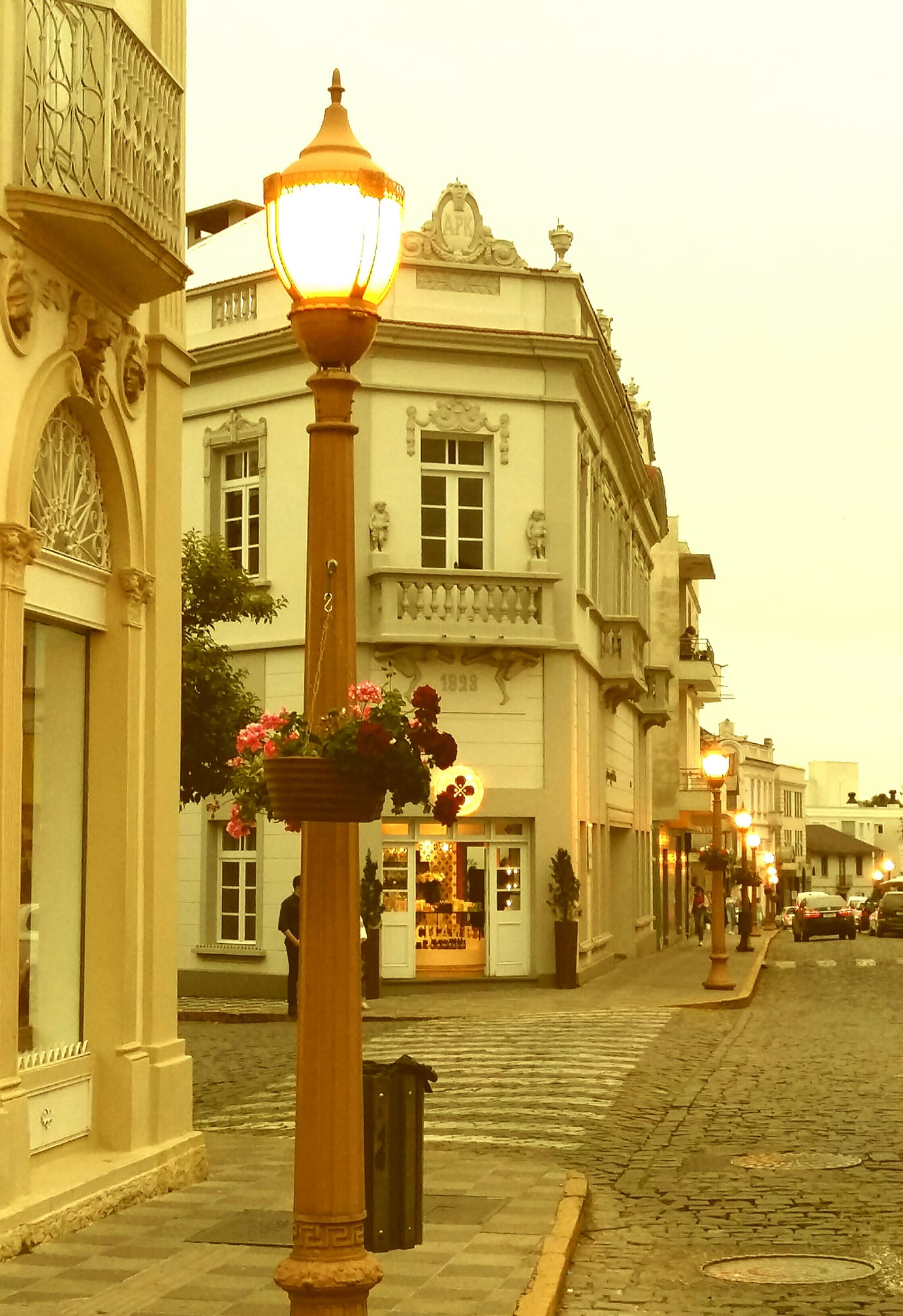
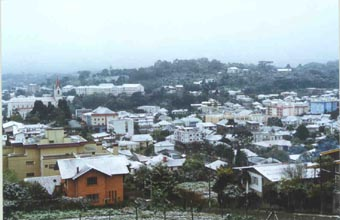
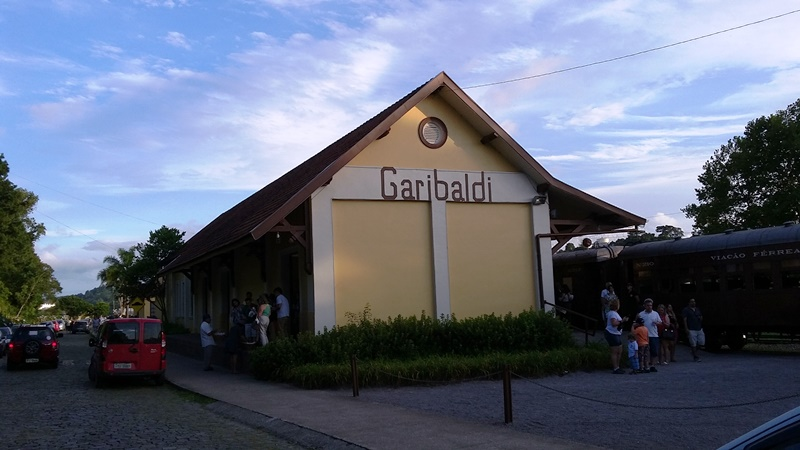
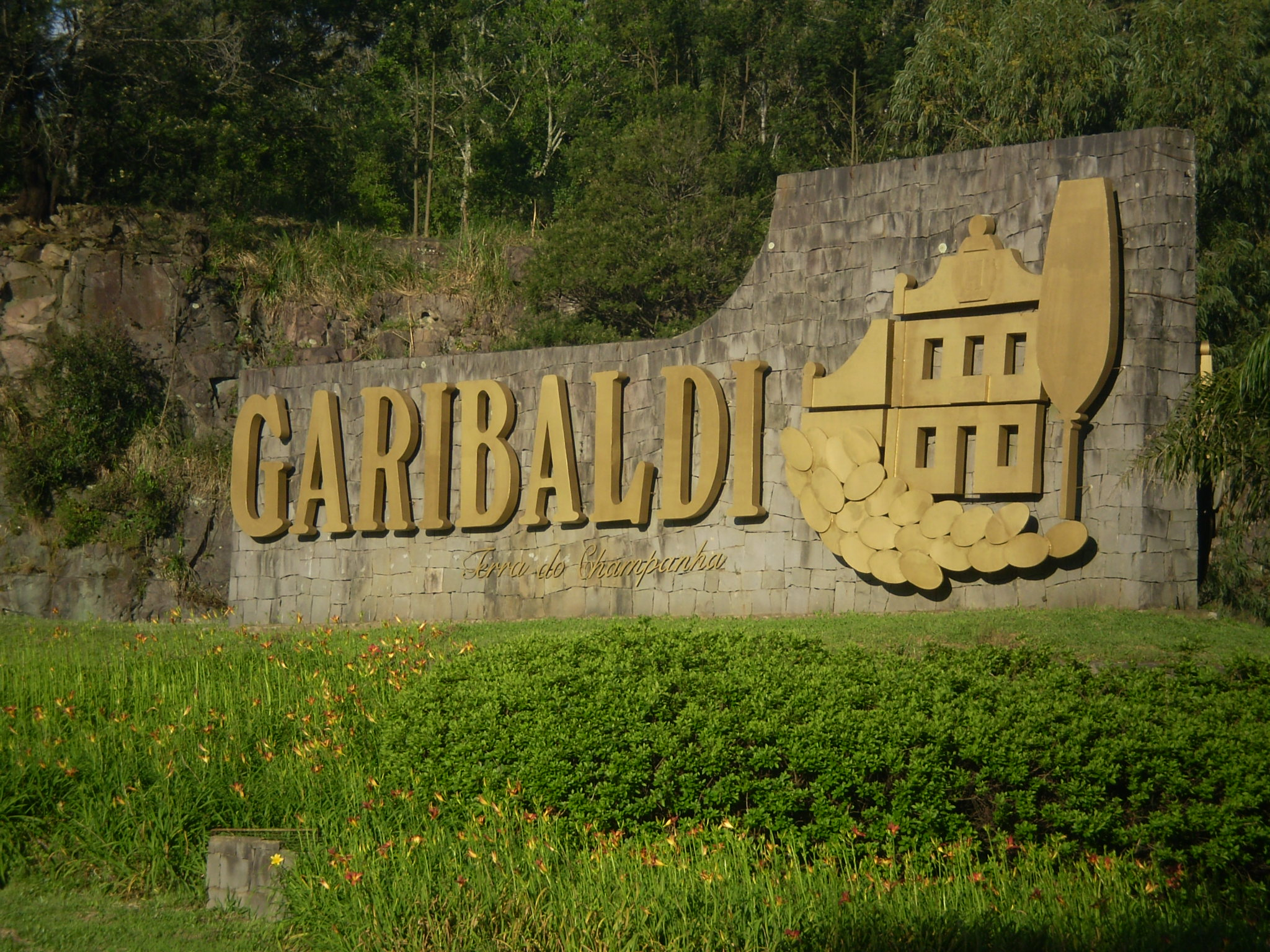
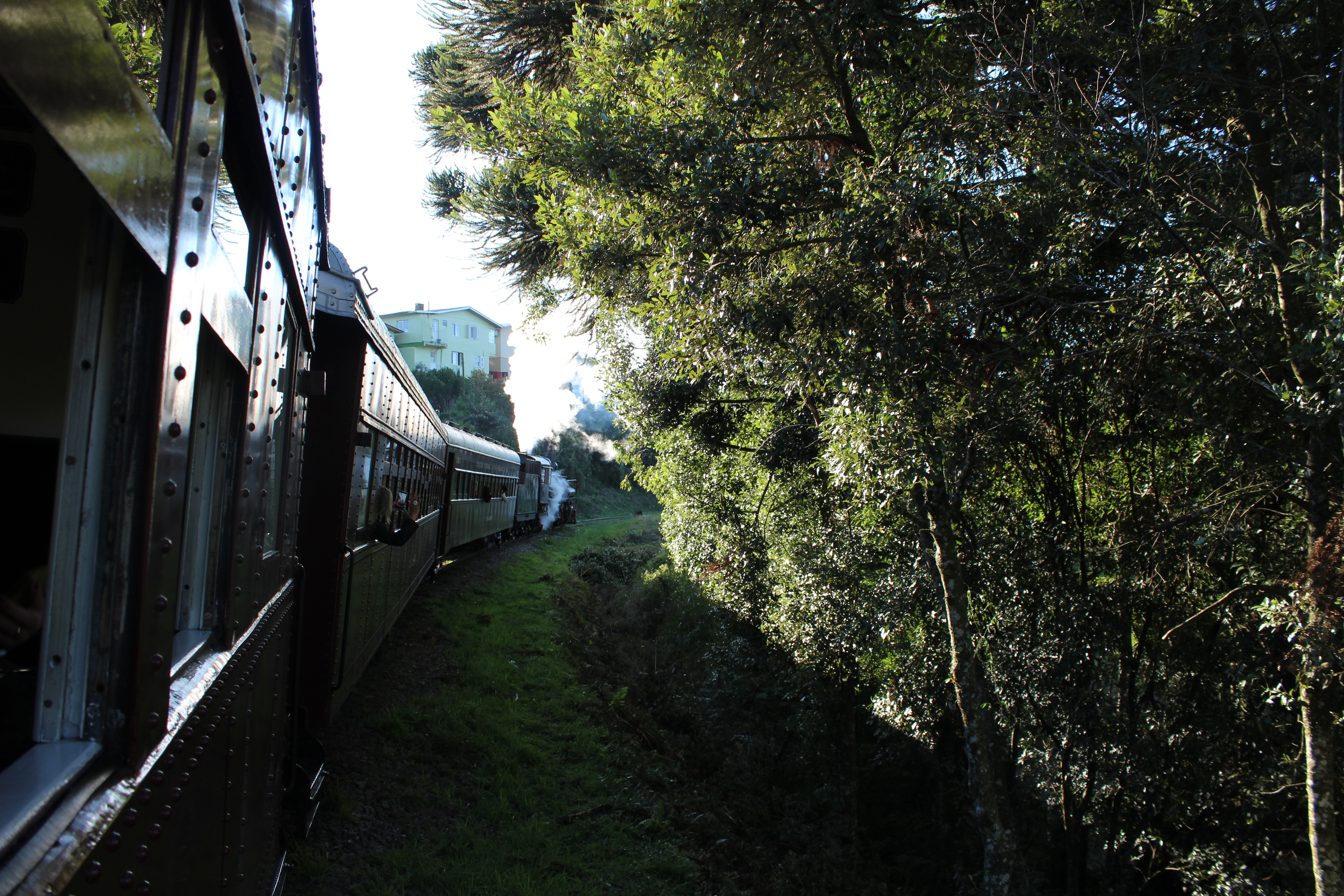
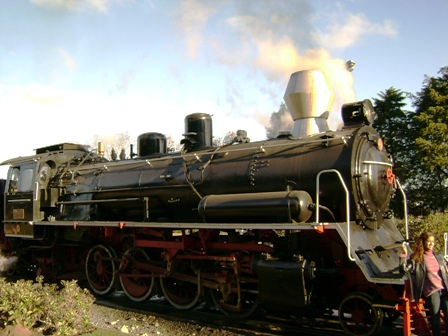
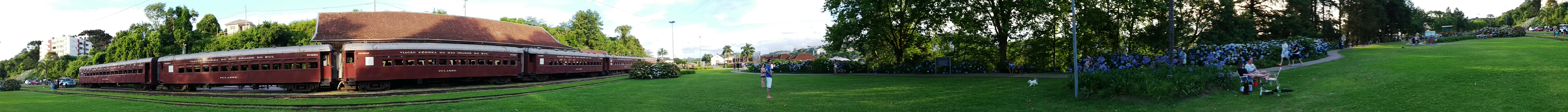

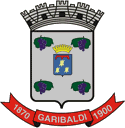
- Flag Coat of arms

- Location in the State of Rio Grande do sul

- Coordinates: 29°17′20″S 51°33′51″W
- Country: Brazil
- Region: South
- State: Rio Grande do Sul
- Founded: October 31, 1900

Government
  - Mayor: Cirano Cisilotto (PT) (2009-2012)

Area
  - Total: 169.7 km^{2} (65.5 sq mi)
- Elevation: 613 m (2,011 ft)

Population (2020)
  - Total: 35,440
- Time zone: UTC−3 (BRT)
- HDI (2010): 0.786 – high
- Website: www.garibaldi.rs.gov.br

Garibaldi is a municipality in Rio Grande do Sul, southern Brazil. It has a population of 35,440 people, most of them of Italian descent. The city is famous for its wine and sparkling wine productions. The name Garibaldi is a homage to the Italian revolutionary Giuseppe Garibaldi and his Brazilian wife, Anita Garibaldi. It was settled by Italian immigrants, predominantly Venetians, and Prussians in the late 19th century.

== History ==
=== The beginning ===
In 1870, chairman Dr. João Sertório created the colony of Conde d'Eu, in honor of the emperor's son-in-law, who married Princess Isabel. The two colonies had 32 square leagues of land. The region did not attract much interest, because its lands were rugged. An infrastructure investment was necessary to attract settlers, but as the government was not willing to make such an investment, the settlement sought other resources to make the land habitable and arable. The government decided to populate the region with European immigrants.

The settlement of Colony Conde d'Eu occurred at the end of the imperial stage. The first immigrants arrived on July 9, 1870, and they were all Prussians (Germans). At the same period, some Amerindian families, or "Bugres" as they were commonly identified, also settled there. During this period of settlement, the Germans lived on subsistence agriculture. At that time, the only existing road, which was in terrible condition, connected Conde D'Eu to Montenegro through Maratá. Using this road, some Swiss, Italian, French, Austrian and Polish immigrants arrived in 1874 and 1875.

=== Italian settlement ===
The largest number of immigrants came from Italy. The Colony Conde d'Eu was the first nucleus of colonization in mountain region of Rio Grande do Sul. The population of the colony, which in 1875 was of only 720 inhabitants, reached 870 persons in 1876. From 1890, when the colony was established, the houses and buildings that today form the Historical Center were built. On October 31, 1900, the government raised the Colony Conde d'Eu to a municipality, which then became Garibaldi.

Today, almost all the inhabitants of the city are descended from immigrants.

== Wine and sparkling wine productions ==
When the Italian immigrants came to Garibaldi they brought vineyards. Over time, wine production became very important to the regional economy. More recently, sparkling wine also started to be produced there, and the town is now the main producer of the beverage in Brazil.

== Social and Economic Information ==
Infra Structure

Number of Elementary Schools: 25; High School: Three; Number of Schools of Higher Education: One; Private Schools: Two; Number of schools in Child Education: Four; Sewerage system (% of households served): 90%; Supply of drinking water (% of households served): 98%; Number of squares and parks of urban areas: 14;

Economy (2007)

Companies located in the city: Industry: 319, Commerce: 788; Services: 1152 and 220 professionals. Economic base: Industry

Geography

Altitude: 613m; Climate: Subtropical; Temperature: In summer reaches 33 °C (91 °F) in winter -3.5 °C (38.3 °F); No. of Districts: 27; Area of the city: 169.69 km^{2}; Access: RSC 470 / RSC 453 - Route of the Sun / BR 116 / RSC 240 / RSC 446.

== Tourism ==
Route of the Sparkling Wines

Under coordination of the Secretary of Tourism, Sebrae and Atuaserra, seven wineries and beverage companies of Garibaldi are integrated to implement a roadmap that sought to explore the main product of Garibaldi: the champagne. In this route the tourist has the opportunity to taste the most famous and delicious Brazilian sparkling wines, in addition to knowing the location and process of preparing the drink in a city that is characterized by the charm of its historic architecture, beauty landscape and the friendliness of its people.

Road of Flavour

To offer to the visitors a unique opportunity, five communities developed the road of flavour project, a tour of vineyards and valleys through caves and churches, tasting the colonial products and local wines. All of that produced with raw materials grown on each property.

== Climate ==
Climate data for Garibaldi (1961 - 1990)
Month	Jan	Feb	Mar	Apr	May	Jun	Jul	Aug	Sep	Oct	Nov	Dec	Year
Mean daily maximum °C (°F)	27.0 (80.6)	26.1 (79.0)	26.1 (79.0)	23.0 (73.4)	20.0 (68.0)	17.7 (63.9)	18.0 (64.4)	18.9 (66.0)	20.4 (68.7)	22.7 (72.9)	25.1 (77.2)	27.2 (81.0)	22.7 (72.8)
Daily mean °C (°F)	22.4 (72.3)	22.0 (71.6)	21.4 (70.5)	18.3 (64.9)	15.6 (60.1)	13.5 (56.3)	13.6 (56.5)	14.3 (57.7)	15.8 (60.4)	17.7 (63.9)	19.9 (67.8)	21.9 (71.4)	18.0 (64.4)
Mean daily minimum °C (°F)	17.7 (63.9)	17.9 (64.2)	16.6 (61.9)	13.6 (56.5)	11.2 (52.2)	9.2 (48.6)	9.1 (48.4)	9.7 (49.5)	11.1 (52.0)	12.6 (54.7)	14.6 (58.3)	16.5 (61.7)	13.3 (56.0)
Average precipitation mm (inches)	136.4 (5.37)	129.9 (5.11)	177.4 (6.98)	127.9 (5.04)	138.2 (5.44)	152.8 (6.02)	135.9 (5.35)	121.8 (4.80)	155.8 (6.13)	147.5 (5.81)	99.9 (3.93)	122.7 (4.83)	1,646.2 (64.81)
Source: Clic RBS (in Portuguese)

== International relations ==
=== Twin towns - Sister cities ===
Garibaldi is twinned with:

- Conegliano in Italy

== Notable people ==
- Everaldo Stum Football player

== See also ==
- List of municipalities in Rio Grande do Sul
