= Veranópolis =

Municipality in Rio Grande do Sul, Brazil

Coordinates: 28°57′S 51°33′W

- Municipality
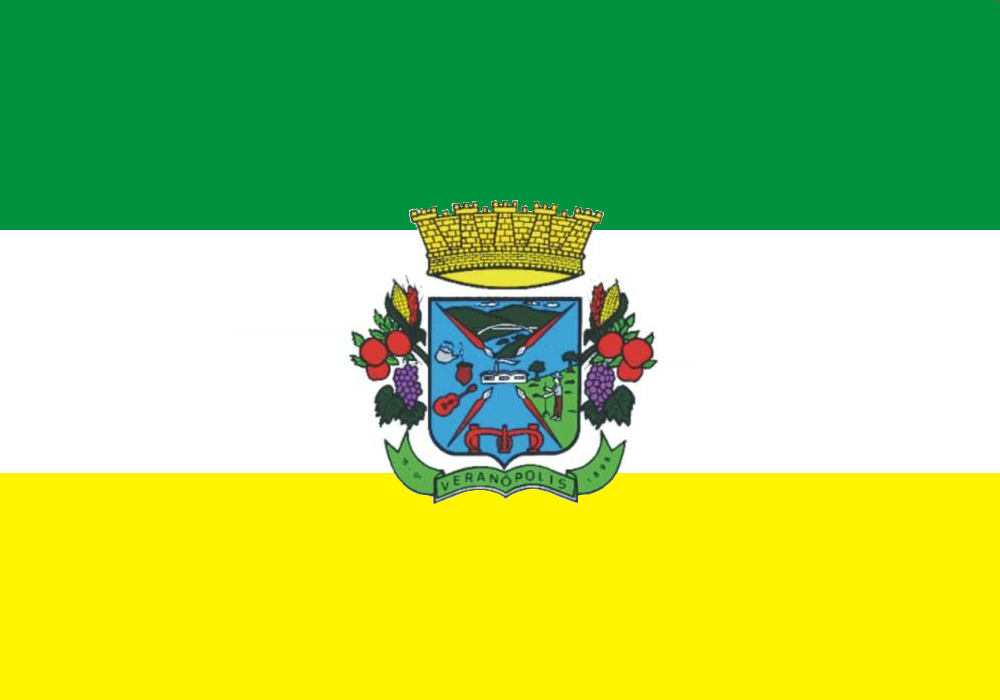
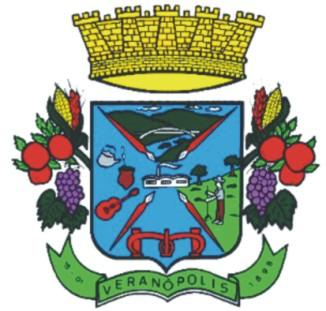
- Flag Coat of arms
- Interactive map of Veranópolis
- Country: Brazil
- Time zone: UTC−3 (BRT)

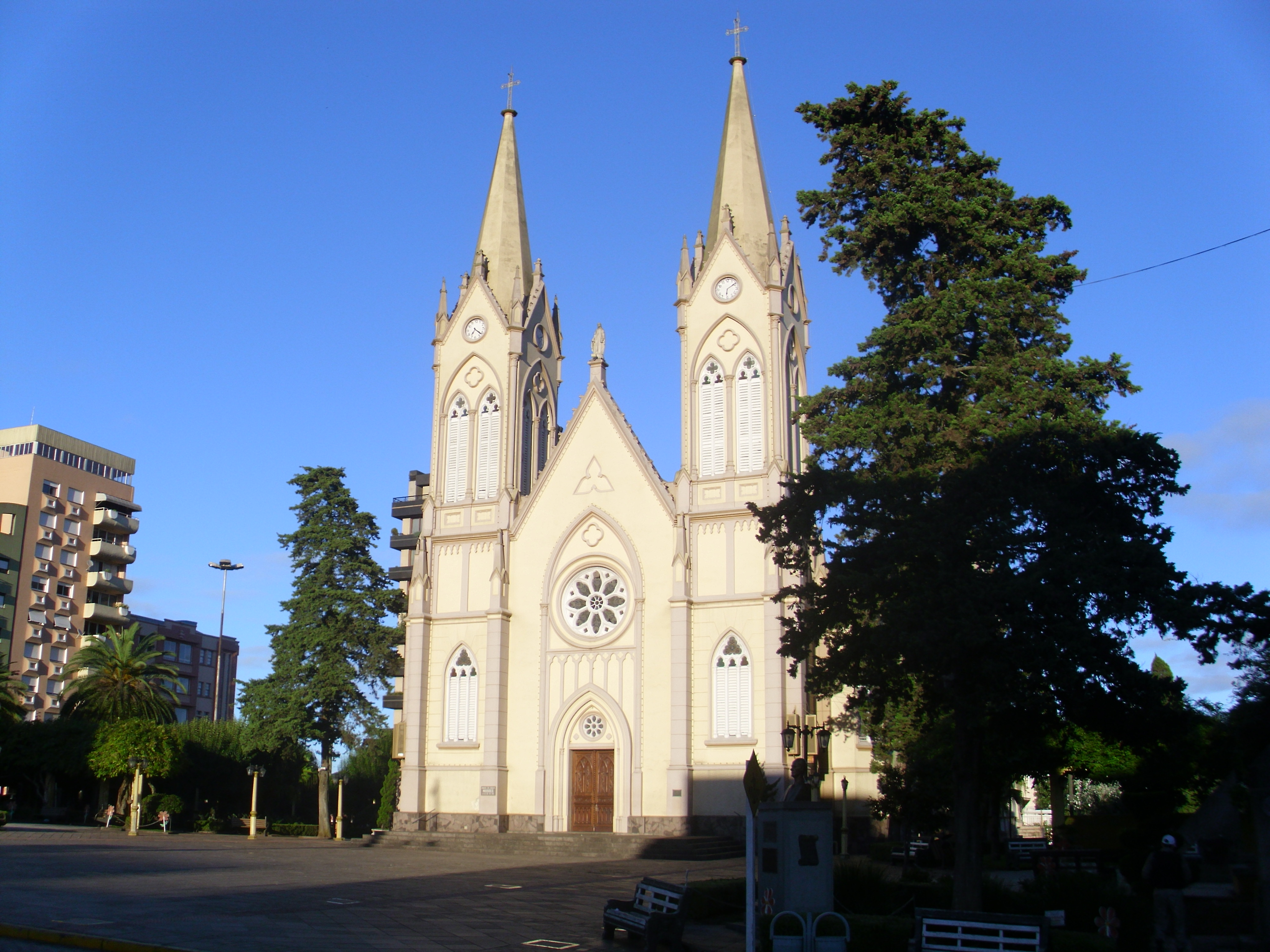
São Luiz Gonzaga Church.

Veranópolis is a municipality in the state of Rio Grande do Sul, Brazil. As of 2020, the estimated population was 26,533.

Veranópolis, like most of its neighbouring towns, is known as one of the cities with highest standards of living in Brazil. The city is also known for being home to one of the largest gun exporters in Brazil, E.R. Amantino, which produces several hunting rifles marketed in the United States by Stoeger Industries, and some models of combat shotguns for the Brazilian Army and São Paulo City Metropolitan Guard.

The city also is a big name in energy production, with the biggest Brazilian non-governmental biodiesel plant, Oleoplan S.A with an authorized capacity of 1.050.000 liters per day (277 380.655 US gallons per day) and a power plant that supplies 130MV (Monte Claro Plant) of hydroelectricity, due to the large river (Rio das Antas) and the landscape of highlands.

Veranópolis is also home of the Veranópolis Esporte Clube (VEC), a well known soccer team in the state's soccer league.

The town also hosts a small sports airclub which serves as a local airport for the region.

== Commerce and trade ==
Veranópolis, like its neighbouring towns, is known for wine production hosting several wineries.

Industrial activity is also a major factor for the town, who hosts several sports goods industry such as Coopershoes (sports footgear), Dal Ponte (sports clothing) and E.R Amantino (sports guns). Also, outside the sports goods industry, there is Oleoplan S.A (biodiesel and soy products).

The town also has some small tourism revenue due to the wineries, nearby waterparks and its prime location in the Serra Gaúcha. Some enterprises were created to explore this, such as the Mirante da Serra, the first rotative tower restaurant in Brazil and the highest building in the region.

== Notable people ==
- Cássio Ramos Football player
- José Lewgoy Brazilian Actor
- Mansueto Bernardi Brazilian Writer
- Maria do Rosário Brazilian Member of the Chamber of Deputies of Brazil
- Sofia Cavedon State Deputy of Rio Grande do Sul
- Júlio Posenato Brazilian architect and researcher
- Hermes Zaneti Brazilian Politician

== Climate ==
Climate data for Veranópolis, elevation 705 m (2,313 ft), (1976–2005)
Month	Jan	Feb	Mar	Apr	May	Jun	Jul	Aug	Sep	Oct	Nov	Dec	Year
Record high °C (°F)	32.2 (90.0)	31.8 (89.2)	30.9 (87.6)	28.8 (83.8)	26.5 (79.7)	25.0 (77.0)	26.0 (78.8)	28.0 (82.4)	29.1 (84.4)	30.4 (86.7)	31.5 (88.7)	32.1 (89.8)	32.2 (90.0)
Mean daily maximum °C (°F)	27.2 (81.0)	26.8 (80.2)	25.5 (77.9)	22.3 (72.1)	19.6 (67.3)	17.5 (63.5)	17.8 (64.0)	18.8 (65.8)	20.1 (68.2)	22.6 (72.7)	24.5 (76.1)	26.4 (79.5)	22.4 (72.4)
Daily mean °C (°F)	21.9 (71.4)	21.7 (71.1)	20.5 (68.9)	17.5 (63.5)	14.7 (58.5)	12.7 (54.9)	12.9 (55.2)	13.8 (56.8)	15.1 (59.2)	17.4 (63.3)	19.1 (66.4)	20.9 (69.6)	17.4 (63.2)
Mean daily minimum °C (°F)	16.7 (62.1)	16.7 (62.1)	15.5 (59.9)	12.7 (54.9)	9.8 (49.6)	8.0 (46.4)	8.1 (46.6)	8.8 (47.8)	10.2 (50.4)	12.2 (54.0)	13.7 (56.7)	15.5 (59.9)	12.3 (54.2)
Record low °C (°F)	10.7 (51.3)	11.1 (52.0)	9.5 (49.1)	5.4 (41.7)	1.0 (33.8)	−1.2 (29.8)	−0.8 (30.6)	0.2 (32.4)	1.9 (35.4)	4.7 (40.5)	7.1 (44.8)	9.5 (49.1)	−1.2 (29.8)
Average precipitation mm (inches)	183.0 (7.20)	161.0 (6.34)	145.0 (5.71)	129.0 (5.08)	142.0 (5.59)	132.0 (5.20)	156.0 (6.14)	124.0 (4.88)	155.0 (6.10)	204.0 (8.03)	152.0 (5.98)	172.0 (6.77)	1,855 (73.02)
Mean monthly sunshine hours	231	206	214	188	181	150	167	168	169	203	222	241	2,340
Source 1: Empresa Brasileira de Pesquisa Agropecuária (EMBRAPA)
Source 2: Climatempo (precipitation)

== See also ==
- List of municipalities in Rio Grande do Sul
