= Esporte Clube Passo Fundo =

Football club in Brazil

Passo Fundo
- Full name: Esporte Clube Passo Fundo
- Nicknames: Tricolor; 14; Galo do Planalto; O Clube de Todos Nós; O Mais Copeiro; O clube que nasceu campeão'
- Founded: January 10, 1986
- Ground: Estádio Vermelhão da Serra
- Capacity: 19,000
- President: Carlos Augusto Castro
- Head Coach: Leocir Dall’Astra
- League: Campeonato Gaúcho Série A2
- 2025: Gaúcho Série A2, 5th of 15
- Website: http://www.esporteclubepassofundo.com.br/
Home colors	Away colors

Esporte Clube Passo Fundo, commonly referred to as Passo Fundo, is a Brazilian football club based in Passo Fundo, Rio Grande do Sul. It currently plays in Campeonato Gaúcho Série A2, the second level of the Rio Grande do Sul state football league.

== History ==
The club was founded on January 10, 1986, as a result of a merger between 14 de Julho (founded in 1921) and Gaúcho (founded in 1918), and adopted as its colors 14 de Julho's red and Gaúcho's green. Gaúcho left the merger after only one year, but the club kept its name and colors. They won the Campeonato Gaúcho Second Division in 1986.

== Honours ==
=== State ===
- Copa FGF
  - Runners-up (1): 2022
- Campeonato Gaúcho Série A2
  - Winners (2): 1986,2026
- Copa Serrana
  - Winners (1): 2013

=== City ===
- Campeonato Citadino de Passo Fundo
  - Winners (19): 1922, 1925, 1930, 1943, 1945, 1947, 1955, 1956, 1957, 1958, 1958, 1959, 1959, 1960, 1962, 1969, 1978, 2020, 2022

== Season Records ==
Season	League	Result		
Season	League	Result	Stage (Teams)	Position
1999	Primeira Divisão	Second Stage (12)	12th	
2000	Primeira Divisão	Second Stage (8)	8th	
2001	Primeira Divisão	First Stage (13)	7th ^{4 bye}	
2002	Primeira Divisão	First Stage (13)	9th ^{4 bye}	
2003	Primeira Divisão "B"	First Stage (14)	11th ^{4 bye}	
2004	Primeira Divisão "B"	First Stage (14)	6th ^{4 bye}	
2005	Primeira Divisão	First Stage (3*6er)	9th 3rd (group)	
2006	Primeira Divisão	First Stage (3*6er)	17th 6th (group)	
2007	-	-	-	
2009	-	-	-	
2009	Second Division	First Stage	>16th	
2009	-	-	-	
2010	Second Division	Round of 8	8th	
2011	Second Division	2nd stage(20)	19th	
2012	Second Division	Finale(4)	2nd	
2013	Primeira Divisão	Quarterfinals(8)	6th	
2014	Primeira Divisão	First Stage		
2015	Primeira Divisão			

Notes:*

2000 and 2001:Four teams had byes in the first stage (Gre-nal, Juventude and Caxias(2001)/Pelotas(2002) )

2003 and 2004:Gre-nal and Caju did not participate in the regular first stage.

== Stadium ==
Esporte Clube Passo Fundo play their home games at Estádio Vermelhão da Serra. The stadium has a maximum capacity of 19,000 people.
