= Bento Gonçalves, Rio Grande do Sul =

Municipality of Rio Grande do Sul, Brazil

Bento Gonçalves
- Municipality
- Municipality of Bento Gonçalves
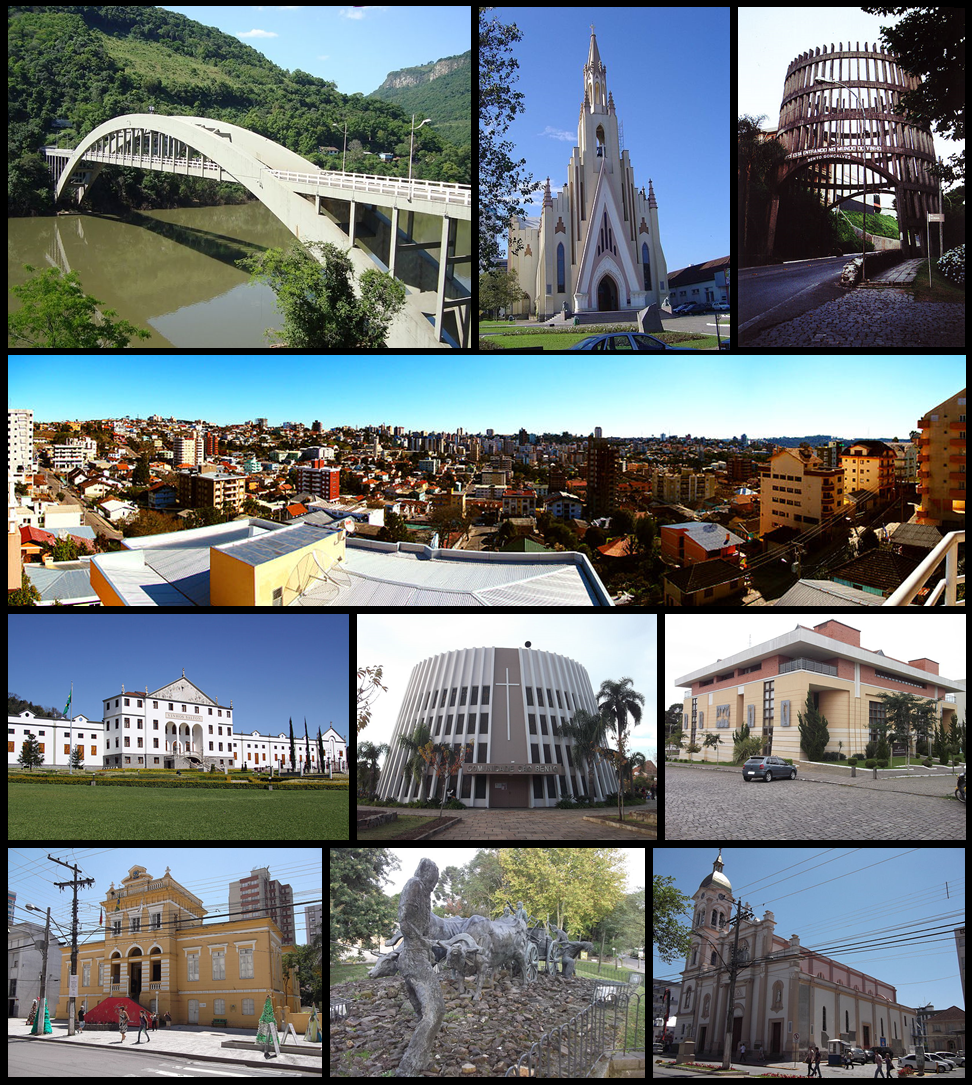

- Flag Coat of arms
- Nickname: Capital of the wine
- Location in Rio Grande do Sul

- Location in Brazil
- Coordinates: 29°10′15″S 51°31′08″W
- Country: Brazil
- Region: South
- State: Rio Grande do Sul
- Founded: 11 October 1890

Government
  - Mayor: Diogo Siqueira (PSDB) ^{(2021-2024)}

Area
  - Total: 382.513 km^{2} (147.689 sq mi)
- IBGE/2002
- Elevation: 690 m (2,260 ft)

Population (2022 Census)
  - Total: 123,151
  - Estimate (2025): 127,977
  - Density: 280.62/km^{2} (726.8/sq mi)
- Time zone: UTC−3 (BRT)
- Postal Code: 95700-000
- Area code: +55 54
- Website: bentogoncalves.rs.gov.br

Bento Gonçalves (Portuguese pronunciation: [ˈbẽtu ɡõˈsawvis]) is a municipality located in the state of Rio Grande do Sul, Brazil. Created in 1875, it is one of the centers of the Italian immigration in Brazil. It is also known as the 'wine capital of Brazil' due to its vineyards and wine production. In 2022 Census, its estimated population was 123,151 inhabitants.

Ernesto Geisel, President of Brazil from 1974 to 1979 (under the military government), was born in Bento Gonçalves in 1907.

== Etymology ==
The city has changed names three times in history. Before the Italian immigration began, the place where the city downtown is located today was crossed by horsemen, and since there was well known north–south trail with a small wooden cross at the place, the name Cruzinha ("little cross") was used to name this region. After a decree of the effective governor of the province in the 1870s, the area was renamed Colônia Dona Isabel ("Dona Isabel Colony"), after the Brazilian princess Isabel de Bragança.

In 1890, Colônia Dona Isabel separated from the municipality of Montenegro, and was renamed in honour of Bento Gonçalves da Silva, leader of the rebel forces of the Farroupilha Revolution 45 years earlier, and first president of the short-lived Riograndense Republic.

== History ==
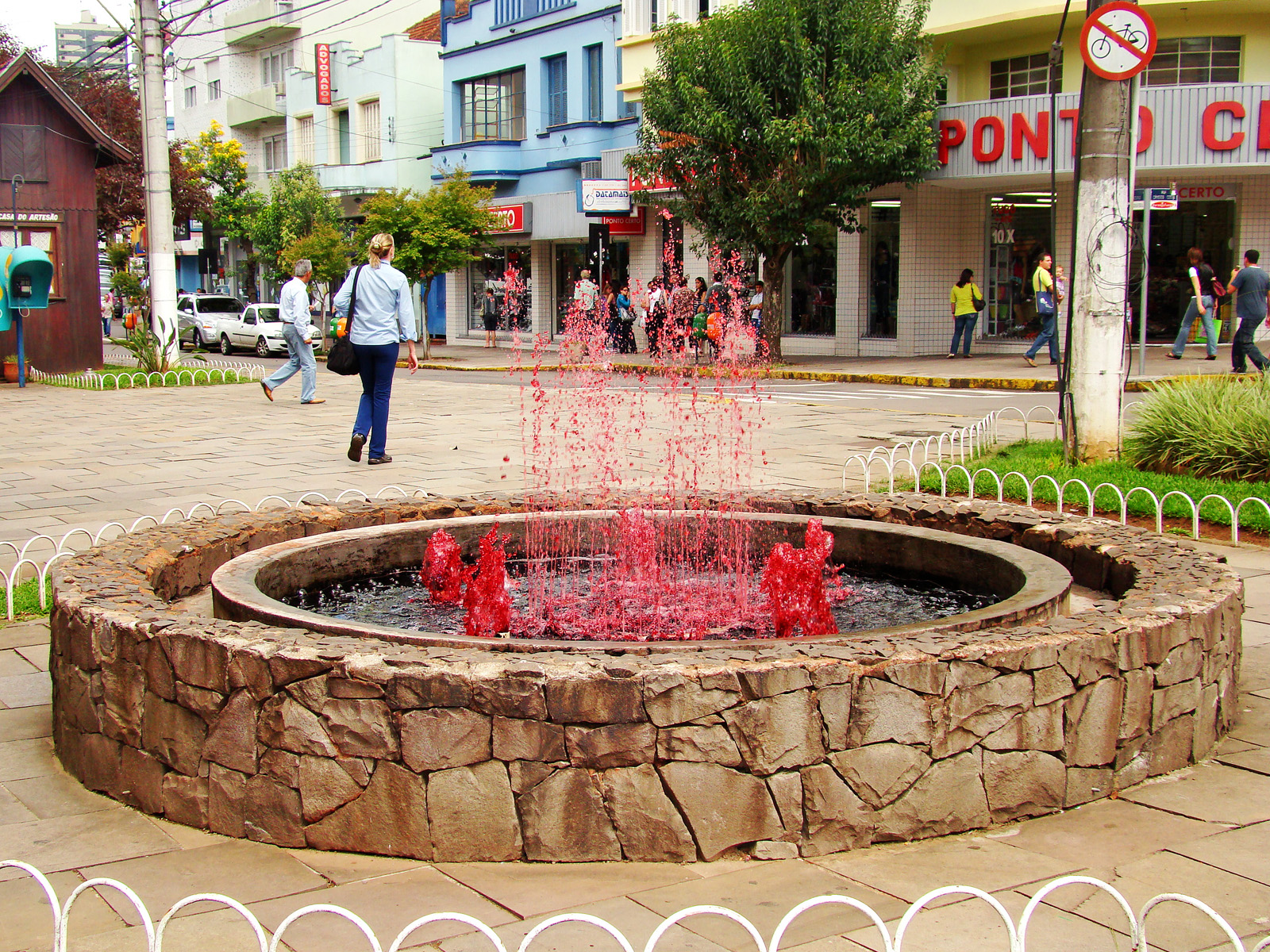
Bacchus wine fountain near Town Hall.

The Maria Fumaça steam locomotive at the Bento Gonçalves train station. Riding the locomotive is one of the city's major tourist attractions.

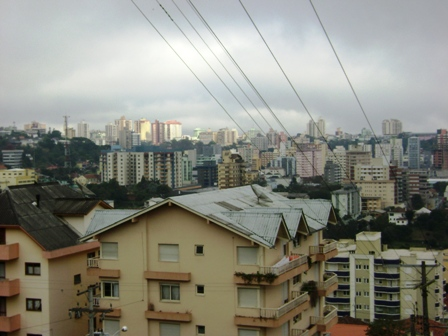
View of the Central Business District from the steep hills of Bento Gonçalves.

Before 1870, the area where the city is located (then known as Cruzinha) was inhabited, as the rest of the region, by Indigenous people of the "jê" tribe.

In 1875, the Brazilian government created, in the state of Rio Grande do Sul, four settlements to receive Italian immigrants. In the Cruzinha area, a settlement was created called Dona Isabel. "Dona Isabel" received the first 25 families of Italian settlers in that same year. They mostly came from the region of Trento.

During the next few decades, the region was settled by immigrants coming mostly from the Italian regions of Veneto, Trentino, and Lombardia.

In 1890, Dona Isabel was elevated to the category of city, changing its name to Bento Gonçalves (named after the military leader of the Ragamuffin War).

The Italian immigrants mostly worked in grape and wine production.

During the first few decades of the 20th century, the city continued to receive immigrants. Besides the Italians, there were large groups of Polish, German, Swedish, French, and Spanish immigrants.

At that time, there were already some functioning wine factories and the furniture and metallurgic industry was just starting to take off.

The railways arrived at the city in 1919, helping to connect it with the capital of the state, Porto Alegre, and facilitating the transport of the city's economic production. There were regular passenger trains running until 1976; however, today the railways are used mostly to transport goods.

The electric light distribution system was installed between 1919 and 1927. The Bartolomeu Tacchini Hospital was built during the same period.

In 1950, the population was 22,600. Industrial activity expanded, especially in the wine, furniture, leather, chemical, metal, and mechanical sectors.

In 1967, the city organized the first National Wine Festival (Fenavinho), receiving, for the first time, a visit from a Brazilian President.

The city started to organize and receive many important national and international events. It is now home to the second largest exposition park in Latin America. Among these events are the Movelsul (Furniture Fair), FIMMA Brasil (Furniture Machinery Fair), Vino Brasil (Wine Machinery Fair), Avaliação Nacional de Vinhos (National Wine Assessment), Fenavinho e Expobento (Commercial Fair).

== Economy ==
Bento Gonçalves is among the ten largest economies in Rio Grande do Sul. It is the largest producer of wine in Brazil and has the second largest furniture production industry in the country. It also has important metal, mechanical, plastic, and chemical industries. It has the highest Human Development Index of Rio Grande do Sul and the sixth among all Brazilian cities - 0,870 (PNUD/2000).

== Geography ==
The average elevation of Bento Gonçalves is 690 meters above the sea level.

=== Climate ===
Summers are warm and winters are mild. During the climatic winter frosts are common and snow is rare. The highest temperature officially recorded in the city was 36 °C and the lowest was -4,5 °C.

Climate data for Bento Gonçalves, Rio Grande do Sul (1981–2010)
Month	Jan	Feb	Mar	Apr	May	Jun	Jul	Aug	Sep	Oct	Nov	Dec	Year
Mean daily maximum °C (°F)	27.3 (81.1)	27.0 (80.6)	26.0 (78.8)	22.9 (73.2)	19.3 (66.7)	17.5 (63.5)	17.4 (63.3)	19.6 (67.3)	20.3 (68.5)	22.7 (72.9)	24.7 (76.5)	26.7 (80.1)	22.6 (72.7)
Daily mean °C (°F)	21.9 (71.4)	21.6 (70.9)	20.5 (68.9)	17.9 (64.2)	14.6 (58.3)	13.0 (55.4)	12.5 (54.5)	14.0 (57.2)	14.8 (58.6)	17.5 (63.5)	19.2 (66.6)	20.9 (69.6)	17.4 (63.3)
Mean daily minimum °C (°F)	17.7 (63.9)	17.7 (63.9)	16.6 (61.9)	13.8 (56.8)	10.9 (51.6)	9.3 (48.7)	8.5 (47.3)	9.5 (49.1)	10.5 (50.9)	13.0 (55.4)	14.5 (58.1)	16.4 (61.5)	13.2 (55.8)
Average precipitation mm (inches)	162.1 (6.38)	151.7 (5.97)	117.8 (4.64)	124.3 (4.89)	130.3 (5.13)	144.4 (5.69)	188.5 (7.42)	148.9 (5.86)	161.3 (6.35)	185.6 (7.31)	138.4 (5.45)	128.6 (5.06)	1,781.9 (70.15)
Average precipitation days (≥ 1.0 mm)	12	11	10	8	9	10	10	9	10	10	9	8	116
Average relative humidity (%)	75.7	77.9	77.1	77.5	80.1	80.5	77.3	72.5	75.0	75.9	73.2	72.7	76.3
Mean monthly sunshine hours	223.0	197.4	212.5	181.9	152.4	131.2	153.2	168.8	169.1	183.4	220.4	241.1	2,234.4
Source: Instituto Nacional de Meteorologia

== Tourism ==
The Maria Fumaça steam locomotive offers tourist trips in the rolling countryside of Bento Gonçalves, Garibaldi and Carlos Barbosa.

Museums about the Italian heritage of the city include the Epopéia Italiana.

The city is also part of Vale dos Vinhedos, a region with 82 km square located at the limits of Garibaldi, Monte Belo do Sul and Bento Gonçalves. Many restaurants and wineries can be found at Vale dos Vinhedos, making the region a well known enotourism route in Brazil.

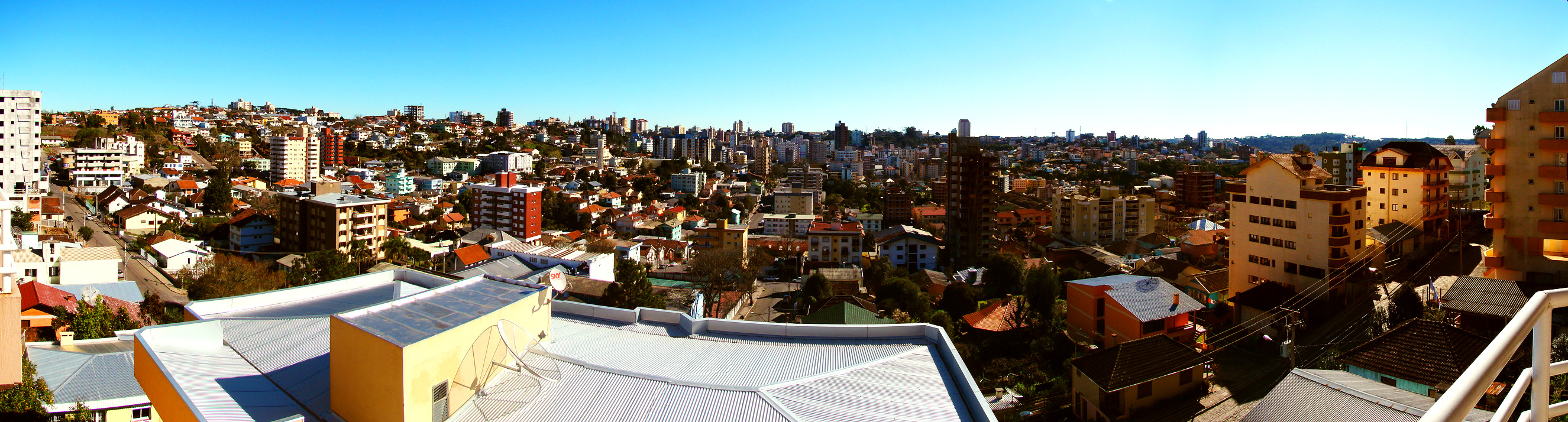
View of Bento Gonçalves from the Planalto neighborhood.

== Twin towns – sister cities ==
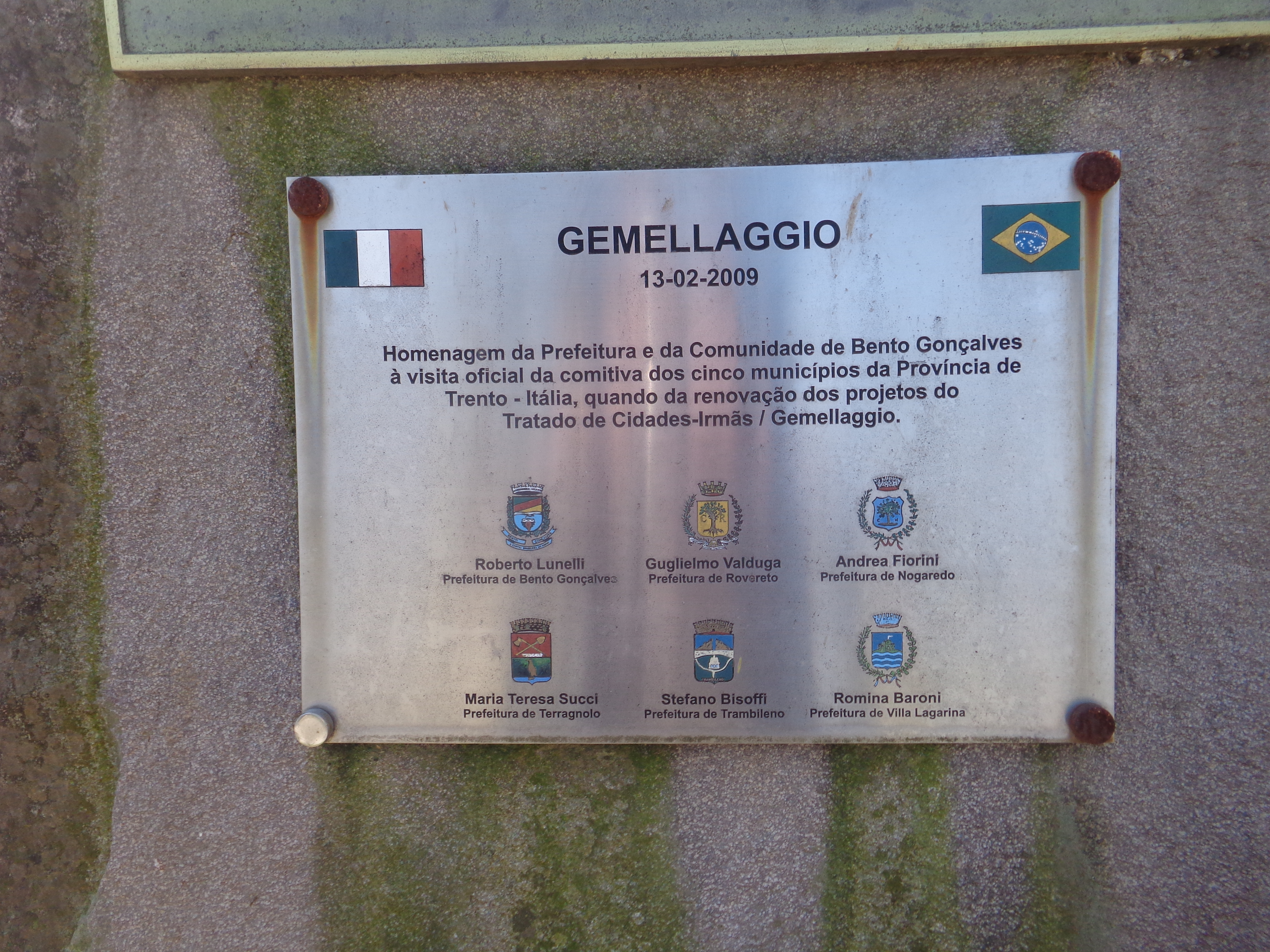
Twin towns in Italy

Bento Gonçalves is twinned with:

- Brentonico, Italy
- Cartaxo, Portugal
- Isera, Italy
- Luján de Cuyo, Argentina
- Mori, Italy
- Nogaredo, Italy
- Rovereto, Italy
- Terragnolo, Italy
- Trambileno, Italy
- Villa Lagarina, Italy

Main reasons for twinning with Italian municipalities are Italian immigration history and enotourism.

== See also ==
- List of municipalities in Rio Grande do Sul
