= Veranópolis Esporte Clube Recreativo e Cultural =

Veranópolis
- Full name: Veranópolis Esporte Clube; Recreativo e Cultural
- Nicknames: VEC; Pentacolor
- Founded: January 15, 1992; 34 years ago
- Ground: Antônio David Farina
- Capacity: 8,000
- President: Gilberto Generosi
- Head coach: Sananduva
- League: Campeonato Gaúcho Série A2
- 2022: 5th of 16
Home colors	Away colors

Veranópolis Esporte Clube Recreativo e Cultural, commonly referred to as Veranópolis, is a Brazilian football club based in Veranópolis, Rio Grande do Sul. It currently plays in Campeonato Gaúcho Série A2, the second level of the Rio Grande do Sul state football league.

== History ==
On January 15, 1992, Veranópolis Esporte Clube Recreativo e Cultural was founded, after two local clubs, Dalban and Veranense, fused.

In 1993, Veranópolis, managed by Tite, won the Campeonato Gaúcho Série A2.

In 2007, the club, managed by Paulo Porto, reached the Campeonato Gaúcho semifinals, where the club was defeated by Juventude of Caxias do Sul.

== Club colors and nickname ==
The club's colors are blue, green, red, yellow and white. Because of its colors, Veranópolis is nicknamed Pentacolor (meaning five colors). The club is also nicknamed by the acronym VEC.

== Stadium ==
Veranópolis Esporte Clube Recreativo e Cultural's home stadium is Antônio David Farina stadium, located in Medianeira neighborhood, with a maximum capacity of 8,000 people.

== Honours ==
- Campeonato Gaúcho Série A2
  - Winners (1): 1993
- Campeonato do Interior Gaúcho
  - Winners (3): 1997, 1999, 2012

== Current team (2015) ==
Note: Flags indicate national team as defined under FIFA eligibility rules; some limited exceptions apply. Players may hold more than one non-FIFA nationality.

No.	Pos.	Nation	Player
—	GK	BRA	Josemar
—	GK	BRA	Matheus Cavichioli
—	GK	BRA	Rykelvi
—	DF	BRA	Afonso
—	DF	BRA	Edson Borges
—	DF	BRA	Jadson
—	DF	BRA	Leonardo Dagostini
—	DF	BRA	Luciano Amaral
—	DF	BRA	Marcel
—	DF	BRA	Rafael Gevehr
—	DF	BRA	Richard
—	MF	BRA	Claytinho

No.	Pos.	Nation	Player
—	MF	BRA	Eduardinho
—	MF	BRA	Felipe Guedes
—	MF	BRA	Glauber
—	MF	BRA	Luiz Grando
—	MF	BRA	Marcos Rogério
—	MF	BRA	Rafael Mineiro
—	MF	BRA	Vanderlei
—	MF	BRA	Willian Ribeiro
—	FW	BRA	David Dener
—	FW	BRA	Erik Nascimento (on loan from Grêmio)
—	FW	BRA	Lê
—	FW	BRA	Tulio Renan
