= 2010 Copa FGF =

Copa Enio Costamilan

Tournament details
- Country: Brazil
- Teams: 16

Final positions
- Champions: Internacional B
- Runners-up: Cerâmica
- Série D: Cerâmica
- Cpa do Brasil: Cerâmica

Tournament statistics
- Matches played: 120
- Goals scored: 292 (2.43 per match)

2010 Copa FGF, also known as Copa Enio Costamilan, is the 7th edition of Copa FGF. 18 team participated in the tournament.

The winner would be qualified for 2010 Recopa Sul-Brasileira and 2011 Campeonato Brasileiro Série D. However, the winner may already qualified for the higher division or withdraw to play. Moreover, If 2011 Campeonato Gaúcho winner and runner-up were Grêmio and Internacional (GRE–NAL), the runner-up of the cup would be allocated 1 of the 3 spot of the state to 2012 Copa do Brasil, otherwise the champion, runner-up and the third place of the league would be qualified to the cup.

== Format ==
The clubs were divided into three groups according to their location (Metropolitan, Border and Mountain), and would be play 10 matches in double round-robin in each group. 16 teams would qualify for the next stage, which the group winner would be paired with fifth place; runner-up paired with fourth place. The best third place would against the best sixth place and the two other against each other.

Teams of lower rank plays their home match first and the opponent of the next stage would be paired based upon bracket.

== Participating teams ==
Teams filled their inferior squad to the tournament: Internacional used its B team, Porto Alegre fielded its youth products along with other contracted players and Grêmio used its B team (under-20 team).

=== Campeonato Gaúcho ===
- Caxias do Sul (Caxias do Sul)
- Grêmio (Porto Alegre)
- Internacional (Porto Alegre)
- Novo Hamburgo (Novo Hamburgo)
- Pelotas (Pelotas)
- Porto Alegre (Porto Alegre)
- São José (Porto Alegre)

=== Segunda Divisão ===
- 14 de Julho (Santana do Livramento)
- Bagé (Bagé)
- Carazinho (Carazinho)
- Cerâmica (Gravataí)
- Cruzeiro (Porto Alegre)
- Guarany (Bagé)
- Guarany (Camaquã)
- Juventus (Santa Rosa)
- Lajeadense (Lajeado)
- Riopardense (Rio Pardo)
- Sapucaiense (Sapucaia do Sul)

== Group stage ==
=== Group 1 – Metropolitan ===
Pos	Team	Pld	W	D	L	GF	GA	GD	Pts
1	Internacional	10	5	2	3	16	12	+4	17
2	Porto Alegre	10	4	3	3	13	6	+7	15
3	Sapucaiense	10	4	3	3	9	13	−4	15
4	São José-RS	10	3	4	3	8	10	−2	13
5	Cruzeiro-RS	10	3	3	4	10	9	+1	12
6	Grêmio	10	3	1	6	7	13	−6	10

Updated to match(es) played on 25 October 2010. Source: FGF (in Portuguese)
Rules for classification: 1st points; 2nd number of wins; 3rd goal difference; 4th number of goals scored; 5th head-to-head points; 6th discipline record (sent off); 7th discipline record (caution); 8th draw at FGF

=== Group 2 – Highlands ===
Pos	Team	Pld	W	D	L	GF	GA	GD	Pts
1	Caxias	10	7	2	1	19	7	+12	23
2	Cerâmica	10	6	0	4	15	17	−2	18
3	Novo Hamburgo	10	5	3	2	24	9	+15	18
4	Juventus-RS	10	4	2	4	14	14	0	14
5	Lajeadense	10	2	3	5	7	11	−4	9
6	Atlético Carazinho	10	0	2	8	7	28	−21	2

Updated to match(es) played on 25 October 2010. Source: FGF (in Portuguese)
Rules for classification: 1st points; 2nd number of wins; 3rd goal difference; 4th number of goals scored; 5th head-to-head points; 6th discipline record (sent off); 7th discipline record (caution); 8th draw at FGF

=== Group 3 – Frontier Region ===
Pos	Team	Pld	W	D	L	GF	GA	GD	Pts
1	Pelotas	10	5	3	2	11	6	+5	18
2	Guarany-CM	10	5	2	3	13	10	+3	17
3	Guarany-BG	10	5	0	5	11	8	+3	15
4	14 de Julho	10	5	0	5	11	10	+1	15
5	Bagé	10	3	3	4	8	10	−2	12
6	Riopardense	10	3	0	7	7	17	−10	9

Updated to match(es) played on 25 October 2010. Source: FGF (in Portuguese)
Rules for classification: 1st points; 2nd number of wins; 3rd goal difference; 4th number of goals scored; 5th head-to-head points; 6th discipline record (sent off); 7th discipline record (caution); 8th draw at FGF

== Knockout stage ==
=== Bracket ===
First round
Internacional	3	1	4
Lajeadense	2	0	2
Guarany de Camaquã	2	2	4
Juventus	2	0	2
Novo Hamburgo	4	4	8
Grêmio	1	0	1
Pelotas	0	1	1
Cruzeiro	0	0	0
Caxias	1	3	4
Bagé	2	0	2
Guarany de Bagé	1	2	3
Sapucaiense	3	2	5
Cerâmica	0	1	1
São José	0	0	0
Porto Alegre	1	3	4
14 de Julho	1	1	2

Quarter-finals
Internacional	3	2	5
Guarany de Camaquã	1	0	1
Novo Hamburgo	2	0	2
Pelotas	2	1	3
Caxias	0	1	1
Sapucaiense	0	2	2
Cerâmica	3	3	6
Porto Alegre	2	1	3

Semi-finals
Internacional	1	2	3
Pelotas	1	1	2
Sapucaiense^{*}	0	2	2
Cerâmica	2	1	3

Final
Internacional^{*}	2	3	5
Cerâmica	1	0	1

- Note: Order of legs reversed except starred (^{*})

=== Round of 16 ===
==== First leg ====
20 October 2010
20:00

Lajeadense	2–3	Internacional
Robert 5'; Mallmann 53'	Report	Guto 8'; Ricardo 40'; Augusto 70'

Estádio Florestal, Lajeado
Attendance: 11
Referee: José Roberto Raach

21 October 2010
20:00

Juventus	2–2	Guarany de Camaquã
Tatto 35'; João Carlos 47'	Report	Raphael Paraíba 29'; Marcio 51'

Estádio Municipal Carlos Denardin, Santa Rosa
Attendance: 290
Referee: Rudnei Braga Corrêa

21 October 2010
16:00

Grêmio	1–4	Novo Hamburgo
Bergson 56'	Report	Claudio Luiz 6'; Juba 35', 39'; Michel 65'

Estrela d'Alva, Bagé
Attendance: 0
Referee: Fabrício Neves Corrêa

21 October 2010
16:00

Cruzeiro	0–0	Pelotas
	Report

Estádio Estrelão, Porto Alegre
Attendance: 35
Referee: Roger Goulart

21 October 2010
20:00

Bagé	2–1	Caxias
João 25'; Enzo 57'	Report	Aloísio 29'

Estádio Pedra Moura, Bagé
Referee: Anderson Daronco

21 October 2010
16:00

Sapucaiense	3–1	Guarany de Bagé
	Report

Estádio Arthur Mesquita Dias, Sapucaia do Sul
Attendance: 37
Referee: André Cieslak

21 October 2010
17:00

São José	0–0	Cerâmica
	Report

Estádio Passo d'Areia, Porto Alegre
Attendance: 85
Referee: Francisco de Paula dos Santos Silva Neto

21 October 2010
16:00

14 de Julho	1–1	Porto Alegre
Luiz Fernando 52'	Report	Júnior 88'

Estádio João Martins, Santana do Livramento
Attendance: 120
Referee: Jean Pierre Gonçalves Lima

==== Second leg ====
25 October 2010
16:00

Internacional	1–0	Lajeadense
Ricardo 68'	Report

Estádio Beira-Rio, Porto Alegre
Attendance: 0
Referee: Diego Almeida Real

24 October 2010
16:00

Guarany de Camaquã	2–0	Juventus
Raphael Paraíba 49', 63'	Report

Estádio Coronel Sílvio Luz, Camaquã
Attendance: 90
Referee: Francisco de Paula dos Santos Silva Neto

24 October 2010
16:00

Novo Hamburgo	4–0	Grêmio
Rodrigo Mendes 26'; Michel 34', 42'; Juba 68'	Report

Estádio do Vale, Novo Hamburgo
Attendance: 212
Referee: André Cieslak

24 October 2010
16:00

Pelotas	1–0	Cruzeiro
Tiago Duarte 27'	Report

Estádio Boca do Lobo, Pelotas
Attendance: 825
Referee: Anderson dos Santos Echevarria

25 October 2010
16:00

Caxias	3–0	Bagé
Rodrigo Paulista 5'; Aloísio 15'; Marco Balthazar 78'	Report

Estádio Passo d'Areia, Porto Alegre
Attendance: 0
Referee: Fabrício Neves Corrêa

24 October 2010
16:00

Guarany de Bagé	2–2	Sapucaiense
Michel Souza 68'; Dudu Branco (pen.), 73'	Report	Catatau 67'; Gian 83'

Estádio Estrela D'Alva, Bagé
Attendance: 61
Referee: David Baquini da Silva

24 October 2010
16:00

Cerâmica	1–0	São José
Rafael Paraíba 53'	Report

Estádio Antônio Vieira Ramos, Gravataí
Attendance: 88
Referee: Ronaldo Santos da Silva

24 October 2010
16:00

Porto Alegre	3–1	14 de Julho
Vanilson 30'; Juninho 55' (pen.); Leandro Alves 68'	Report (broken); Report	Hilton 46'

Estádio João da Silva Moreira, Porto Alegre
Attendance: 57
Referee: Alexandro de Oliveira Vieira

=== Quarterfinals ===
==== First leg ====
28 October 2010
16:00

Guarany de Camaquã	1–3	Internacional
Raphael Paraíba 46'	Report	Augusto 46'; Talles Cunha 67'; Ytalo 84'

Estádio Coronel Sílvio Luz, Camaquã
Attendance: 155
Referee: Ronaldo Santos da Silva

27 October 2010
19:00

Pelotas	2–2	Novo Hamburgo
Clodoaldo 6'; Tiago Duarte 28'	Report	Michel 5'; Claudio Luiz 22'

Estádio Boca do Lobo, Pelotas
Attendance: 799
Referee: Rogério Furtado Gonçalves

28 October 2010
16:00

Sapucaiense	0–0	Caxias
	Report

Estádio Arthur Mesquita Dias, Sapucaia do Sul
Attendance: 105
Referee: José Roberto Raach

27 October 2010
16:00

Porto Alegre	2–3	Cerâmica
França 79'; Bruno 88'	Report	Cidinho 2', 49'; Marcão 15'

Estádio João da Silva Moreira, Porto Alegre
Attendance: 64
Referee: André Cieslak

==== Second leg ====
30 October 2010
18:30

Internacional	2–0	Guarany de Camaquã
Ronaldo Alves 26'; Oscar 84'	Report

Estádio Beira-Rio, Porto Alegre
Attendance: 0
Referee: Fabrício Neves Corrêa

2 November 2010
16:00

Novo Hamburgo	0–1	Pelotas
	Report	Tiago Duarte 75'

Estádio do Vale, Novo Hamburgo
Attendance: 245
Referee: Francisco de Paula dos Santos Silva Neto

2 November 2010
16:00

Caxias	1–2	Sapucaiense
Itaqui 40'	Report	Luiz 35'; Alisson 88' (o.g.)

Estádio Francisco Stédile, Caxias do Sul
Attendance: 1029
Referee: Jean Pierre Gonçalves Lima

30 October 2010
16:00

Cerâmica	3–1	Porto Alegre
Dênio 15'; Robson 60'; Liniker 83'	Report	André Luís 90'

Estádio Antônio Vieira Ramos, Gravataí
Attendance: 125
Referee: José Roberto Raach

=== Semifinals ===
==== First leg ====
7 November 2010
19:00

Pelotas	1–1	Internacional
Clodoaldo 41'	Report	Guto 13'

Estádio Boca do Lobo, Pelotas
Attendance: 1763
Referee: André Cieslak

7 November 2010
16:00

Sapucaiense	0–2	Cerâmica
	Report	Santiago 82'; Dênio 87'

Estádio Arthur Mesquita Dias, Sapucaia do Sul
Attendance: 176
Referee: Márcio Cristiano Brum Coruja

==== Second leg ====
17 November 2010
17:00

Internacional	2–1	Pelotas
Guto 40'; Ytalo 84'	Report	Tiago Duarte 48'

Estádio Beira-Rio, Porto Alegre
Attendance: 0
Referee: Fabrício Neves Corrêa

14 November 2010
17:00

Cerâmica	1–2	Sapucaiense
Rafael Paraíba 7'	Report	Tiago 37'; Filipinho 75'

Estádio Antônio Vieira Ramos, Gravataí
Referee: Anderson Daronco

== Final ==
=== First leg ===
24 November 2010
17:00

Internacional B	2–1	Cerâmica
Guto 43'; Romário 51'	Report; Report	Jeferson 21'

Estádio Beira-Rio, Porto Alegre
Attendance: 178
Referee: Jean Pierre Gonçalves Lima

INTERNACIONAL B:
GK	1	Muriel
RB	2	Daniel
CB	3	Wagner Silva
CB	4	Romário	(yellow card) 51'
LB	6	Massari	(yellow card) 74'
DM	5	Juliano	(yellow card) 7'	(substituted off) 80'
DM	8	Augusto	(yellow card) 55'
AM	7	Wagner Libano	(substituted off) 67'
AM	10	Ytalo
AM	11	Sasha	(substituted off) 67'
CF	9	Guto
Substitutes:
GK	12	Rodolfo
CB	13	Eron
DF	14	Kleber
DM	15	Elton
AM	16	João Paulo	(substituted on) 80'
FW	17	Talles	(substituted on) 67'
FW	18	Fabinho	(substituted on) 67'
Manager:
Enderson Moreira

CERÂMICA:
GK	1	Donizetti
RB	4	Sidney	(yellow card) 29' (yellow-red card) 56'
CB	3	Djair
CB	5	Marcão
LB	2	Jeferson
MF	6	Pedro
DM	11	Robson
DM	8	Wagner Prestes	(yellow card) 18'
MF	10	Dênio	(substituted off) 50'
FW	9	Rafael Paraíba	(substituted off) 67'
FW	7	Cidinho	(substituted off) 83'
Substitutes:
GK	12	Diego Machado
CB	13	Vinícius
CB	14	Neguete	(substituted on) 50'
DF	15	Rafael Carvalho	(substituted on) 67'
MF	16	Bruno Alex
FW	17	Gabriel	(substituted on) 83'
FW	18	Santiago
Manager:
Leocir Dall’Astra

=== Second leg ===
28 November 2010
17:00

Cerâmica	0–3	Internacional B
	Report; Report; Report	Ytalo 51', 70'; Romário 81'

Estádio Antônio Vieira Ramos, Gravataí
Referee: Márcio Cristiano Brum Coruja

CERÂMICA:
GK	1	Donizetti
RB	3	Djair	(yellow card) 51'
CB	4	Marcão	(yellow card) 68'
CB	8	Neguete	(yellow card) 45'
LB	2	Jeferson	(substituted off) 69'
MF	6	Pedro
DM	5	Robson
DM	11	Liniker	(substituted off) 77'
MF	10	Dênio	(substituted off) 60'
FW	9	Rafael Paraíba
FW	7	Cidinho
Substitutes:
GK	12	Diego Machado
CB	13	Vinícius
DM	14	Wagner Prestes
DF	15	Rafael Carvalho	(substituted on) 77'	(yellow card) 86'
DF	16	Índio
FW	17	Gabriel	(substituted on) 69'	(yellow card) 72'
FW	18	Santiago	(substituted on) 60'
Manager:
Leocir Dall’Astra

INTERNACIONAL B:
GK	1	Muriel
RB	2	Daniel
CB	3	Wagner Silva
CB	4	Romário
LB	6	Mineiro	(yellow card) 62'
DM	5	Derley
DM	8	Elton
AM	10	Ytalo	(yellow card) 33'	(substituted off) 79'
AM	11	Ricardo Goulart	(substituted off) 85'
AM	7	Sasha	(substituted off) 67'
CF	9	Guto
Substitutes:
GK	12	Rodolfo
CB	13	Eron
LB	14	Massari
DM	15	Natan
AM	16	Wagner Libano	(substituted on) 67'	(yellow card) 89'
FW	17	Talles	(substituted on) 85'
FW	18	Fabinho	(substituted on) 79'
Manager:
Enderson Moreira

Coppa FGF
2010 Winners
(Rio Grande do Sul)
Internacional B
Second title
