= 2011 Copa FGF =

Copa Dra Laci Ughini 2011

Tournament details
- Country: Brazil
- Teams: 22

2011 Copa FGF also known as Copa Dra Laci Ughini 2011, was the 8th edition of Copa FGF. 22 teams participated in the tournament.

The winner qualified for 2011 Recopa Sul-Brasileira and 2012 Campeonato Brasileiro Série D. Moreover, if the 2012 Campeonato Gaúcho winner and runner-up were Grêmio and Internacional (GRE–NAL), the runner-up of the cup would have been allocated one of the three spots of the state to 2013 Copa do Brasil, otherwise the champion, runner-up and the third place of the league would have been qualified for the cup. If a berth for 2013 Copa do Brasil was vacant because one of the top three of 2012 Campeonato Gaúcho qualified for 2013 Copa Libertadores, the runner-up would have also qualified.

== Format ==
The clubs were divided into three groups according to their locations (Metropolitan, Border and Mountain), and played a double round-robin in each group. The best five teams in each group and the best 6th-placed team of group 1 advanced to the knockout stage. The application to the competition was opened on 20 June and 22 teams applied.

== Participating teams ==
=== Campeonato Gaúcho ===
Club	Home city	Position in 2010
Caxias	Caxias do Sul	QF
Cruzeiro (RS)	Porto Alegre	-
Grêmio	Porto Alegre	R16
Internacional	Porto Alegre	Champion
Juventude	Caxias do Sul	-
Lajeadense	Lajeado	R16
Novo Hamburgo	Novo Hamburgo	QF
Pelotas	Pelotas	SF
São José	Porto Alegre	R16

=== Segunda Divisão ===
- 14 de Julho (Santana do Livramento)
- Aimoré (São Leopoldo)
- Brasil de Pelotas (Pelotas)
- Cerâmica (Gravataí)
- Esportivo (Bento Gonçalves)
- Guarany de Bagé (Bagé)
- Guarany de Camaquã (Camaquã)
- Passo Fundo (Passo Fundo)
- Santo Ângelo (Santo Ângelo)
- São Paulo (RS) (Rio Grande)
- Riopardense (Rio Pardo)

=== Other participating teams ===
- Pedrabranca (Alvorada)
- Nova Prata

== Group stage ==
=== Group 1 – Taça Região Metropolitana ===
Pos	Team	Pld	W	D	L	GF	GA	GD	Pts
1	Novo Hamburgo	14	10	3	1	25	9	+16	33
2	Internacional	14	6	6	2	19	13	+6	24
3	Grêmio	14	6	4	4	15	13	+2	22
4	Aimoré	14	5	4	5	23	22	+1	19
5	Cerâmica	14	4	5	5	14	15	−1	17
6	Cruzeiro-RS	14	4	5	5	16	19	−3	17
7	São José-RS	14	2	4	8	15	24	−9	10
8	Pedrabranca	14	1	5	8	13	25	−12	8

Updated to match(es) played on 15 October 2011. Source: FGF (in Portuguese)
Rules for classification: 1st points; 2nd number of wins; 3rd goal difference; 4th number of goals scored; 5th head-to-head points; 6th discipline record (sent off); 7th discipline record (caution); 8th draw at FGF

=== Group 2 – Taça Região Serrana ===
Pos	Team	Pld	W	D	L	GF	GA	GD	Pts
1	Caxias	12	7	2	3	16	7	+9	23
2	Lajeadense	12	7	2	3	13	7	+6	23
3	Juventude	12	5	4	3	13	7	+6	19
4	Santo Ângelo	12	5	4	3	13	9	+4	19
5	Passo Fundo	12	5	3	4	15	19	−4	18
6	Nova Prata	12	1	4	7	10	21	−11	7
7	Esportivo	12	0	5	7	7	17	−10	5

Updated to match(es) played on 15 October 2011. Source: FGF (in Portuguese)
Rules for classification: 1st points; 2nd number of wins; 3rd goal difference; 4th number of goals scored; 5th head-to-head points; 6th discipline record (sent off); 7th discipline record (caution); 8th draw at FGF

=== Group 3 – Taça Região Fronteira ===
Pos	Team	Pld	W	D	L	GF	GA	GD	Pts	SPA	GEB	GBG	14J	PEL	RPD	GCA
1	São Paulo-RS	12	7	1	4	14	14	0	22							1–1
2	Brasil de Pelotas	12	6	0	6	21	13	+8	18							5–1
3	Guarany-BG	12	6	0	6	12	16	−4	18						0–1	
4	14 de Julho	12	5	2	5	15	10	+5	17		1–0				0–0	
5	Pelotas	12	5	2	5	14	11	+3	17			2–0				
6	Riopardense	12	5	2	5	13	14	−1	17	2–3						
7	Guarany-CM	12	3	3	6	7	18	−11	12				2–2			

Updated to match(es) played on 15 October 2011. Source: FGF (in Portuguese)
Rules for classification: 1st points; 2nd number of wins; 3rd goal difference; 4th number of goals scored; 5th head-to-head points; 6th discipline record (sent off); 7th discipline record (caution); 8th draw at FGF

== Knockout stages ==
=== Bracket ===
First round
1	1.group 1
16	5.group 2
8	2.group 3
9	4.group 2
5	best 3.
12	6.group 1
4	1.group 3
13	5.group 1
6	1.group 2
11	5.group 3
3	2nd best 3.
14	3rd best 3.
7	2.group 2
10	4.group 1
2	2.group 1
15	4.group 3

Quarter-finals

Semi-finals

Final
Juventude	2	2
Lajeadense	2	1
