= 2010 Recopa Sul-Brasileira =

The 2010 Recopa Sul-Brasileira was the 4th edition of South Brazil Super Cup. All matches of the competition were played at Estádio Antônio Vieira Ramos, which is the home stadium of Cerâmica, in Gravataí, Rio Grande do Sul. The competition started on December 3 and concluded on December 5. Four clubs participated of the competition: Cerâmica, of Rio Grande do Sul (runner-up of Copa FGF), Cerâmica were invited as Internacional B withdrew, Roma Apucarana of Paraná (champion of Campeonato Paranense Second Level), Paulista of São Paulo (champion of Copa Paulista de Futebol), and Brusque of Santa Catarina (champion of Copa Santa Catarina). Paulista sent its youth squad instead of the main team.

Cerâmica won the competition, thus preventing Santa Catarina state's fourth title in a row in the competition. That was also the first time a club not from Santa Catarina won the tournament.

== Competition format ==
The competition is a one legged knockout tournament played in two stages, semifinals and the final.

== Competition stages ==
Semi-finals
December 3 – Gravataí
(Santa Catarina (state)) Brusque	3
(São Paulo (state)) Paulista	2
December 3 - Gravataí
(Rio Grande do Sul) Cerâmica	1
(Paraná (state)) Roma Apucarana	0

Final
December 5 - Gravataí
(Santa Catarina (state)) Brusque	0
(Rio Grande do Sul) Cerâmica	1

=== Matches ===
==== Semifinals ====
December 3, 2010
15:00

Brusque	3 – 2	Paulista
	Report; Report

Estádio Antônio Vieira Ramos, Gravataí
Referee: Márcio Coruja

Brusque line-up
João Ricardo, João Sena, Thiago, João Vitor, Pedro, Cristiano, Leandro, Marcelo, Valdomiro, Paulo Cesar & Leandro Farias. Head Coach: Paulo Cesar Turra
Paulista line-up
Yuri Benhur; Luizinho, Fabrício, Rafael Thyerre & Victor Hugo; Brendon (Nathan), João Francisco, Guilherme (Renan) & Luiz Gustavo Rato; Tutinha & Ricardinho. Head Coach: Renato

December 3, 2010
17:00

Cerâmica	1 – 0	Roma
	Report

Estádio Antônio Vieira Ramos, Gravataí
Referee: André Cieslak

Cerâmica line-up
Donizetti, Djair, Sidiney, Marcão (Wagner), Índio, Robson, Liniker, Guto (Alan), Pedro, Cidinho & Rafael Paraíba. Head Coach: Luis Eduardo Lima.

Roma line-up
Spada, Cassiano, Luis Paulo, Juninho, Eurico (Fabrício), Rogério, Doriva, Alex, Fábio, Cipó (Danielzinho) e Warlley (Fernandinho). Head Coach: Richard Malka.

==== Final ====
December 5, 2010
17:00

Brusque	0 – 1	Cerâmica
	Report; Report

Estádio Antônio Vieira Ramos, Gravataí
Referee: Anderson Daronco

Brusque line-up
João Ricardo, João Sena, Thiago, João Vitor, Pedro, Cristiano, Leandro, Titê, Valdomiro, Paulo Cesar & Leandro Farias. Head Coach: Paulo Cesar Turra

Cerâmica line-up
Donizetti; Sidiney, Djair, Marcão, Robson; Pedro, Wagner (Guto), Liniker, Alan (Belo); Rafael Paraíba (Jeferson) & Cidinho Head Coach: Luis Eduardo Lima.

== Champion ==
Recopa Sul-Brasileira
2010 Winners

Cerâmica
First Title
