= Delmer (footballer) =

Brazilian footballer (born 1974)

Personal information
- Full name: Delmer Ferreira Jaines
- Date of birth: 24 July 1974 (age 52)
- Place of birth: Rosário do Sul, Brazil
- Height: 1.77 m (5 ft 10 in)
- Position: Forward

Senior career*
Years	Team	Apps	(Gls)
1994–1998	Caxias		
1998	Vila Nova		
1999	Santa Cruz-RS		
1999–2001	Caxias		
2001–2002	Ponte Preta		
2002–2003	Criciúma		
2004–2005	Académica		
2005	Goiás		
2006–2007	Criciúma		
2007	Atlético Goianiense		
2008	CRAC		
2009	São Gabriel		
2010	Garibaldi		
2010	Campo Mourão		
2010	Riopardense		
2011	Garibaldi		
2011	Guarany de Bagé		
2011	Guarany de Camaquã		
2012	Ipitanga		
2012	São Paulo-RS		
2013	Santo Ângelo		
2013	14 de Julho-SL		
- * Club domestic league appearances and goals as of 20 March 2024

Delmer Ferreira Jaines (born 24 July 1974), simply known as Delmer, is a Brazilian former professional footballer who played as a forward.

== Career ==
Forward, Delmer made history for Caxias, the club for which he played most of his career, and won the state championship in 2000, and for Criciúma, where he was Série B champion and top scorer in the state championship in 2003. He scored a total of 48 goals in 166 appearances for Criciúma and 85 goals in 274 appearances for Caxias. After retiring, he works in the textile sector in the city of Camaquã.

== Honours ==
Caxias

- Campeonato Gaúcho: 2000

Criciúma

- Campeonato Brasileiro Série B: 2002

Individual

- 2003 Campeonato Catarinense top scorer: 10 goals
