= Rafael Paraíba =

Brazilian footballer

Personal information
- Full name: Rafael Alves Targino
- Date of birth: 3 February 1989 (age 37)
- Place of birth: Pilões, Paraíba, Brazil
- Height: 1.84 m (6 ft 0 in)
- Position: Striker

Youth career
- Botafogo da Paraíba
- 2006–2007: Internacional
- 2008–2009: Grêmio

Senior career*
Years	Team	Apps	(Gls)
2009–2010	Grêmio	3	(1)
2009	→ Brasil de Pelotas (loan)	0	(0)
2009–2010	→ Hajduk Split (loan)	12	(2)
2010	Mersin İdmanyurdu	5	(2)
2010–2011	Cerâmica	18	(11)
2011	Guarany Futebol Clube		
2011	Esporte Clube Cruzeiro		
2011	SC Zofingen		
2012	Fluminense		
2013– 16	F.C. Osaka		
- * Club domestic league appearances and goals

Rafael Alves Targino (born 3 February 1989), most known as Rafael or Rafael Paraíba, is a Brazilian striker who currently a free agent.

== Biography ==
Rafael left on loan to Campeonato Gaúcho side Brasil de Pelotas in January 2009. In July 2009 he left for Croatian side Hajduk Split along with Thiaguinho. On 15 July 2010 he signed a 1-year contract with Turkish First League side Mersin İdmanyurdu, but returned to Brazil in September 2010, signed a 1-year contract with Cerâmica. He played 10 matches for the team at 2010 Copa FGF., scored 2 goals.
