= Mineiro (footballer, born 1981) =

Brazilian footballer

Personal information
- Full name: Huenes Marcelo Lemos
- Date of birth: 5 December 1981 (age 44)
- Place of birth: Iguatama, Brazil
- Height: 1.84 m (6 ft 0 in)
- Positions: Central defender; left-back

Team information
- Current team: Internacional B

Youth career
- 1998–1999: Mamoré

Senior career*
Years	Team	Apps	(Gls)
2000	América (SP)		
2001	Patrocinense		
2002–2006	ADAP		
2004	→ Operário (PR) (loan)		
2006	→ CSA (loan)	0	(0)
2006–	Internacional	6	(2)
2006–2007	→ Inter B	0	(0)
2008	→ Gamba Osaka (loan)	2	(0)
2009	→ Juventude (loan)	6	(0)
2010	→ Porto Alegre (loan)	11	(0)
2010	→ Inter B	0	(0)
2011	→ Criciúma (loan)	0	(0)
2011	→ Inter B	0	(0)
- * Club domestic league appearances and goals

Huenes Marcelo Lemos (Iguatama, born 5 December 1981), known as Mineiro, is a retired Brazilian footballer who played for Sport Club Internacional's reserves team.

== Biography ==
Born in Iguatama, Minas Gerais, Mineiro played for minor clubs in Brazil in his early career. He signed a 4 1/2-year contract with ADAP in July 2003 and loaned to CSA from April to July 2006, which he finished as the runner-up of 2006 League of Alagoas state.

=== SC Internacional ===
Mineiro then signed by Internacional in short-term contract, which he played for its B team at 2006 Copa FGF. He signed a new 5-year contract in December 2006. and played for Inter B at 2007 League of Rio Grande do Sul Second Division. He also played 6 matches at 2007 Campeonato Brasileiro Série A and 2007 Recopa Sudamericana for the first team. In the second half of 2007 season, he also played in 2007 Copa FGF.

In January 2008 he was loaned to J1 League club Gamba Osaka. and only played twice in the league, in although wore no.3 shirt. In December the club decided not to extend the loan.

In January 2009 he was loaned to Juventude, competitor of League of Rio Grande do Sul state He also played at 2009 Campeonato Brasileiro Série B.

In the next season, he was loaned to a city "rival" Porto Alegre FC in 6 months deal, for 2010 League of Rio Grande do Sul state. He returned to Inter in May. He then played for Inter B at 2010 Copa FGF and winning the cup.

He played 2 games for Inter in 2011 season before left on loan to Criciúma along with Kléber, Wagner Libano and Talles Cunha.

== Honours ==
- Recopa Sudamericana: 2007
- Pan-Pacific Championship: 2008
- AFC Champions League: 2008
- Copa FGF: 2010
