= Dênio (footballer) =

Brazilian footballer (born 1977)

Personal information
- Full name: Dênio Pereira Martins
- Date of birth: 11 August 1977 (age 49)
- Place of birth: Alegrete, Brazil
- Position: Midfielder

Team information
- Current team: Cerâmica

Senior career*
Years	Team	Apps	(Gls)
- ?
2005	Atlético Hermann Aichinger	2	(0)
2005	Caxias do Sul	0	(0)
2006	Joinville	0	(0)
2006	Garibaldi	0	(0)
2006	14 de Julho	0	(0)
2007	Guarany de Bagé	0	(0)
2007	Bagé	0	(0)
2007	Guarany de Bagé	0	(0)
2008	São José (PA)	0	(0)
2008	Glória	0	(0)
2008	Brusque	0	(0)
2009	São José (PA)	0	(0)
2009	Bagé	0	(0)
2009–2010	Brusque	0	(0)
2010	Cerâmica	0	(0)
- * Club domestic league appearances and goals

Dênio Pereira Martins (born 11 August 1977), known as just Dênio, is a Brazilian footballer who plays for Cerâmica.

== Biography ==
Born in Alegrete, Rio Grande do Sul, Dênio spent his recent career in Rio Grande do Sul and Santa Catarina state.

=== 2005 ===
After played for Santa Catarina side Atlético Hermann Aichinger at 2005 Campeonato Catarinense, 2005 Copa do Brasil and 2005 Campeonato Brasileiro Série C, he left for Caxias do Sul, which the team eliminated from 2005 Campeonato Brasileiro Série B and was preparing for 2005 Copa FGF.

=== 2006 ===
In December 2005 he returned to Santa Catarina, signed a contract with Joinville until the end of 2006 Campeonato Catarinense. In March 2006 he left for Garibaldi of Campeonato Gaúcho Segunda Divisão. In August 2006 he was signed by 14 de Julho for 2006 Copa FGF.

=== 2007 ===
In December 2006 he was signed by Guarany de Bagé, agreed a contract until the end of 2007 Campeonato Gaúcho. In April 2007 he was signed by city rival Grêmio Esportivo Bagé for 2007 Campeonato Gaúcho Segunda Divisão. On 1 October 2007 he was re-signed by Guarany de Bagé for 2007 Copa FGF.

=== 2008 ===
In January 2008 he left for Esporte Clube São José for 2008 Campeonato Gaúcho. In April 2008 he was signed by Grêmio Esportivo Glória for 2008 Campeonato Gaúcho Segunda Divisão. In June, he was signed by Brusque, winning 2008 Campeonato Catarinense Divisão Especial (Second Division) and 2008 Copa Santa Catarina with club, in although left the club as free agent before the final. He did not participated in 2008 Recopa Sul-Brasileira.

=== 2009 ===
On 1 December 2008 he left for São José again, for 2009 Campeonato Gaúcho. In April 2009 he left for Grêmio Esportivo Bagé of 2009 Campeonato Gaúcho Segunda Divisão. In September 2009 he left for Brusque again, as the team recently eliminated from 2009 Campeonato Brasileiro Série D and aimed to 2009 Copa Santa Catarina. This time the team finished as the fourth in overall league table.

=== 2010 ===
In January 2010 he extended his contract with Brusque, for 2010 Campeonato Catarinense. In March 2010 he left for Cerâmica, signed a 1-year contract. He played for the team at 2010 Campeonato Gaúcho Segunda Divisão and finished as the runner-up of 2010 Copa FGF.

== Honours ==
- Campeonato Catarinense Divisão Especial: 2008
- Copa Santa Catarina: 2008
