= Santiago (footballer, born 1976) =

Brazilian footballer

Personal information
- Full name: Elisandro Naressi Roos
- Date of birth: 4 October 1976 (age 50)
- Place of birth: Santiago, Rio Grande do Sul, Brazil
- Position: Forward

Senior career*
Years	Team	Apps	(Gls)
- ?
2005	Guarani de Venâncio Aires	0	(0)
2006	Brasil de Farroupilha	0	(0)
2006	Inter de Lages	0	(0)
2007	Santo Ângelo	0	(0)
2007	Workable	10	(0)
2008	Pelotas	0	(0)
2008	São Paulo (RS)	0	(0)
2009	Pelotas	0	(0)
2009	Grêmio Ibirubá	0	(0)
2010	Cerâmica	0	(0)
2011	Sapucaiense	0	(0)
2011	Gramadense	0	(0)
- * Club domestic league appearances and goals

Elisandro Naressi Roos known as Santiago (or Elisandro in Hong Kong) (born 4 October 1976) is a Brazilian footballer.

Santiago spent most of his career (at least from 2005 onward) in Brazilian state leagues, and a brief spell in Hong Kong

== Biography ==
=== Gaúcho and Catarinense ===
Born in Santiago, Rio Grande do Sul, Santiago spent his recent career in state competitions of Rio Grande do Sul (Gaúcho Leagues, Copa FGF) and nearby Santa Catarina state (Catarinense League).

He was the member of Guarani (of Venâncio Aires) at 2005 Campeonato Gaúcho. That season he did not score any goal and the team finished as the sixth (the last) of Group B.

In 2006, he was signed by SERC Brasil (of Farroupilha), for 2006 Campeonato Gaúcho Segunda Divisão.

In September 2006 he left for Inter de Lages, which the club finished as the fourth of Group B (total of 10 teams in 2 groups) of Campeonato Catarinense Divisão de Accesso (third division).

In 2007, he played for Santo Ângelo at 2007 Campeonato Gaúcho Segunda Divisão.

=== Hong Kong ===
In August 2007 he left for Hong Kong First Division League club Workable, which itself borrowed the licenses from "regional" team Shek Kip Mei (from Shek Kip Mei, an area/sub-district), the runner-up of 2006–07 Second Division. After goalless 11 appearances in senior competitions (including 10 starts in the first 10 round of the league), he was released.

=== return to Gaúcho lower leagues ===
He then played for Pelotas at 2008 Campeonato Gaúcho Segunda Divisão and São Paulo (RS) at 2008 Copa FGF. In February 2009 he returned to Pelotas and finished as the runner-up of 2009 Campeonato Gaúcho Segunda Divisão. He was released in September as the team did not participated in the cup. He briefly played for Grêmio Ibirubá which won 2009 Amateur League of Southern Brazil.

==== Cerâmica and Gaúcho cup ====
In February 2010 he signed a 1-year contract with Cerâmica of 2010 Campeonato Gaúcho Segunda Divisão. The team finished as the bottom of Group 6 (18 teams in stage two divided into 3 groups, Group 4 to 6) and was eliminated in the first round of 2010 Copa do Brasil. But the team finished as the runner-up of 2010 Copa FGF. He won 2010 Recopa Sul-Brasileira as unused member.

==== 2011 ====
In 2011, he was signed by Sapucaiense until the end of 2011 second division of the state. In June, he left for Gramadense, a team for the Amateur League of the state.
