= Aparecido =

Aparecido is a Brazilian surname, may refer to:

- Ademar Aparecido Xavier Júnior, commonly known as Ademar, Brazilian footballer
- César Aparecido Rodrigues, commonly known as César, Brazilian footballer born 1974
- Gilberto Aparecido da Silva, commonly known as Gilberto Silva, Brazilian footballer born 1976
- Johnathan Aparecido da Silva, commonly known as Johnathan, Brazilian footballer born 1990
- Wilson Aparecido Xavier Júnior, commonly known as Juninho, Brazilian footballer born 1984
- Leonardo José Aparecido Moura, commonly known as Leonardo, Brazilian footballer born 1986
- Ronaldo Aparecido Rodrigues, commonly known as Naldo, Brazilian footballer born 1982
- Pedro Aparecido Santana, commonly known as Pedrinho, Brazilian footballer
- Rodrigo Thiago Aparecido da Silva

As given name

- Aparecido Francisco de Lima, commonly known as Lima, Brazilian footballer born 1981
- Aparecido Donizetti, Brazilian footballer
