= Wagner da Silva =

Brazilian footballer

Wagner Silva
Personal information
- Full name: Wagner da Silva
- Date of birth: 24 September 1989 (age 37)
- Place of birth: Esteio, Brazil
- Height: 1.83 m (6 ft 0 in)
- Position: Centre-back

Team information
- Current team: Ríver

Youth career
- –2007: Porto Alegre
- 2007–2008: Benfica
- 2008–2010: Internacional

Senior career*
Years	Team	Apps	(Gls)
2010–2011	Internacional	0	(0)
2012	Sport	0	(0)
2013	Pelotas	11	(0)
2013	CSA	6	(0)
2013–2015	Mogi Mirim	27	(3)
2015	Atlético Paranaense	0	(0)
2015	Linense	0	(0)
2016	Capivariano	0	(0)
2016–2017	Vilafranquense	13	(0)
2017	Cruzeiro RS	0	(0)
2017	Novo Hamburgo	2	(0)
2018–2019	Aparecidense	0	(0)
2020–	Ríver	0	(0)
- * Club domestic league appearances and goals as of 17:46, 30 March 2020 (UTC)

Wagner da Silva (born 24 September 1989), known as Wagner Silva or simply Wagner, is a Brazilian professional footballer who plays as a centre-back for Ríver Atlético Clube.
