= Aparecido Donizetti =

Brazilian footballer (born 1973)

Personal information
- Full name: Aparecido Donizetti de Souza
- Date of birth: 10 June 1973 (age 53)
- Place of birth: Santa Rita do Passa Quatro, Brazil
- Height: 1.82 m (5 ft 11 1/2 in)
- Position: Goalkeeper

Youth career
- 1987–1993: Botafogo (SP)

Senior career*
Years	Team	Apps	(Gls)
1997	Caldense		
1999	Brasil de Pelotas		
2002–2003	Ulbra		
2004–2006	São Luiz		
2006	Metropolitano		
2006–2008	Esportivo de B.Gonçalves	15	(0)
2008–2011	Cerâmica	8	(0)
- * Club domestic league appearances and goals

Aparecido Donizetti de Souza (born 10 June 1973), sometimes known just as Donizetti or Doni, is a Brazilian footballer. He spent his recent career in Rio Grande do Sul.

His surname also misspelled as Donizette

== Biography ==
Born in Santa Rita do Passa Quatro, São Paulo state, Donizetti started his career at Botafogo (SP). He then played for Brazil regional leagues. He played for São Luiz at 2005 Campeonato Gaúcho Second Division, 2005 Copa FGF and 2006 Campeonato Gaúcho. In April 2006 he signed a 3 months contract with Metropolitano.

=== Esportivo ===
In August 2006 he returned to Rio Grande do Sul, signed a contract until end of year with Esportivo de Bento Gonçalves, for 2006 Copa FGF. He signed a new 1-year deal in December 2006.

He played for the club at 2007 Campeonato Gaúcho and was the first choice for the club at 2007 Campeonato Brasileiro Série C. He was released after 2008 Campeonato Gaúcho.

=== Cerâmica ===
In July 2008 he left for Cerâmica, which he played for the team at 2009 and 2010 Campeonato Gaúcho Segunda Divisão. He also finished as the runner-up of 2010 Copa FGF. Donizetti was suspended once after an incident in the return leg of the first round of 2010 Copa do Brasil. Donizetti finished as the runner-up of 2011 Campeonato Gaúcho Segunda Divisão and played all 8 matches for Cerâmica in 2011 Campeonato Brasileiro Série D. His contract with Cerâmica was not renewed for 2012 Campeonato Gaúcho.

== Honours ==
- Recopa Sul-Brasileira: 2010
- Campeonato Gaúcho Second Division: 2005
