= 2011 Campeonato Gaúcho =

Campeonato Gaúcho
- Season: 2011
- Champions: Internacional
- Relegated: Internacional (SM); Porto Alegre
- Série D: Cruzeiro (RS)
- Copa do Brasil: Internacional ^{LIB} Grêmio^{LIB}
- Top goalscorer: 12 goals: Leandro Damião (Internacional)
- Biggest home win: Cruzeiro(RS) 8–0 Porto Alegre (10 March)
- Biggest away win: Internacional (SM) 1–4 Internacional (26 January)
- Highest scoring: Ypiranga 5–3 Cruzeiro(RS) (2 February); Cruzeiro(RS) 8–0 Porto Alegre (10 March)
- Longest winning run: 5 games: Grêmio (23 January – 10 February )
- Longest unbeaten run: 9 games:Novo Hamburgo (22 January – 23 March)
- Longest winless run: 10 games: Porto Alegre (30 January – current )
- Longest losing run: 4 games:Porto Alegre (2 February – 10 March)

The 2011 Campeonato da Primeira Divisão de Futebol Profissional da FGF (2011 FGF First Division Professional Football Championship), better known as the 2011 Campeonato Gaúcho or Gaúcho, was the 91st edition of the top-flight football league of the Brazilian state of Rio Grande do Sul. The season began on 16 January and ended on 15 May. Internacional successfully defended in the final its 2010 title.

== Format ==
The sixteen clubs were divided into two groups that would contest in only two matches to determine which four teams from each group would qualify to the play-offs. The first stage called Taça Piratini 2012 (Piratini Cup 2012, won by Caxias) had each team from one group play only one club in the other group. In the second stage, called Taça Farroupilha 2012 (Farroupilha Cup 2012, won by Grêmio) each club within each group played one match against a club in the group. The two lowest ranked teams in the overall standings were relegated (Internacional (SM) and Porto Alegre.

== Teams ==
Club	Home city	Position in 2010
Caxias	Caxias do Sul	2nd
Cruzeiro (RS)	Porto Alegre	1st (2nd tier)
Grêmio	Porto Alegre	1st
Internacional	Porto Alegre	3rd
Internacional (SM)	Santa Maria	9th
Juventude	Caxias do Sul	13th
Lajeadense	Lajeado	2nd (2nd tier)
Novo Hamburgo	Novo Hamburgo	8th
Pelotas	Pelotas	6th
Porto Alegre	Porto Alegre	14th
Santa Cruz (RS)	Santa Cruz do Sul	10th
São José	Porto Alegre	4th
São Luiz	Ijuí	7th
Canoas^{1}	Canoas	11th
Veranópolis	Veranópolis	5th
Ypiranga	Erechim	12th

^{1}Universidade Sport Club was renamed to Canoas Sport Club on 26 November 2010.

== Taça Piratini ==
=== First stage ===
==== Group A standings ====
Pos	Team	Pld	W	D	L	GF	GA	GD	Pts	Qualification
1	Caxias	8	5	1	2	13	5	+8	16	Advances to Quarterfinals
2	Internacional	8	5	0	3	14	9	+5	15	Advances to Quarterfinals
3	São José (PA)	8	4	2	2	17	8	+9	14	Advances to Quarterfinals
4	Ypiranga	8	4	2	2	16	12	+4	14	Advances to Quarterfinals
5	Novo Hamburgo	8	3	4	1	8	4	+4	13	
6	Lajeadense	8	3	3	2	16	12	+4	12	
7	Canoas	8	2	3	3	9	10	−1	9	
8	São Luiz	8	2	1	5	15	16	−1	7	

Updated to match(es) played on 14 February. Source:
Rules for classification: 1st points; 2nd wins; 3rd goal difference; 4th goals scored; 5th red cards received; 6th yellow cards received; 7th public draw

==== Group B standings ====
Pos	Team	Pld	W	D	L	GF	GA	GD	Pts	Qualification
1	Grêmio	8	5	2	1	11	8	+3	17	Advances to Quarterfinals
2	Juventude	8	4	2	2	10	8	+2	14	Advances to Quarterfinals
3	Cruzeiro-RS	8	3	2	3	10	12	−2	11	Advances to Quarterfinals
4	Veranópolis	8	3	1	4	12	18	−6	10	Advances to Quarterfinals
5	Pelotas	8	2	2	4	11	13	−2	8	
6	Santa Cruz-RS	8	1	3	4	6	13	−7	6	
7	Internacional-SM	8	1	3	4	11	21	−10	6	
8	Porto Alegre	8	1	1	6	6	15	−9	4	

Updated to match(es) played on 14 February. Source:
Rules for classification: 1st points; 2nd wins; 3rd goal difference; 4th goals scored; 5th red cards received; 6th yellow cards received; 7th public draw

=== Playoffs ===
Quarter-finals
A1	Caxias	1
B4	Veranópolis	0
B2	Juventude	0
A3	São José (PA)	2
B1	Grêmio	5
A4	Ypiranga	0
A2	Internacional	1(4)
B3	Cruzeiro-RS	1(5)

Semi-finals
A1	Caxias	1(2)
A3	São José (PA)	1(1)
B1	Grêmio	4
B3	Cruzeiro-RS	2

Final
A1	Caxias	2(1)
B1	Grêmio	2(4)

== Taça Farroupilha ==
=== First stage ===
==== Group A standings ====
Pos	Team	Pld	W	D	L	GF	GA	GD	Pts	Qualification
1	Internacional	7	3	4	0	15	6	+9	13	Advances to Quarterfinals
2	Ypiranga	7	3	1	3	10	12	−2	10	Advances to Quarterfinals
3	Lajeadense	7	2	4	1	10	7	+3	10	Advances to Quarterfinals
4	São Luiz	7	2	4	1	8	5	+3	10	Advances to Quarterfinals
5	São José (PA)	7	2	2	3	11	11	0	8	
6	Novo Hamburgo	7	1	5	1	5	5	0	8	
7	Canoas	7	2	1	4	11	17	−6	7	
8	Caxias	7	1	3	3	11	18	−7	6	

Updated to match(es) played on 10 April. Source:
Rules for classification: 1st points; 2nd wins; 3rd goal difference; 4th goals scored; 5th red cards received; 6th yellow cards received; 7th public draw

==== Group B standings ====
Pos	Team	Pld	W	D	L	GF	GA	GD	Pts	Qualification
1	Cruzeiro-RS	7	5	0	2	19	6	+13	15	Advances to Quarterfinals
2	Juventude	7	4	2	1	17	8	+9	14	Advances to Quarterfinals
3	Grêmio	7	4	1	2	17	8	+9	13	Advances to Quarterfinals
4	Santa Cruz-RS	7	3	3	1	10	8	+2	12	Advances to Quarterfinals
5	Pelotas	7	2	2	3	10	10	0	8	
6	Veranópolis	7	2	2	3	11	12	−1	8	
7	Internacional-SM	6	1	0	5	4	21	−17	3	
8	Porto Alegre	6	0	2	4	4	19	−15	2	

Updated to match(es) played on 10 April. Source:
Rules for classification: 1st points; 2nd wins; 3rd goal difference; 4th goals scored; 5th red cards received; 6th yellow cards received; 7th public draw

=== Playoffs ===
Quarter-finals
A1	Internacional	1
B4	Santa Cruz-RS	0
B2	Juventude	3
A3	Lajeadense	0
B1	Cruzeiro-RS	2
A4	São Luiz	0
A2	Ypiranga	1 (2)
B3	Grêmio (pen.)	1 (4)

Semi-finals
B2	Juventude	1
A1	Internacional	2
B1	Cruzeiro-RS	2
B3	Grêmio	3

Final
A1	Internacional (pen.)	1 (4)
B3	Grêmio	1 (2)

== Tournament Finals ==
08 May
16:00 (GMT -03:00)

Internacional	2–3	Grêmio
Andrezinho 8'; Leandro Damião 81'		Júnior Viçosa 39', 86'; Leandro 45'

Estádio Beira-Rio
Attendance: 23,391
Referee: Jean Pierre Lima

15 May
16:00 (GMT -03:00)

Grêmio	2–3	Internacional
Lúcio 15'; Borges 80'		Leandro Damião 31'; Andrezinho 46'; D'Alessandro 74'
Penalties
Douglas (penalty scored); Willian Magrão (penalty missed); Rochemback (penalty scored); Lúcio (penalty missed); Lins (penalty scored); Rodolfo (penalty scored); Adílson (penalty missed)	4 – 5	(penalty scored) D'Alessandro; (penalty missed) Leandro Damião; (penalty missed) Kléber; (penalty scored) Oscar; (penalty scored) Bolatti; (penalty scored) Nei; (penalty scored) Zé Roberto

Estádio Olímpico Monumental
Referee: Leandro Vuaden

After 5-5 on aggregate goals, Internacional is champion by winning 5-4 on penalties.

== Overall table ==
The overall table considers only the matches played during the first stage of both Taças and will define the two teams that will be relegated to play lower levels in 2012.The Taça Champions are placed on the top of the table. The best placed team not playing in Campeonato Brasileiro Série A (Grêmio, Internacional), B or C (Caxias) will be "promoted" to 2011 Campeonato Brasileiro Série D. The best two teams not qualified to 2012 Copa Libertadores will qualify for 2012 Copa do Brasil. The final round game between Internacional-SM and Porto Alegre was cancelled after the relegation of both teams.

Pos	Team	Pld	W	D	L	GF	GA	GD	Pts	Qualification or relegation
1	Grêmio	15	9	3	3	28	16	+12	30	2012 Copa do Brasil
2	Internacional (C)	15	8	4	3	29	15	+14	28	2012 Copa Libertadores (Note: Juventude was relegated to Série D from C)
3	Juventude	15	8	4	3	27	16	+11	28	2012 Copa do Brasil and Série D
4	Cruzeiro-RS	15	8	2	5	29	18	+11	26	Série D
5	Ypiranga	15	7	3	5	26	24	+2	24	
6	São José (PA)	15	6	4	5	28	18	+10	22	
7	Caxias	15	6	4	5	24	23	+1	22	
8	Lajeadense	15	5	7	3	26	19	+7	22	
9	Novo Hamburgo	15	4	9	2	13	9	+4	21	
10	Veranópolis	15	5	3	7	23	30	−7	18	
11	Santa Cruz-RS	15	4	6	5	16	21	−5	18	
12	São Luiz	15	4	5	6	23	21	+2	17	
13	Pelotas	15	4	4	7	21	23	−2	16	
14	Canoas	15	4	4	7	20	27	−7	16	
15	Internacional-SM (R)	14	2	3	9	15	42	−27	9	Relegation to 2012 2ª divisão
16	Porto Alegre (R)	14	1	3	10	10	34	−24	6	Relegation to 2012 2ª divisão

Updated to match(es) played on 10 April. Source: (in Portuguese)
Rules for classification: 1st points; 2nd wins; 3rd goal difference; 4th goals scored; 5th red cards received; 6th yellow cards received; 7th public draw
(C) Champions; (R) Relegated

== See also ==
- 2011 Copa FGF
