= Djair (footballer, born 1976) =

Brazilian footballer

Personal information
- Full name: Djair Baptista Machado
- Date of birth: 24 December 1976 (age 49)
- Place of birth: Caxias do Sul, Brazil
- Height: 1.87 m (6 ft 1 1/2 in)
- Positions: Centre-back; defensive midfielder

Senior career*
Years	Team	Apps	(Gls)
1997–1999	Grêmio	30	(0)
2000	Juventude		
2001	Rio Branco		
2001	Belenenses	2	(0)
2002	RS Futebol Clube		
2003	Hapoel Kfar Saba		
2004	?		
2005	São Raimundo (AM)	19	(0)
2005	Nacional (AM)	4	(0)
2006	Ituano	0	(0)
2006	São Raimundo (AM)	6	(0)
2007	Porto Alegre	0	(0)
2007	Sampaio Corrêa	4	(0)
2007–2009	Eastern		
2010	Internacional (SM)	0	(0)
2010–2012	Cerâmica	29	(0)
- * Club domestic league appearances and goals

Djair Baptista Machado known as Djair (or Machado in Hong Kong) (born 24 December 1976) is a former Brazilian footballer.

His given name also misspelled as Dejair.

== Biography ==
Born in Caxias do Sul, Rio Grande do Sul, Djair started his career at Grêmio. In 2000, he left for Juventude and played once in 2000 Copa do Brasil. He played a half season in Portugal for Belenenses in 2001, and left the club in mid of 2001–02 Primeira Liga. In 2003, he left for Israeli side Hapoel Kfar Saba from RS Futebol Clube.

=== São Raimundo ===
In 2005, he left for São Raimundo (AM), signed a contract until the end of 2005 Campeonato Amazonense. He extended his contract until September in May, for 2005 Campeonato Brasileiro Série B. He played 19 matches in Série B, only missed round 9 and round 19. After Série B had ended, he was signed by city rival Nacional (AM) for 2005 Campeonato Brasileiro Série C in September, which the team finished as the losing quarter-finalists.

In December 2005, he signed a 1-year deal with Ituano, the league rival (Série B) of São Raimundo. After the end of 2006 Campeonato Paulista, he returned to São Raimundo for 2006 Campeonato Brasileiro Série B in May 2006. He made his debut on 20 May (round 6), however he was injured at that match and missed more than 3 months. He returned to starting line-up on 12 September (round 23) but since then failed to enter starting line-up. The team finished as the second from the bottom and relegated.

=== Porto Alegre & Sampaio Corrêa ===
In February 2007 he returned to Rio Grande do Sul, signed a contract with Porto Alegre Futebol Clube until the end of Campeonato Gaúcho Segunda Divisão .

In August, he left for Sampaio Corrêa, for 2007 Campeonato Brasileiro Série C second stage. The team finished as the third of Group 17 (there was 8 groups in 2nd stage, namely Group 17 to 24 with a total of 32 teams), failed to enter round of 16 (third stage).

=== Eastern ===
In September 2007 he left for Hong Kong First Division League club Eastern. Under Brazilian coach Casemiro Mior, he won Hong Kong Senior Shield with team.

Despite Eastern released Mior and several foreigner due to financial decision at the end of season, Djair was offered a new deal, along with Picoli. He played for the club at 2009 AFC Cup (finished as losing side in group stage) and was selected to Hong Kong League Selection for 2009 Lunar New Year Cup, which losing to united team of South China–Pegasus and Suwon Bluewings (after penalty shootout). Eastern finished as the 9th (out of 13 teams).

Djair returned to Brazil after Eastern withdrew from the top division in 2009 and applied to play in 2009–10 Third Division "A", the non-professional league.

=== Late career ===
In December 2009 he returned to Rio Grande do Sul. He signed a contract until the end of 2010 Campeonato Gaúcho with Internacional de Santa Maria. In June 2010 he signed a 1-year deal with Campeonato Gaúcho Segunda Divisão club Cerâmica. He finished as the runner-up at 2010 Copa FGF.

== Honours ==
National

- Copa do Brasil: 1997
- Hong Kong Senior Shield: 2008

Regional

- Recopa Sul-Brasileira: 2010
