= Júnior Silva =

Brazilian footballer

Personal information
- Full name: Ananias Djalma da Silva Júnior
- Date of birth: 17 April 1990 (age 36)
- Height: 1.85 m (6 ft 1 in)
- Positions: Defender; midfielder

Senior career*
Years	Team	Apps	(Gls)
2011	Pelotas		
2011	Porto Alegre	0	(0)
2012	Glória		
2014	Rondonópolis		
2016	Riograndense		
2016	Hercílio Luz	0	(0)
- * Club domestic league appearances and goals

Ananias Djalma da Silva Júnior (born 17 April 1990), commonly known as Júnior Silva, is a former Brazilian footballer.

== Career statistics ==
=== Club ===
Club	Season	League			State League		Cup		Other		Total	
Club	Season	Division	Apps	Goals	Apps	Goals	Apps	Goals	Apps	Goals	Apps	Goals
Porto Alegre	2011	–			6 (Note: Appearances in the Campeonato Gaúcho)	0	0	0	0	0	6	0
Hercílio Luz	2016	–			1 (Note: Appearances in the Campeonato Catarinense Divisão Especial)	0	0	0	0	0	1	0
Career total			0	0	7	0	0	0	0	0	7	0
