= Marcão (footballer, born 1990) =

Brazilian footballer

Personal information
- Full name: Marcus Vinícius Lima da Silva
- Date of birth: 26 April 1990 (age 36)
- Place of birth: Curitiba, Brazil
- Position: Centre-back

Team information
- Current team: Richmond SC
- Number: 3

Youth career
- 2007–2009: Atlético Paranaense

Senior career*
Years	Team	Apps	(Gls)
2009–2011	Marília	3	(0)
2011–2013	Cerâmica	43	(2)
2016	Rio Branco	10	(0)
2016–2017	Maringá	3	(0)
2017	PSTC	11	(4)
2017–2018	Than Quang Ninh	2	(0)
2019–2021	Atibaia	11	(1)
2021	Novo Hamburgo	11	(1)
2021	Penapolense	2	(0)
- * Club domestic league appearances and goals as of 23:16, 29 November 2021 (UTC)

Marcus Vinícius Lima da Silva, known as Marcão (literally Marcus the elder) or Marcus Vinícius (born 26 April 1990), is a Brazilian footballer who plays for Richmond SC.

== Biography ==
Born in Curitiba, Paraná, Marcão started his career at Atlético Paranaense. He signed a 3-year contract in April 2007. In May 2009 he left for Marília in 3-year contract. He played once in 2009 Campeonato Brasileiro Série C, at that time known as Marcus Vinícius on 26 July 2009.

After played for the team at 2010 Campeonato Paulista Série A2, he was signed by Campeonato Gaúcho Segunda Divisão club Cerâmica. He finished as the runner-up of 2010 Copa FGF.
