= Sidney (footballer, born 1972) =

Brazilian footballer

Personal information
- Full name: Sidney da Silva Souza
- Date of birth: 12 September 1972 (age 54)
- Place of birth: ?, Brazil
- Height: 1.80 m (5 ft 11 in)
- Position: Defensive midfielder

Team information
- Current team: Cerâmica

Senior career*
Years	Team	Apps	(Gls)
- ?
2005	Pelotas		
2005–2006	Novo Hamburgo	8	(0)
2006	Brasil de Farroupilha		
2006–2007	Ulbra		
2007	→ Ulbra Ji-Paraná (loan)		
2007–2009	Brasil de Farroupilha		
2009	Esportivo de B.Gonçalves		
2009–	Cerâmica		
- * Club domestic league appearances and goals

Sidney da Silva Souza known as Sidney (born 12 September 1972) is a Brazilian footballer who plays for Cerâmica. Sidney spent most of his career in Rio Grande do Sul.

== Biography ==
After played for Pelotas at 2005 Campeonato Gaúcho, he was signed by Novo Hamburgo and played at 2005 Campeonato Brasileiro Série C. His contract was extended in January 2006 and played at 2006 Campeonato Gaúcho. In March 2006 he was signed by Brasil de Farroupilha of Campeonato Gaúcho Second Division and released in June. In June 2006 he signed a 1-year contract with Ulbra, for 2006 Copa FGF. in April 2007 he was signed by Ulbra Ji-Paraná in 3 months deal. He then played for Brasil de Farroupilha at 2007 Copa FGF. In February 2008 he signed a new 1 1/2-year contract with Brasil de Farroupilha. After played for the club at 2008 Campeonato Gaúcho Segunda Divisão and 2008 Copa FGF, he was signed by Esportivo de Bento Gonçalves in February 2009. After 2009 Campeonato Gaúcho, he was signed by Cerâmica in 1-year deal. He played for the club at 2009 Copa FGF and 2010 Campeonato Gaúcho. In September 2010 he signed a new 1-year deal and finished as the runner-up of 2010 Copa FGF. He was sent off in the first leg on the final.
