= Muriel (footballer) =

Brazilian footballer (born 1987)

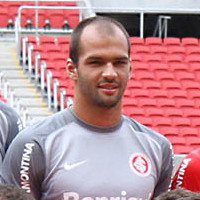
- Muriel with Internacional in 2014

Personal information
- Full name: Muriel Gustavo Becker
- Date of birth: 14 February 1987 (age 39)
- Place of birth: Novo Hamburgo, Brazil
- Height: 1.90 m (6 ft 3 in)
- Position: Goalkeeper

Team information
- Current team: Náutico
- Number: 1

Youth career
- 2003–2006: Internacional

Senior career*
Years	Team	Apps	(Gls)
2007–2017	Internacional	178	(0)
2009	→ Caxias (loan)	18	(0)
2009	→ Portuguesa (loan)	16	(0)
2016	→ Bahia (loan)	22	(0)
2017–2018	CF Os Belenenses	17	(0)
2018–2019	Belenenses SAD	32	(0)
2019–2022	Fluminense	57	(0)
2022–2024	AEL Limassol	35	(0)
2024	Vitória	9	(0)
2025–	Náutico	68	(0)
- * Club domestic league appearances and goals as of 18 November 2026

Muriel Gustavo Becker (born 14 February 1987), simply known as Muriel, is a Brazilian professional footballer who plays as a goalkeeper for Náutico.

== Career ==
=== Internacional ===
In 2009, Muriel was loaned by Internacional to Caxias and Portuguesa. He won the 2010 Copa FGF with the Internacional B side.

On 23 May 2011, he joined Série B club Portuguesa for a second loan spell, but the contract was rescinded.

In July 2016, he was loaned to another second-tier team, Bahia.

=== Belenenses / Belenenses SAD ===
On 13 June 2017, Muriel moved abroad for the first time, signing for C.F. Os Belenenses of the Portuguese Primeira Liga on a two-year deal. Sixteen days later he made his debut in the first round of the Taça da Liga in a 1–0 home loss to Real SC, though the result was revoked in his team's favour as the opponents had fielded the suspended Abou Touré. In his first league game, the side from Lisbon lost by the same score at Rio Ave F.C. on 7 August.

In Muriel's second season in Belém, with the team now spun off as Belenenses SAD, he was an ever-present for the first 32 league matches, including a 2–0 home win over eventual champions S.L. Benfica on 27 October 2018. In his final game for the club on 5 May 2019, he gifted city rivals Sporting CP the opening goal by giving the ball to Raphinha, he then fouled the same played in the 21st minute and was sent off in an 8–1 loss.

=== Fluminense ===
On 5 July 2019, Muriel returned to Brazil's top flight, signing a 3 1/2-year deal with Fluminense. He made his debut on 24 July in the last 16 first leg of the 2019 Copa Sudamericana, a 2–1 win away to Peñarol. Four days later, in his first Série A match for the club, he made an error in a 2–1 home loss to São Paulo at the Maracanã Stadium.

In his debut Campeonato Carioca season, Becker reached the final with Fluminense, losing 3–1 on aggregate to rivals Flamengo in July 2020.

== Style of play ==
Becker is known for his speed and timing when rushing off his line.

== Personal life ==
Muriel's younger brother, Alisson Becker, is also a professional footballer and a goalkeeper for Premier League club Liverpool and the Brazil national team. He was his teammate at Internacional.

== Career statistics ==
=== Club ===
As of 9 November 2021.

Appearances and goals by club, season and competition
Club	Season	League			State League		Cup		Continental		Other		Total	
Club	Season	Division	Apps	Goals	Apps	Goals	Apps	Goals	Apps	Goals	Apps	Goals	Apps	Goals
Internacional	2010	Série A	1	0	3 (Note: Appearance(s) in Campeonato Gaúcho.)	0	—		0	0	—		4	0
Internacional	2011	Série A	34	0	6	0	—		0	0	2 (Note: Appearance(s) in Recopa Sudamericana.)	0	42	0
Internacional	2012	Série A	38	0	18	0	—		10 (Note: Appearance(s) in Copa Libertadores.)	0	—		66	0
Internacional	2013	Série A	32	0	17	0	7	0	—		—		56	0
Internacional	2014	Série A	1	0	7	0	0	0	0	0	—		8	0
Internacional	2015	Série A	13	0	4	0	0	0	0	0	—		17	0
Internacional	2016	Série A	3	0	1	0	—		—		1 (Note: Appearance(s) in Primeira Liga.)	0	5	0
Internacional	Total		122	0	56	0	7	0	10	0	6	0	198	0
Caxias (loan)	2009	Série C	10	0	8	0	—		—		—		18	0
Portuguesa (loan)	2009	Série B	16	0	—		—		—		—		16	0
Bahia (loan)	2016	Série B	22	0	—		—		—		—		22	0
CF Os Belenenses	2017–18	Primeira Liga	17	0	—		1	0	—		—		18	0
Belenenses SAD	2018–19	Primeira Liga	32	0	—		1	0	—		—		33	0
Fluminense	2019	Série A	21	0	—		—		4 (Note: Appearance(s) in Copa Sudamericana.)	0	—		25	0
Fluminense	2020	Série A	19	0	14	0	6	0	2	0	—		41	0
Fluminense	2021	Série A	2	0	0	0	0	0	0	0	—		2	0
Fluminense	Total		42	0	14	0	6	0	6	0	—		68	0
Career total			261	0	78	0	15	0	16	0	3	0	373	0

== Honours ==
Individual

- Primeira Liga Goalkeeper of the Month: December 2018
