= Romário (footballer, born June 1992) =

Brazilian footballer

Personal information
- Full name: Romário Leiria de Moura
- Date of birth: 28 June 1992 (age 34)
- Place of birth: Porto Alegre, Brazil
- Height: 1.84 m (6 ft 0 in)
- Position: Centre back

Team information
- Current team: Veranópolis

Youth career
- Internacional

Senior career*
Years	Team	Apps	(Gls)
2011–2015	Internacional	0	(0)
2014	→ Náutico (loan)	0	(0)
2014	→ Novo Hamburgo (loan)	0	(0)
2015	→ Paysandu (loan)	7	(0)
2015–2016	Marítimo	9	(0)
2016–2017	São Paulo	0	(0)
2018	Boa Esporte	0	(0)
2019	Metropolitano	0	(0)
2019	Afturelding	4	(0)
2020–	Veranópolis	0	(0)

International career
2009	Brazil U-17	3	(0)
2011	Brazil U-20	6	(0)
- * Club domestic league appearances and goals as of 22:47, 29 March 2020 (UTC)

Romário Leiria de Moura or simply Romário (born 28 June 1992 in Porto Alegre) is a Brazilian footballer who plays as a defender for Veranópolis.

== Honours ==
Internacional

- Campeonato Gaúcho: 2012, 2013

=== International ===
==== Brazil U20 ====
- 2011 South American Youth Championship
- FIFA U-20 World Cup (1): 2011
