= Associação Esportiva Social e Recreativa Riopardense =

Riopardense
- Full name: Associação Esportiva Social e Recreativa Riopardense
- Founded: July 27, 2009
- Ground: Estádio Municipal Amaro Cassep, Rio Pardo, Rio Grande do Sul state, Brazil
- Capacity: 1,500
Home colours	Away colours

Associação Esportiva Social e Recreativa Riopardense, commonly known as Riopardense, is a Brazilian football club based in Rio Pardo, Rio Grande do Sul state.

== History ==
The club was founded on July 27, 2009. They competed in the Copa FGF in 2010, when they were eliminated in the First Stage of the competition.

== Stadium ==
Associação Esportiva Social e Recreativa Riopardense play their home games at Estádio Municipal Amaro Cassep. The stadium has a maximum capacity of 1,500 people.
