= Juventus Atlético Clube =

Juventus
- Full name: Juventus Atlético Clube
- Founded: March 12, 1951
- Ground: Estádio Municipal Carlos Denardin, Santa Rosa, Rio Grande do Sul state, Brazil
- Capacity: 3,500
Home colors	Away colors

Juventus Atlético Clube, commonly known as Juventus, is a Brazilian football club based in Santa Rosa, Rio Grande do Sul state.

== History ==
The club was founded on March 12, 1951. The club closed its football department in the 1970s, only reopening it in 1997 to compete in the Campeonato Gaúcho Second Level.

== Stadium ==
Juventus Atlético Clube play their home games at Estádio Municipal Carlos Denardin. The stadium has a maximum capacity of 3,500 people.
