= Daniel (footballer, born 1990) =

Brazilian footballer

Personal information
- Full name: Daniel Henrique Souza de Jesus
- Date of birth: 14 September 1990 (age 36)
- Place of birth: Capão da Canoa, Brazil
- Height: 1.78 m (5 ft 10 in)
- Position: Right back

Team information
- Current team: HB Køge
- Number: 14

Youth career
- 2007–2008: Internacional

Senior career*
Years	Team	Apps	(Gls)
2008–2011	Internacional	11	(0)
2009	→ Caxias (loan)	-	(-)
2009–2010	→ Náutico (loan)	-	(-)
2011	→ Avaí (loan)		
2012–2013	São Caetano		
2012–2013	→ Atlético Paranaense (loan)		
2014–	HB Køge	0	(0)
- * Club domestic league appearances and goals as of 31 December 2009

Daniel Henrique Souza de Jesus, usually known as Daniel (born 14 September 1990 in Capão da Canoa, Rio Grande do Sul), is a Brazilian football right back. He currently plays for HB Køge in Danish 1st Division.
