= Rodolfo (footballer, born 1991) =

Brazilian footballer

Personal information
- Full name: Rodolfo Alves de Melo
- Date of birth: 19 March 1991 (age 35)
- Place of birth: Santos, Brazil
- Height: 1.89 m (6 ft 2 1/2 in)
- Position: Goalkeeper

Team information
- Current team: Oeste (on loan from Fluminense)

Youth career
- São Paulo
- 2009: Paraná
- 2010: Internacional
- 2011: Atlético Paranaense

Senior career*
Years	Team	Apps	(Gls)
2009	Paraná	3	(0)
2012–2017	Atlético Paranaense	35	(0)
2015	→ Ferroviária (loan)	17	(0)
2016	→ Ferroviária (loan)	13	(0)
2016–2018	Oeste	52	(0)
2018	→ Fluminense (loan)	5	(0)
2019–	Fluminense	20	(0)
2021–	→ Oeste (loan)	23	(0)
- * Club domestic league appearances and goals as of 15:38, 10 November 2021 (UTC)

Rodolfo Alves de Melo (born 19 March 1991), simply known as Rodolfo, is a Brazilian footballer who plays as a goalkeeper for Oeste, on loan from Fluminense.

== Club career ==
Born in Santos, São Paulo, Rodolfo joined Atlético Paranaense's youth setup in 2011, aged 20. He was promoted to the main squad in the following year, being one of the five goalkeepers in the roster.

Rodolfo made his professional debut on 19 May 2012, starting in a 4–1 away win against Joinville, for the Série B championship. He appeared in three further matches during the campaign, which ended in promotion.

In July 2012, Rodolfo was suspended for 30 days after failing a doping exam, being later revealed that due to the use of cocaine. He later admitted being a drug dependent, and was interned in a rehabilitation clinic.

Rodolfo was caught in a second exam in August 2012. After being suspended from football for two years, he returned to action in September 2013, however.

After returning from his ban, Rodolfo was included in Furacão's under-23 squad, being appointed captain of the side in January 2014. On 2 December of that year, he was loaned to Ferroviária until the end of Campeonato Paulista Série A2.

Rodolfo was an undisputed starter for Ferrinha, which returned to São Paulo's top level after a 19-year absence. On 7 October 2015 he signed a new contract with Atlético, running until 2018.

== Honours ==
Ferroviária

- Campeonato Paulista Série A2: 2015
