= Luís Fernando (footballer, born 1983) =

Brazilian footballer

Personal information
- Full name: Luís Fernando Rodrigues dos Santos
- Date of birth: 21 December 1983 (age 42)
- Place of birth: Santana do Livramento, Brazil
- Height: 1.80 m (5 ft 11 in)
- Position: Striker

Senior career*
Years	Team	Apps	(Gls)
2001–2002	Artigas de Rivera		
2003	Bella Vista	40	(18)
2004	Deportes Concepción	6	(15)
2005	Guarani	24	(24)
2005	FC Ascona	9	(20)
2006–2007	AC Lugano	42	(18)
2007–2008	SC Kriens	23	(11)
2010	Nacional Atlético Clube		
2017–2018	FC Agno		
- * Club domestic league appearances and goals

Luís Fernando Rodrigues dos Santos (born 21 December 1983), known as his given name Luís Fernando or Luizao, is a former Brazilian footballer.

== Football career ==
=== South America ===
He started his professional career at Bella Vista of Primera División Uruguaya. He then moved to Deportes Concepción of Liga Chilena de Fútbol: Primera B, before back to Brazil for Guarani of Campeonato Brasileiro Série B.

=== Switzerland ===
He signed by Swiss 2. Liga interregional (4th division) club FC Ascona on 31 August 2005, just few days he was signed by Grêmio Esportivo Glória.

He scored 14 goals in 9 games, and AC Lugano of Swiss Challenge League, signed him on 22 January 2006.

On 25 September 2007, he moved to SC Kriens.
