= Juliano Pacheco =

Brazilian footballer

Personal information
- Full name: Juliano Real Pacheco
- Date of birth: 6 April 1990 (age 36)
- Place of birth: Pelotas, Brazil
- Height: 1.83 m (6 ft 0 in)
- Position: Defensive midfielder

Youth career
- 2001–2010: Internacional

Senior career*
Years	Team	Apps	(Gls)
2010–2012	Internacional	6	(0)
2012	→ Goiás (loan)	4	(0)
2013–2015	Goiás	53	(0)
2016	Fortaleza	34	(0)
2017	Figueirense	19	(0)
2018	CRB	10	(0)
2019–2021	Caxias	59	(0)
2019	→ São Bento (loan)	6	(0)
2021	Brusque	2	(0)
2022	Brasil de Pelotas	10	(0)
2022	Amazonas		
- * Club domestic league appearances and goals

Juliano Real Pacheco (born 6 April 1990), simply known as Juliano Pacheco, is a Brazilian former professional footballer who played as a defensive midfielder.

== Career ==
Born in Pelotas, Rio Grande do Sul, Juliano graduated with Internacional's youth setup. On 11 December 2011, after making his senior debuts in the year's Campeonato Gaúcho, he was loaned to Goiás for a year.

Juliano made his professional debut on 3 August 2012, coming on as a late substitute for Walter in a 6–0 away routing of Ipatinga for the Série B championship. Despite appearing rarely, he signed permanently with the club in December.

On 15 May 2014 Juliano made his Série A debut, starting in a 2–0 home win against Botafogo.
