= Elton (footballer, born 1990) =

Brazilian footballer

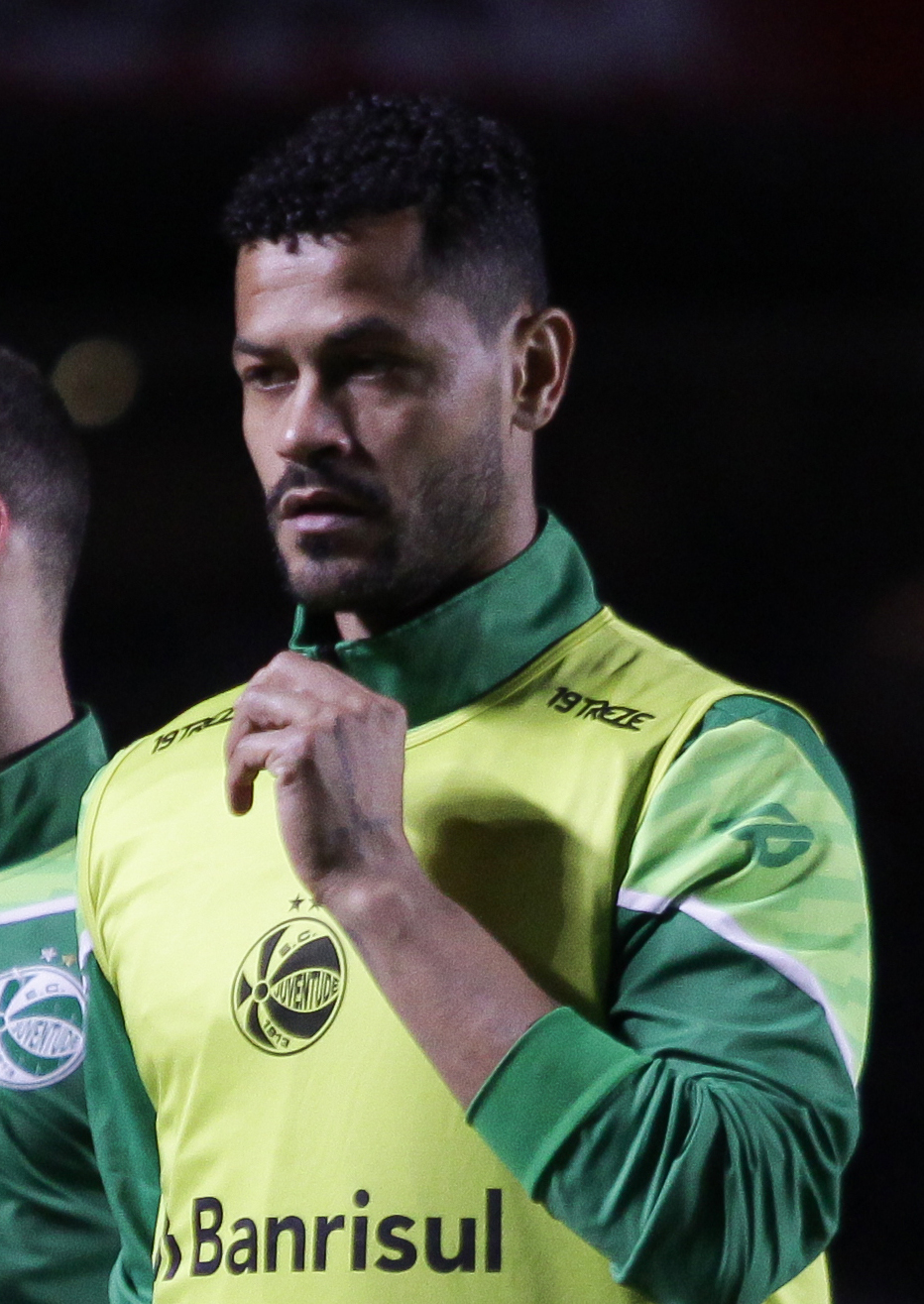

Personal information
- Full name: Elton Junior Melo Ataíde
- Date of birth: 17 March 1990 (age 36)
- Place of birth: Teodoro Sampaio, Brazil
- Height: 1.80 m (5 ft 11 in)
- Position: Defensive midfielder

Team information
- Current team: Náutico

Youth career
- Internacional

Senior career*
Years	Team	Apps	(Gls)
2010–2015	Internacional	70	(4)
2013	→ Criciúma (loan)	32	(2)
2014	→ Paraná (loan)	6	(0)
2014–2015	→ Ponte Preta (loan)	38	(2)
2016–2017	Ponte Preta	52	(3)
2018–2021	Bahia	62	(2)
2021	→ Juventude (loan)	19	(0)
2022–2023	Juventude	25	(0)
2023	→ Tombense (loan)	5	(0)
2023–	Náutico	9	(0)
- * Club domestic league appearances and goals as of 26 August 2023

Elton Junior Melo Ataíde (born 17 March 1990), simply known as Elton, is a Brazilian footballer who plays as a defensive midfielder for Náutico.

== Career statistics ==
As of 25 October 2021

Club	Season	League			State League		Cup		Conmebol		Other		Total	
Club	Season	Division	Apps	Goals	Apps	Goals	Apps	Goals	Apps	Goals	Apps	Goals	Apps	Goals
Internacional	2010	Série A	0	0	3	1	—		—		—		3	1
Internacional	2011	Série A	17	0	3	0	—		—		2 (Note: All appearance(s) in Recopa Sudamericana)	0	22	0
Internacional	2012	Série A	26	1	14	2	—		4	0	—		44	3
Internacional	2013	Série A	0	0	7	0	—		—		—		7	0
Internacional	Subtotal		43	1	27	3	—		4	0	2	0	76	4
Criciúma (loan)	2013	Série A	23	1	9	1	6	1	1 (Note: All appearance(s) in Copa Sudamericana)	0	—		39	3
Paraná (loan)	2014	Série B	0	0	6	0	1	0	—		—		7	0
Ponte Preta	2014	Série B	18	1	—		—		—		—		18	1
Ponte Preta	2015	Série A	20	1	—		1	0	1	0	—		22	1
Ponte Preta	2016	Série A	6	0	9	2	4	0	—		—		19	2
Ponte Preta	2017	Série A	28	1	9	0	0	0	6	1	—		43	2
Ponte Preta	Subtotal		72	3	18	2	5	0	7	1	—		102	6
Bahia	2018	Série A	28	0	10	2	4	0	6	1	9 (Note: All appearance(s) in Copa do Nordeste)	0	57	3
Bahia	2019	Série A	9	0	5	0	7	1	0	0	3	0	24	1
Bahia	2020	Série A	5	0	5	0	0	0	0	0	2	0	12	0
Bahia	Subtotal		42	0	20	2	11	1	6	1	14	0	93	4
Juventude (loan)	2021	Série A	10	0	9	0	2	0	—		—		21	0
Career total			190	5	89	8	25	2	18	2	16	0	338	17
