= 2011 Campeonato Brasileiro Série D =

Campeonato Brasileiro de Clubes da Série D
- Season: 2011
- Champions: Tupi
- Promoted: Tupi; Santa Cruz; Cuiabá; Oeste
- Biggest home win: Plácido de Castro 9–1 Vila Aurora (10 September 2011)
- Biggest away win: São Mateus 1–4 Audax Rio (30 Jul); Vitória da Conquista 0–3 Bahia de Feira (24 Jul)
- Highest scoring: Plácido de Castro 9–1 Vila Aurora (10 September 2011)

In 2011, the Campeonato Brasileiro Série D, the fourth division of the Brazilian League, will be contested for the third time in history, during 18 July and 13 November. It will be contested by 40 clubs, four of which will eventually qualify to the Campeonato Brasileiro Série C to be contested in 2012.

== Competition format ==
The 40 teams are divided in eight groups of 5, playing within them in a double round-robin format. The two best ranked in each group at the end of 10 rounds will qualify to the Second Stage, which will be played in home-and-away system. Winners advance to Third Stage. The quarterfinal winners will be promoted to the Série C 2012. As there is no Série E, or fifth division, technically there will be no relegation. However, teams who were not promoted will have to re-qualify for Série D 2012 through their respective state leagues.
The competition can also be considered as 4 mini-tournaments (Group 1+2;3+4;5+6;7+8) because according to the playoff-structure, exactly one team of each "mini-tournament" will be promoted.

== Participating teams ==
State	Team	Qualification method
(Acre (state)) Acre; 1 berth	Plácido de Castro	2011 Campeonato Acreano best record (RU)
(Alagoas) Alagoas; 1 berth	Coruripe	2011 Campeonato Alagoano best record (RU)
(Amapá) Amapá; 1 berth	Trem	2010 Campeonato Amapaense champions
(Amazonas (Brazilian state)) Amazonas; 1+1 ^{Note RR}berth	Penarol	2010 Campeonato Amazonense champions
(Amazonas (Brazilian state)) Amazonas; 1+1 ^{Note RR}berth	Nacional	Best Amazonas team in CBF Club Ranking ^{Note AM}
(Bahia) Bahia; 2 berths	Bahia de Feira	2011 Campeonato Baiano champions
(Bahia) Bahia; 2 berths	Vitória da Conquista	2010 Copa Governador do Estado da Bahia champions
(Ceará) Ceará; 1 berth	Guarani de Juazeiro	2011 Campeonato Cearense best record (RU)
(Federal District (Brazil)) Distrito Federal; 1 + 1 berth	Formosa	2011 Campeonato Brasiliense best record (3rd)
(Federal District (Brazil)) Distrito Federal; 1 + 1 berth	Gama	Relegated from 2010 Série C (19th place)
(Espírito Santo) Espírito Santo; 1 berth	São Mateus	2011 Campeonato Capixaba champions
(Goiás) Goiás; 2 berths	Anapolina	2011 Campeonato Goiano best record(4th)
(Goiás) Goiás; 2 berths	Itumbiara	2010 Campeonato Goiano best placed non 2011 Campeonato Goiano 1ª Divisão team^{Note GO}
(Maranhão) Maranhão; 1 berth	Sampaio Corrêa	2010 Campeonato Maranhense champions
(Mato Grosso) Mato Grosso; 1+1 berth ^{Note RO}	Cuiabá	2011 Campeonato Matogrossense champions
(Mato Grosso) Mato Grosso; 1+1 berth ^{Note RO}	Vila Aurora	2011 Campeonato Matogrossense 4th ^{Note MT}
(Mato Grosso do Sul) Mato Grosso do Sul; 1 berth	CENE	2010 Copa MS champions
(Minas Gerais) Minas Gerais; 2 berths	Villa Nova	2011 Campeonato Mineiro 2nd best record (4th)
(Minas Gerais) Minas Gerais; 2 berths	Tupi	2011 Campeonato Mineiro 3rd^{Note MG} best record (5th)
(Pará) Pará; 1 + 1 berth	Independente	2011 Campeonato Paraense champions
(Pará) Pará; 1 + 1 berth	São Raimundo (PA)	Relegated from 2010 Série C (20th place)
(Paraíba) Paraíba; 1 berth	Treze	2011 Campeonato Paraibano best record
(Paraná (state)) Paraná; 2 berths	Operário	2011 Campeonato Paranaense best record (3rd)
(Paraná (state)) Paraná; 2 berths	Cianorte	2011 Campeonato Paranaense 2nd best record (4th)
(Pernambuco) Pernambuco; 2 berths	Santa Cruz	2011 Campeonato Pernambucano best first stage record (2nd)
(Pernambuco) Pernambuco; 2 berths	Porto	2011 Campeonato Pernambucano 2nd best first stage record (3rd)
(Piauí) Piauí; 1 berth	Comercial(PI)	2011 Campeonato Piauiense 1º turno champions
(Rio de Janeiro (state)) Rio de Janeiro; 2 berths	Volta Redonda	2011 Campeonato Carioca 6th^{Note RJ} best record (12th)
(Rio de Janeiro (state)) Rio de Janeiro; 2 berths	Audax Rio	2010 Copa Rio champions
(Rio Grande do Norte) Rio Grande do Norte; 1 + 1 berth	Sport Club Santa Cruz	2011 Campeonato Potiguar best record
(Rio Grande do Norte) Rio Grande do Norte; 1 + 1 berth	Alecrim	Relegated from 2010 Série C (17th place)
(Rio Grande do Sul) Rio Grande do Sul; 2 + 1 berths	Cruzeiro (PA)	2011 Campeonato Gaúcho best record (4th)
(Rio Grande do Sul) Rio Grande do Sul; 2 + 1 berths	Cerâmica	2010 Copa Enio Costamilan runners
(Rio Grande do Sul) Rio Grande do Sul; 2 + 1 berths	Juventude	Relegated from 2010 Série C (18th place)
Rondônia (1 berth)	No representative^{Note RO}	(2011 Campeonato Rondoniense champions)
Roraima (1 berth)	No representative^{Note RR}	(2011 Campeonato Roraimense champions)
(São Paulo (state)) São Paulo; 2 berths	Oeste	2011 Campeonato Paulista best record (6th)
(São Paulo (state)) São Paulo; 2 berths	Mirassol	2011 Campeonato Paulista 2nd best record (7th)
(Santa Catarina (state)) Santa Catarina; 2 berths	Metropolitano	2010 Copa Santa Catarina best record (7th)
(Santa Catarina (state)) Santa Catarina; 2 berths	Brusque	2011 Campeonato Catarinense best record (6th)
(Sergipe) Sergipe; 1 berth	River Plate	2011 Campeonato Sergipano champions
Tocantins; 1 berth	Tocantinópolis	2010 Campeonato Tocantinense 2nd ^{Note TO} best record (3rd)

Notes:
(Amazonas (Brazilian state)) Amazonas:
After Amazonas got an additional berth (see ^{Note RO}) Amazonas FA decided that the best placed team in CBF's ranking (Nacional) is qualified.
Fast Clube (2010 Campeonato Amazonense runners) appealed to the Amazonas Court of Sporting Justice (TJD), and on 7 July 2011, it was announced that Fast Clube's appeal was rejected.
On 12 July the Court of the State of Amazonas granted an injunction in favor of the fan Cavalcante Marco Tulio Costa, as a fan against the FAF and CBF. In the injunction, the FAF is obliged to indicate the Fast Club as the second representative of the Amazonas in the Brazilian Championship Série D.
On 14 July the injunction was revoked.
Goiás:
All eligible teams from 2011 Campeonato Goiano 1ª Divisão (CRAC, Aparecidense, Goianésia, Morrinhos) withdrew and 2011 Campeonato Goiano 2ª Divisão season start in June. So the best placed non-2011 1ª Divisão team in 2010 Campeonato Goiano is qualified.

Minas Gerais: Best placed team América de Teófilo Otoni (4th) withdrew.

  Rio de Janeiro: The five best teams (Boavista, Olaria, Resende, Americano and Nova Iguaçu) withdrew.

Rondônia and Roraima:
All Rondônia and all Roraima-based teams withdrew. Since Rondônia and Roraima were already allocated in Group 1, the entries passed on to Amazonas and Mato Grosso best and second best placed on CBF's Ranking.

Tocantins:
Best placed team Gurupi (1st) withdrew.

== First stage ==
Key to colours in group tables
Group winners, runners-up advance to the Round of 16
Teams which can no longer advance to the Round of 16

=== Group 1 (AC-AM-MT) ===
Team	Pld	W	D	L	GF	GA	GD	Pts
(Mato Grosso) Cuiabá	8	5	1	2	19	11	+8	16
(Amazonas (Brazilian state)) Penarol	8	4	2	2	9	8	+1	14
(Acre (state)) Plácido de Castro	8	3	3	2	16	9	+7	12
(Amazonas (Brazilian state)) Nacional-AM	8	2	1	5	9	14	−5	7
(Mato Grosso) Vila Aurora	8	1	3	4	7	18	−11	6

=== Group 2 (AP-MA-PA-PI) ===
Team	Pld	W	D	L	GF	GA	GD	Pts
(Pará) Independente-PA	8	4	2	2	12	10	+2	14
(Maranhão) Sampaio Corrêa	8	4	1	3	17	8	+9	13
(Amapá) Trem	8	3	2	3	8	11	−3	11
(Pará) São Raimundo-PA	8	2	4	2	9	8	+1	10
(Piauí) Comercial-PI	8	2	1	5	6	15	−9	7

=== Group 3 (CE-PE-RN) ===
Team	Pld	W	D	L	GF	GA	GD	Pts
(Rio Grande do Norte) Santa Cruz-RN	8	5	1	2	9	6	+3	16
(Pernambuco) Santa Cruz	8	4	3	1	10	6	+4	15
(Ceará) Guarani de Juazeiro	8	3	2	3	7	4	+3	11
(Rio Grande do Norte) Alecrim	8	3	0	5	7	12	−5	9
(Pernambuco) Porto-PE	8	1	2	5	6	11	−5	5

=== Group 4 (AL-BA-PB-SE) ===
Team	Pld	W	D	L	GF	GA	GD	Pts
(Alagoas) Coruripe	8	5	1	2	13	11	+2	16
(Paraíba) Treze	8	5	0	3	14	11	+3	15
Bahia de Feira	8	4	0	4	12	9	+3	12
(Sergipe) River Plate-SE	8	2	2	4	10	12	−2	8
(Bahia) Vitória da Conquista	8	2	1	5	6	12	−6	7

=== Group 5 (DF-GO-MG-TO) ===
Team	Pld	W	D	L	GF	GA	GD	Pts
(Minas Gerais) Tupi	8	4	2	2	10	8	+2	14
(Goiás) Anapolina	8	4	1	3	15	11	+4	13
(Goiás) Itumbiara	8	4	1	3	13	10	+3	13
(Federal District (Brazil)) Gama	8	2	3	3	8	9	−1	9
(Tocantins) Tocantinópolis	8	2	1	5	8	18	−10	7

=== Group 6 (DF-ES-MG-RJ) ===
Team	Pld	W	D	L	GF	GA	GD	Pts
(Minas Gerais) Villa Nova	8	5	1	2	11	6	+5	16
(Rio de Janeiro (state)) Volta Redonda	8	4	3	1	11	3	+8	15
(Rio de Janeiro (state)) Audax Rio	8	3	2	3	13	7	+6	11
(Federal District (Brazil)) Formosa	8	2	3	3	5	12	−7	9
(Espírito Santo) São Mateus	8	0	3	5	7	19	−12	3

=== Group 7 (MS-PR-RS-SP) ===
Team	Pld	W	D	L	GF	GA	GD	Pts
(São Paulo (state)) Oeste	8	4	2	2	12	8	+4	14
(São Paulo (state)) Mirassol	8	4	2	2	6	7	−1	14
(Mato Grosso do Sul) CENE	8	4	1	3	15	13	+2	13
(Paraná (state)) Operário	8	3	1	4	7	9	−2	10
(Rio Grande do Sul) Cerâmica	8	1	2	5	6	9	−3	5

=== Group 8 (PR-RS-SC) ===
Team	Pld	W	D	L	GF	GA	GD	Pts
(Rio Grande do Sul) Juventude	8	6	1	1	19	7	+12	19
(Paraná (state)) Cianorte	8	4	2	2	9	9	+0	14
(Santa Catarina (state)) Brusque	8	3	1	4	6	11	−5	10
(Santa Catarina (state)) Metropolitano	8	3	0	5	14	16	−2	9
(Rio Grande do Sul) Cruzeiro-RS	8	1	2	5	6	11	−5	5

== Final stage ==
Round of 16
(Mato Grosso) Cuiabá	1	3	4
(Maranhão) Sampaio Corrêa	2	0	2
(Pará) Independente	0	3	3
(Amazonas (Brazilian state)) Penarol-AM	1	1	2
(Rio Grande do Norte) Santa Cruz-RN	1	0	1
(Paraíba) Treze	3	3	6
(Alagoas) Coruripe	0	0	1
(Pernambuco) Santa Cruz	1	0	0
(Minas Gerais) Tupi	0	4	4
(Rio de Janeiro (state)) Volta Redonda	1	2	3
(Minas Gerais) Villa Nova	0	2	2
(Goiás) Anapolina	1	1	2
(São Paulo (state)) Oeste	1	0	1 (4)
(Paraná (state)) Cianorte	0	1	1 (3)
(Rio Grande do Sul) Juventude	0	3	3
(São Paulo (state)) Mirassol	2	2	4

Quarterfinals
(Mato Grosso) Cuiabá	2	4	6
(Pará) Independente	0	2	2
(Paraíba) Treze	3	0	3
(Pernambuco) Santa Cruz	3	0	3
(Minas Gerais) Tupi	4	2	6
(Goiás) Anapolina	1	2	3
(São Paulo (state)) Oeste	3	1	4 (4)
(São Paulo (state)) Mirassol	1	3	4 (3)

Semifinals
(Mato Grosso) Cuiabá	0	1	1
(Pernambuco) Santa Cruz	1	2	3
(Minas Gerais) Tupi	3	3	6
(São Paulo (state)) Oeste	0	1	1

Finals
(Pernambuco) Santa Cruz	0	0	0
(Minas Gerais) Tupi	1	2	3
