= Talles Cunha =

Brazilian footballer (born 1989)

Personal information
- Full name: Talles Henrique da Cunha Carmo
- Date of birth: 13 March 1989 (age 37)
- Place of birth: Mogi Guaçu, Brazil
- Height: 1.80 m (5 ft 11 in)
- Positions: Forward; winger

Team information
- Current team: Esportivo

Youth career
- 2004–2006: Guarani

Senior career*
Years	Team	Apps	(Gls)
2007–2008	Guarani	37	(12)
2008	→ Internacional (loan)	24	(10)
2008–2012	Internacional	7	(3)
2010	→ São Caetano (loan)	9	(4)
2011	→ Criciúma (loan)	15	(8)
2012	→ Botafogo-SP (loan)	20	(10)
2013	Nova Iguaçu	10	(0)
2013–2014	Leixões	17	(5)
2014–2015	União da Madeira	20	(4)
2015	SC Sagamihara	14	(4)
2016	Zimbru Chișinău	10	(3)
2016	União da Madeira	12	(1)
2017	Ypiranga	16	(6)
2018	Veranópolis	5	(0)
2018	Cuiabá	5	(0)
2019	Veranópolis	11	(0)
2019	Glória	3	(1)
2020	São Luiz	0	(0)
2020	Pelotas	3	(0)
2021	Cabofriense	1	(0)
2021	Bagé	5	(0)
2022	Brasília	1	(0)
2022–	Esportivo	4	(0)

International career
2009	Brazil U-20	20	(5)
- * Club domestic league appearances and goals as of 19:51, 1 June 2022 (UTC)

Talles Henrique da Cunha Carmo (born 13 March 1989), is a Brazilian footballer who plays for Esportivo.

== Club career ==
Cunha was born in Mogi Guaçu. He began his career with Guarani, who was in January 2007 promoted to the first team and joined in April 2008 on loan to Internacional. He played a successful first season with Internacional and the club pulled the sold option from Guarani. He played only three matches in 2009 season and his club Internacional loaned on 23 February 2010 the forward until December 2010 to São Caetano. On 22 February 2011, he moved to Criciúma on loan from Internacional.

== International career ==
Cunha is former member of the Brazil under-20 football team.
