= Rio Pardo =

Municipality of Rio Grande do Sul, Brazil

- Municipality
- Municipality of Rio Pardo
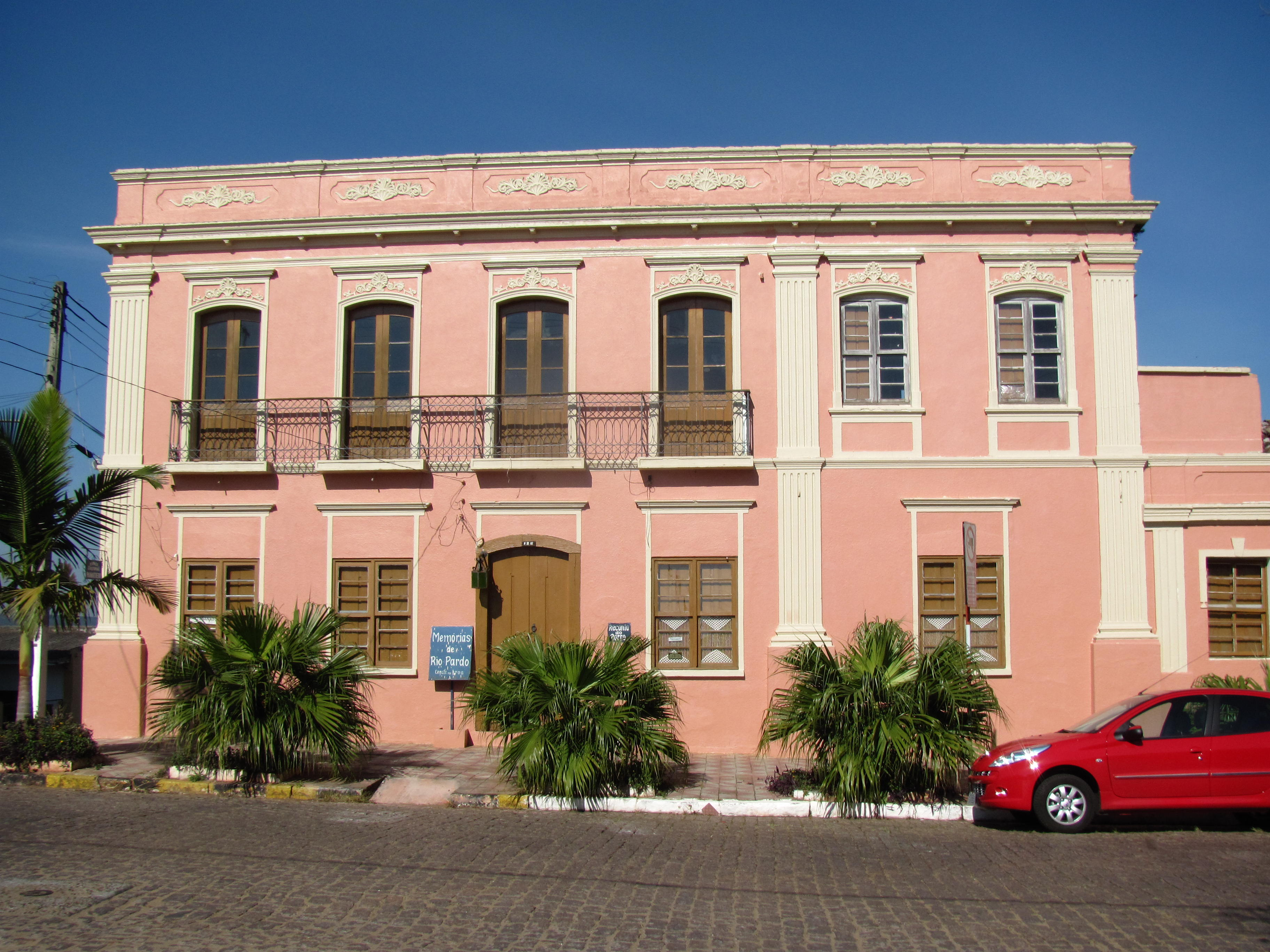
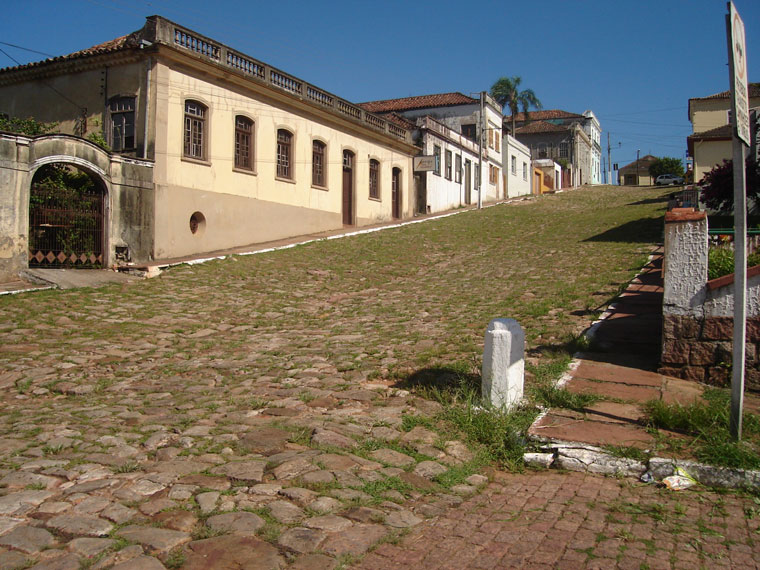
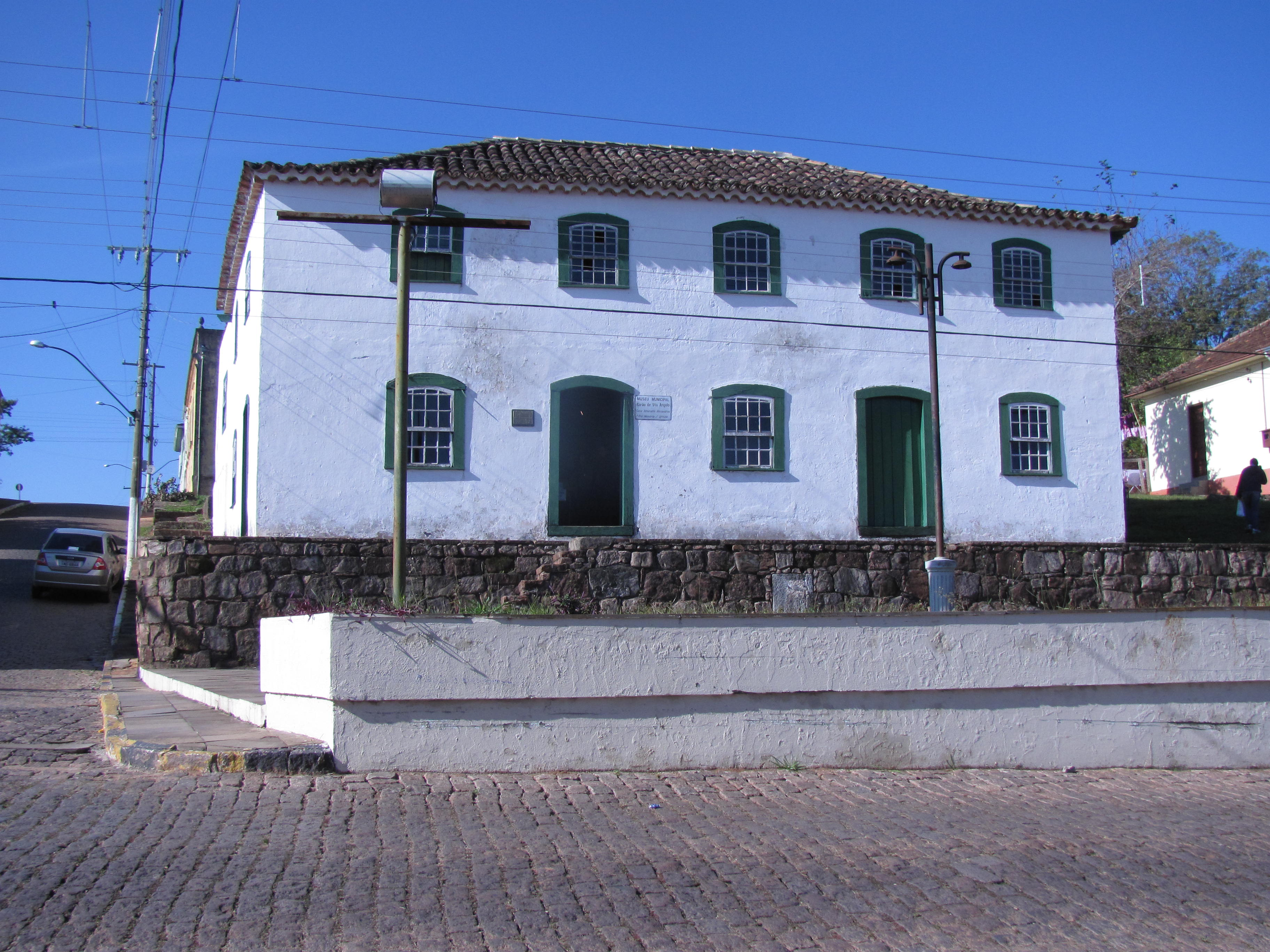
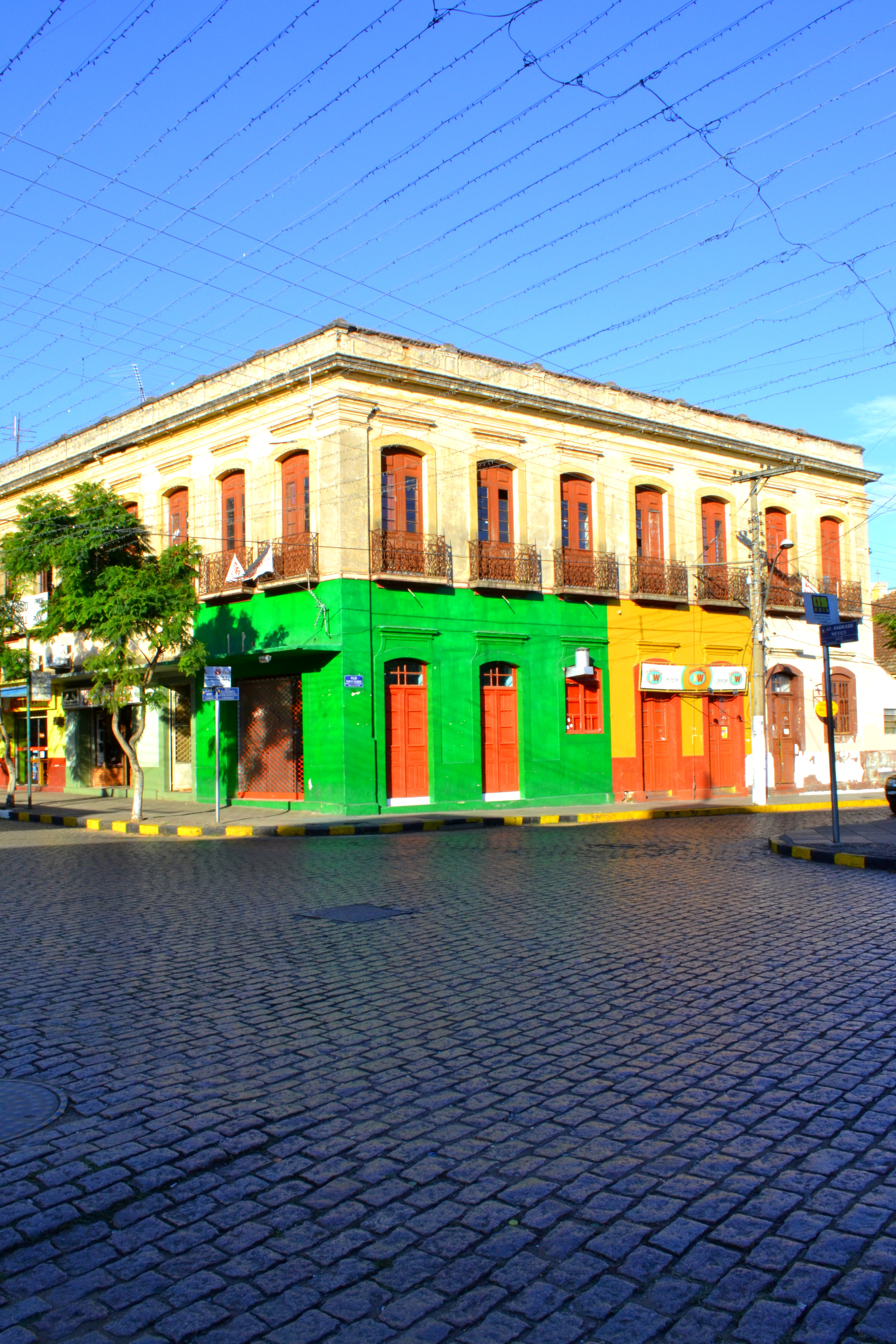
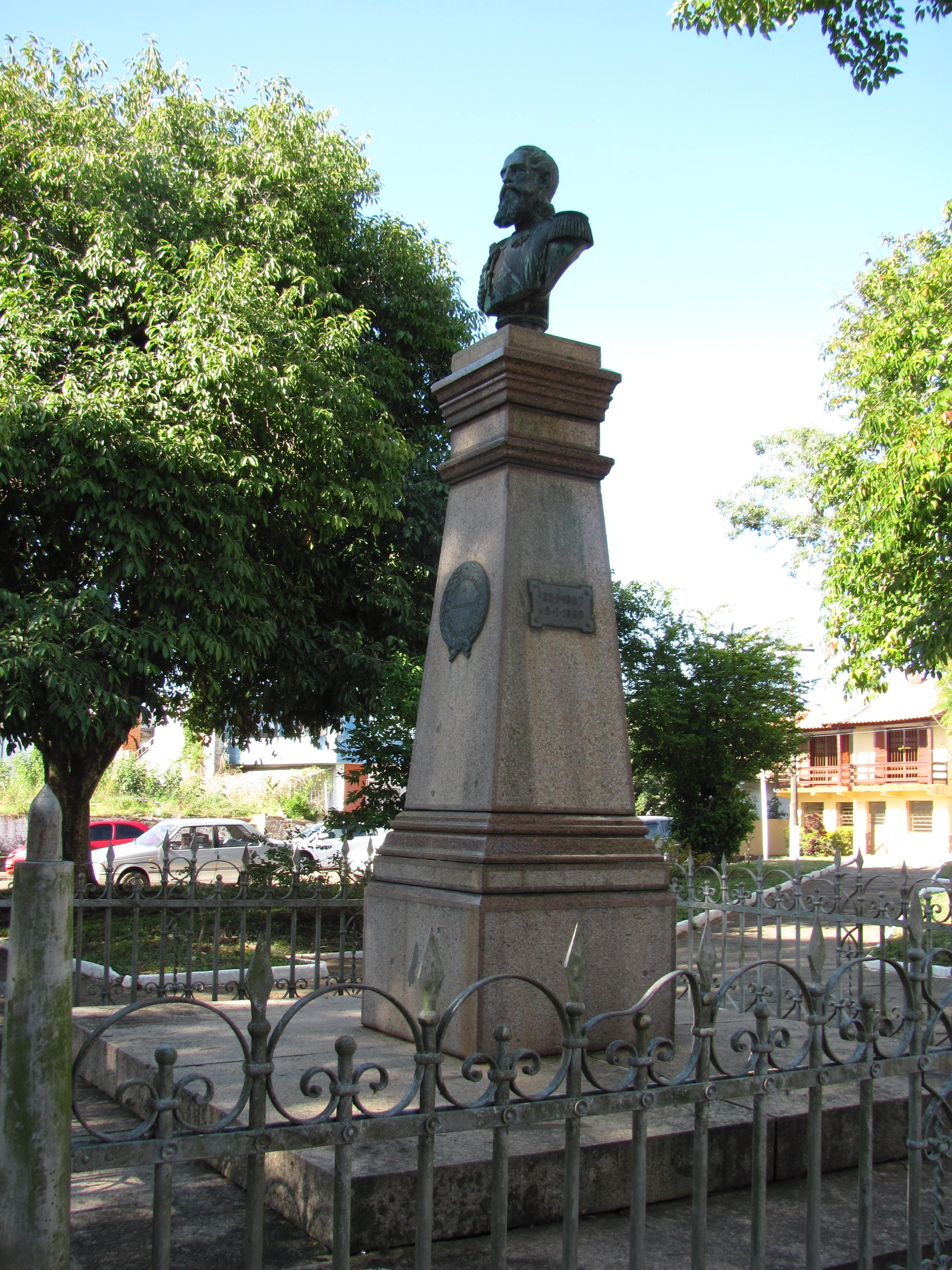
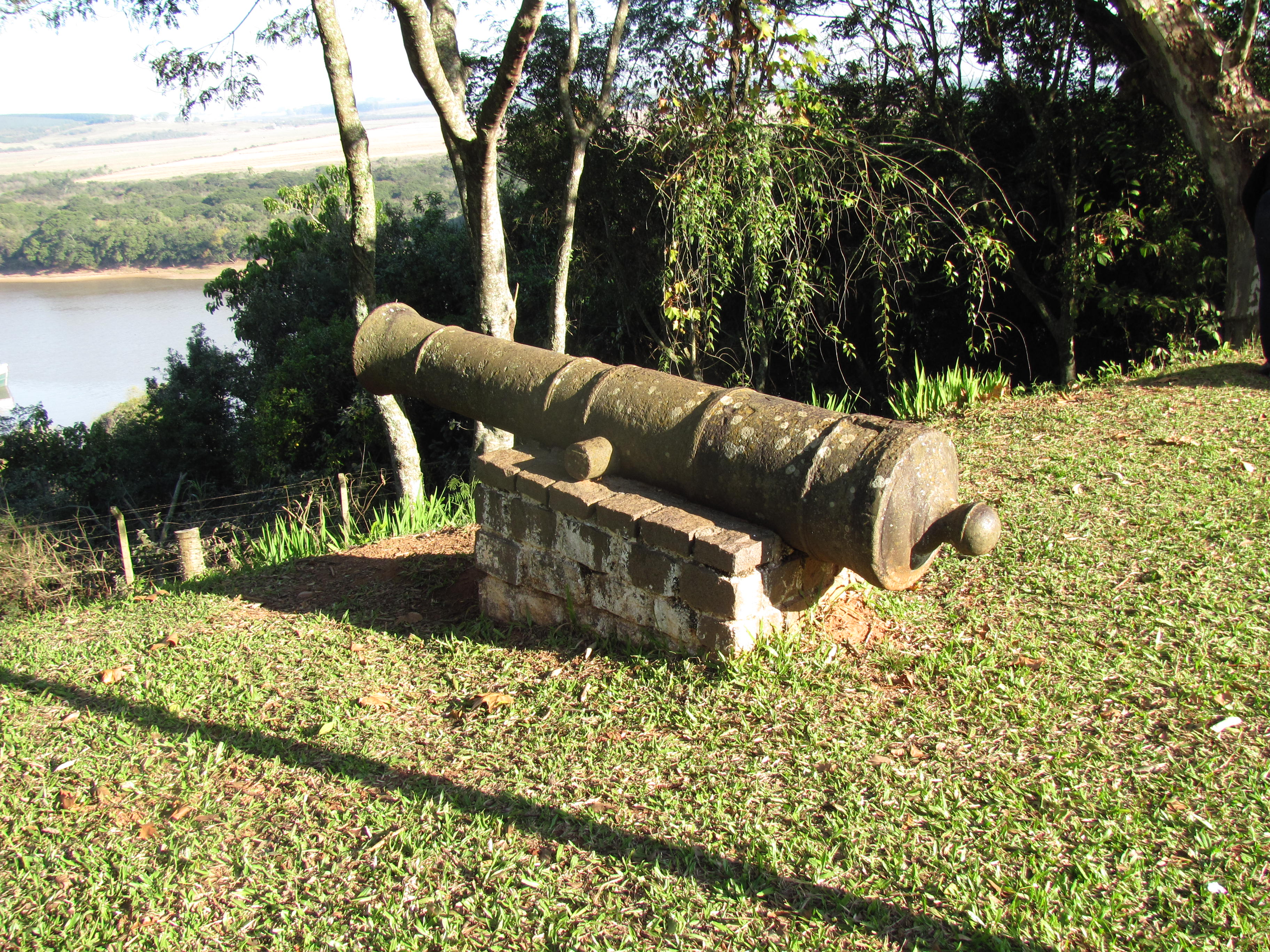
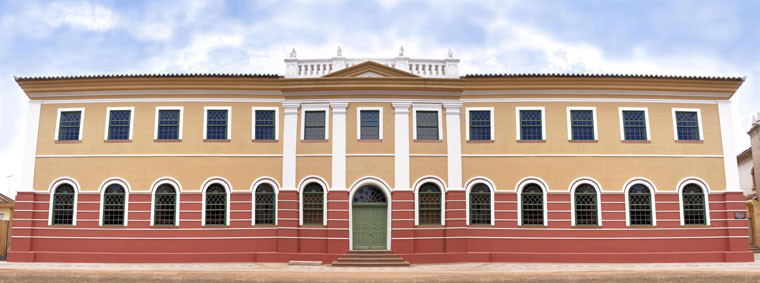

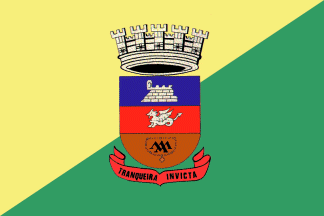
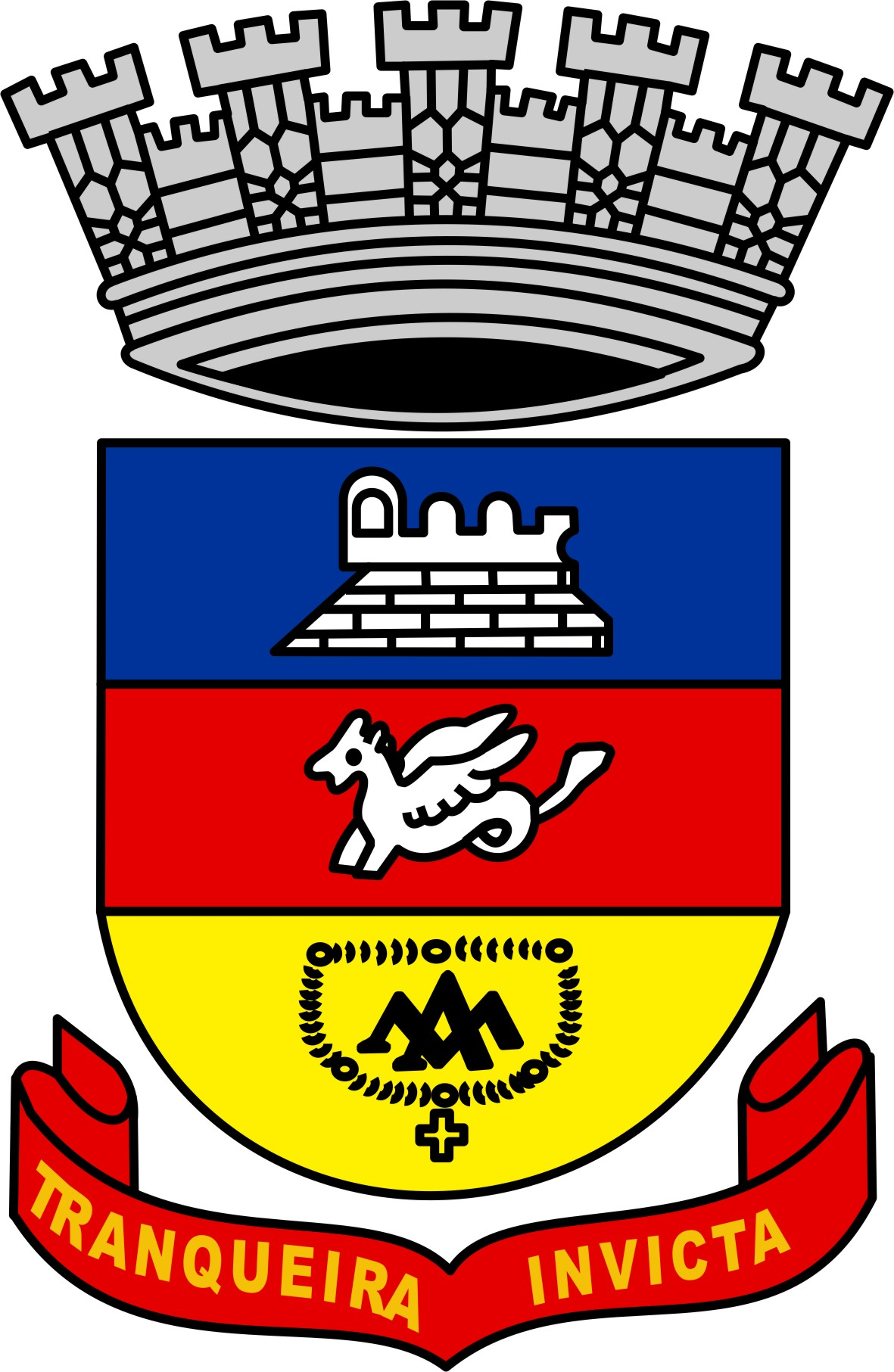
- Flag Coat of arms

- Location in Rio Grande do Sul state

- Location in Brazil
- Coordinates: 29°59′23″S 52°22′41″W
- Country: Brazil
- Region: South
- State: Rio Grande do Sul

Area
  - Total: 2,051 km^{2} (792 sq mi)
- Elevation: 41 m (135 ft)

Population (2022)
  - Total: 34,654
  - Density: 16.90/km^{2} (43.76/sq mi)
- Time zone: UTC−3 (BRT)
- HDI (2010): 0.754 – high

Rio Pardo is a municipality in the state of Rio Grande do Sul in Brazil. The population is 34,654 (2022 census) in an area of 2051 km^{2}. The elevation is 41 m.

== See also ==
- List of municipalities in Rio Grande do Sul
