= Grêmio Esportivo Brasil =

Brazilian association football club based in Pelotas, Rio Grande do Sul, Brazil

Brasil de Pelotas
- Full name: Grêmio Esportivo Brasil
- Nicknames: Xavante; Rubro-Negro (Scartlet-Black); Time de Guerreiros (Team of Warriors)
- Founded: 7 September 1911; 115 years ago
- Ground: Bento Freitas
- Capacity: 12,000
- President: Evânio Bandeira Tavares
- Head coach: Pingo
- League: Campeonato Brasileiro Série D Campeonato Gaúcho Série A2
- 2025 2025: Série D, 43rd of 64; Gaúcho, 11th of 12 (relegated)
- Website: www.gebrasil.com.br
Home colors	Away colors	Third colors

Grêmio Esportivo Brasil, commonly referred to as Brasil de Pelotas, is a Brazilian professional club based in Pelotas, Rio Grande do Sul founded on 7 September 1911. It competes in the Campeonato Brasileiro Série D, the fourth tier of Brazilian football, as well as in the Campeonato Gaúcho A2, the second level of the Rio Grande do Sul state football league.

== History ==
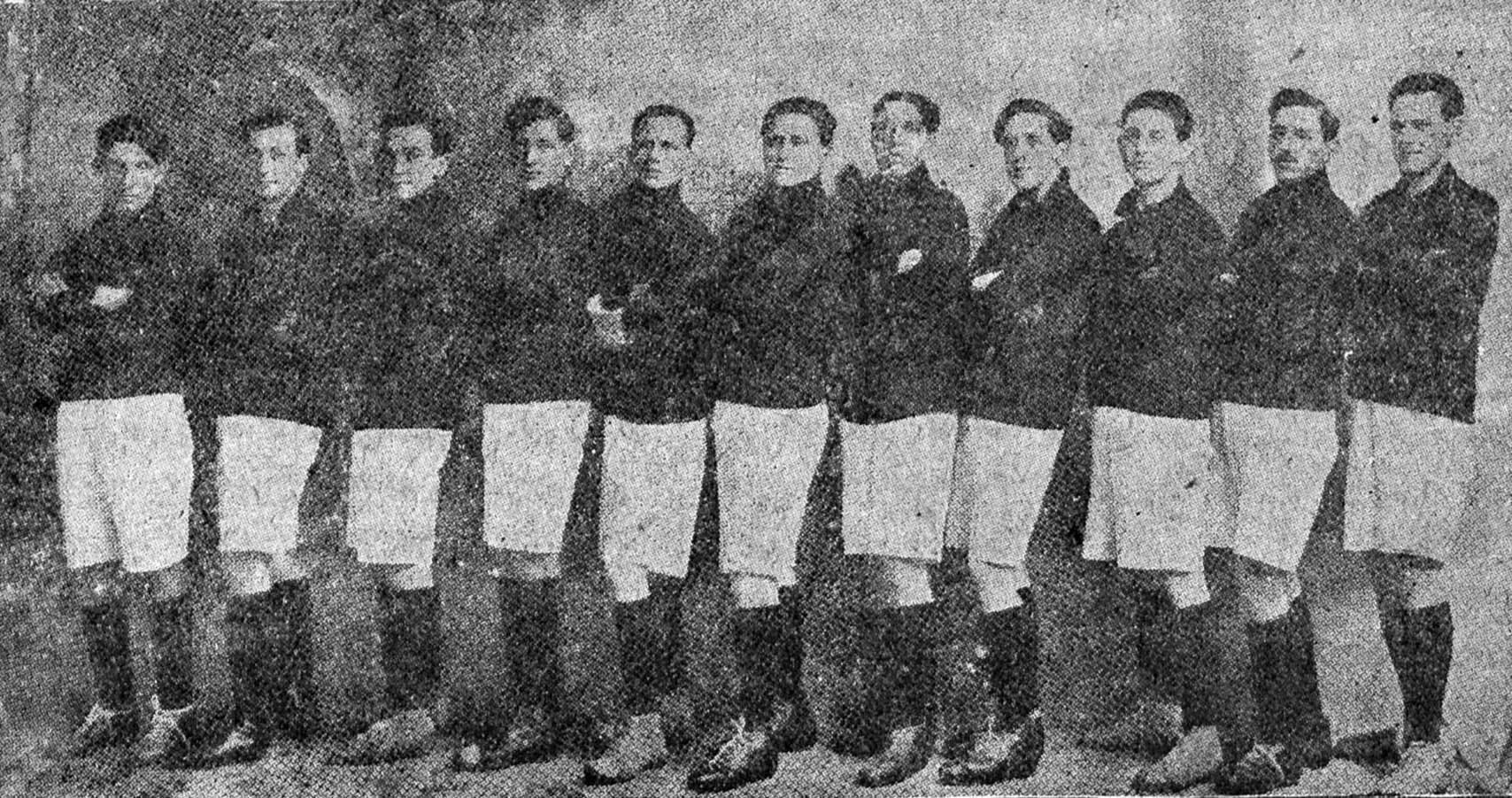
The squad that won the Pelotas championship treble in 1919

Grêmio Esportivo Brasil was founded after a dispute between players and directors of Sport Club Cruzeiro do Sul, which was supported and managed by employees of Cervejaria Haertel. On September 7, 1911, the Brazilian Independence anniversary, the club was founded at Santa Cruz street, in the residence of José Moreira de Brito, father of one of the former members of Cruzeiro do Sul, after a meeting between him and the other former members. The colours chosen were yellow and green, which are the colors of Brazil. Later, the club changed its colours to red and black, after Clube Diamantinos, a defunct club. The colours were also changed because EC Pelotas, rival of Brasil has similar colours.

The greatest moment in the club's history came during the 1985 Brazilian League, when Brasil managed to reach the semi-finals after moving past giants such as Flamengo. However, the club from Pelotas did not manage to defeat Bangu from Rio de Janeiro and ended up missing the glory of taking part in the final match.

The following years were not nearly as successful. Even though the club was frequently invited to take part in the Brazilian League due to their fanatic crowd, performances were usually disappointing. In the league of Rio Grande do Sul, the club spent a few years in the second division. In 2004, Brasil won the second division of the regional league, the first title in many years.

On January 16, 2009 the team bus plunged 130 ft into a ravine in Rio Grande do Sul when returning from a friendly match against Santa Cruz. Striker Claudio Milar, defender Regis and goalkeeping coach Giovani were killed in the accident caused by the driver losing control when making a turn, more than 20 others were injured.

== Rivalries ==
Brasil de Pelotas' biggest rival is Pelotas, that together make the biggest derby in the southern region of the state, and one of the biggest in the state of Rio Grande do Sul. Another rival is Farroupilha.

== Stadium ==
Brasil de Pelotas' stadium is the Estádio Bento Freitas, built in 1943. The stadium has a maximum capacity of 18,000 people.

== Players ==
=== Current squad ===
As of 21 February 2022

Note: Flags indicate national team as defined under FIFA eligibility rules; some limited exceptions apply. Players may hold more than one non-FIFA nationality.

No.	Pos.	Nation	Player
—	GK	BRA	Enzo
—	GK	BRA	Marcelo
—	GK	BRA	Victor Brasil
—	GK	BRA	Vitor Luiz
—	DF	BRA	Fernando
—	DF	BRA	Gilberto Alemão
—	DF	BRA	Helerson
—	DF	BRA	Pedro Miritz
—	DF	BRA	Douglas Pato
—	DF	BRA	Gabriel Araújo
—	DF	BRA	Rafael Castro
—	DF	BRA	Henrique Ávila
—	DF	BRA	Marcelinho
—	DF	BRA	Matheus
—	MF	BRA	Felipe

No.	Pos.	Nation	Player
—	MF	BRA	Fernandinho
—	MF	BRA	Herisson
—	MF	BRA	Juliano Pacheco
—	MF	BRA	Karl
—	MF	BRA	Luiz Meneses
—	MF	BRA	Marllon
—	MF	BRA	Ruan
—	FW	BRA	André Santos
—	FW	BRA	Bruno Paulo
—	FW	BRA	Joanderson
—	FW	BRA	Léo Ferraz
—	FW	BRA	Luiz Filipe
—	FW	BRA	Luizinho
—	FW	BRA	Paulo Victor
—	FW	BRA	Thiago Santos

=== Out on loan ===
Note: Flags indicate national team as defined under FIFA eligibility rules; some limited exceptions apply. Players may hold more than one non-FIFA nationality.

No.	Pos.	Nation	Player

== Honours ==
=== Official tournaments ===
State
Competitions	Titles	Seasons
Campeonato Gaúcho	1	1919
Copa FGF	1	2025
Copa Governador do Estado	1	1972
Campeonato Gaúcho Série A2	3	1961, 2004, 2013

=== Others tournaments ===
==== State ====
- Campeonato do Interior Gaúcho (11): 1919, 1953, 1954, 1955, 1963, 1968, 1983, 1984, 2014, 2015, 2022
- Copa Cléber Furtado (1): 1992
- Taça Centenário FGF (1): 2018
- Copa Cidade de Porto Alegre (1): 1991

==== State Regional ====
- Regional do Campeonato Gaúcho (7): 1926, 1927, 1941, 1946, 1950, 1955, 1961
- Torneio Seletivo do Campeonato Gaúcho-Região Sul (11): 1919, 1921, 1931, 1942, 1948, 1949, 1950, 1952, 1953, 1954, 1955

==== City ====
- Campeonato Citadino de Pelotas (28): 1917, 1918, 1919, 1921, 1926, 1927, 1929, 1931, 1937, 1941, 1942, 1946, 1948, 1949, 1950, 1952, 1953, 1954, 1955, 1961, 1962, 1963, 1964, 1970, 1977, 1982, 2004, 2006
- Taça Cidade de Pelotas (1): 1982
- Torneio do Dia dos Desportos em Pelotas (1): 1940

=== Runners-up ===
- Campeonato Brasileiro Série D (1): 2014
- Campeonato Gaúcho (5): 1953, 1954, 1955, 1983, 2018
- Copa FGF (3): 2007, 2012, 2026
- Copa Governador do Estado (1): 1977
- Campeonato Gaúcho Série A2 (1): 2002

== See also ==
- List of accidents involving sports teams
