= Guarany Futebol Clube (Camaquã) =

Guarany
- Full name: Guarany Futebol Clube
- Nicknames: Bugre Camaquense; Alviazul; Bugrão
- Founded: Juny 16, 1946
- Ground: Estádio Coronel Sílvio Luz, Camaquã, Rio Grande do Sul state, Brazil
- Capacity: 3,000
- Website: http://www.guaranycamaqua.com.br
Home colours	Away colours

Guarany Futebol Clube, commonly known as Guarany, is a Brazilian football club based in Camaquã, Rio Grande do Sul state.

== History ==
The club was founded on February 12, 1946, by former players of Atlético Camaqüense. The club was then named after Guarany of Bagé.

== Stadium ==
Guarany Futebol Clube play their home games at Estádio Coronel Sílvio Luz. The stadium has a maximum capacity of 3,000 people.
