= Esporte Clube 14 de Julho =

14 de Julho
- Full name: Esporte Clube 14 de Julho
- Nicknames: Leão da Fronteira; Rubro Negro da Fronteira
- Founded: July 14, 1902
- Ground: Estádio João Martins, Santana do Livramento, Rio Grande do Sul state, Brazil
- Capacity: 5,000
- President: Julio Batisti
- Head Coach: Sebastian Rosano
- Website: https://ec14dejulho.com.br/
Home colours	Away colours

Esporte Clube 14 de Julho, commonly known as 14 de Julho, is a Brazilian football club based in Santana do Livramento, Rio Grande do Sul state.

The club was founded on 14 July 1902, in the Santana do Livramento-Rivera border, which separates Brazil and Uruguay. In the first decades after the club's foundation, they played several games and competitions in Uruguay.

During his youth the World Cup participant of 1930 Moderato Wisintainer played for the club.

== Stadium ==
Esporte Clube 14 de Julho play their home games at Estádio João Martins. The stadium has a maximum capacity of 5,000 people.

== Honours ==
=== City ===
- Campeonato Citadino de Santana do Livramento
  - Winners (40): 1906, 1907, 1908, 1909, 1910, 1911, 1912, 1913, 1914, 1915, 1916, 1917, 1918, 1919, 1920, 1921, 1924, 1927, 1928, 1929, 1930, 1931, 1932, 1934, 1941, 1943, 1944, 1945, 1949, 1951, 1952, 1955, 1956, 1958, 1959, 1960, 1964, 1965, 1966, 1982
