= Esporte Clube Cruzeiro =

Cruzeiro
- Full name: Esporte Clube Cruzeiro
- Nickname(s): Cruzeirinho (Little Cruzeiro); Leão da Montanha (Lion of the Mountain); Estrelado (The Starry One)
- Founded: July 14, 1913; 112 years ago
- Ground: Arena Cruzeiro
- Capacity: 16,000
- President: Claudio Lempek
- Head coach: Claiton dos Santos
- Website: www.cruzeiropoa.com.br
Home colors	Away colors

Esporte Clube Cruzeiro, commonly referred to as Cruzeiro-RS, is a Brazilian football club based in Cachoeirinha, Rio Grande do Sul. It currently plays in Campeonato Gaúcho Série A2, the second level of the Rio Grande do Sul state football league.

It was founded in 1913, preceding Cruzeiro Esporte Clube from Belo Horizonte, the most famous team of the same name. Cruzeiro won the 1929 Campeonato Gaúcho. In the 1953 the team was the first from Rio Grande do Sul to tour Europe, winning an international friendly tournament in 1960.

== History ==
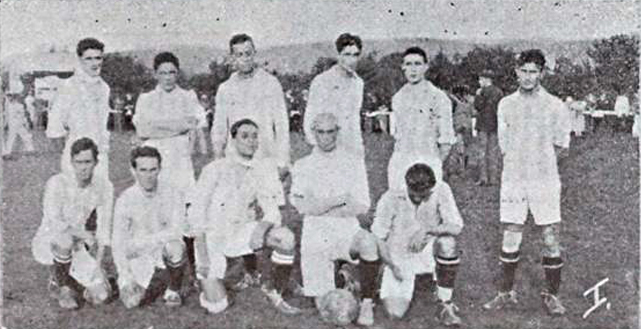
Cruzeiro in 1919

The club was founded on July 14, 1913, in Porto Alegre. From 1913 to 2018, the team was based in Porto Alegre, being one of the main teams in the city along with Grêmio, Internacional and São José. It was one of the main powers of the state until it entered a period of decline in the 1960s. The club was pioneer of Rio Grande do Sul to tour Europe, making its first trip in 1953. 1960, the club won an international friendly tournament in East Germany, known as the "Torneio de Páscoa" (Easter Tournament) against multiple teams from Eastern and Western Germany. Cruzeiro won the title after defeating Vorwaerts Berlin and tying with Dynamo Berlin.

Cruzeiro competed in the Série D in 2011, when the club was eliminated in the first stage of the competition.

João de Assis Moreira, the father of the legendary Brazilian footballer Ronaldinho, had a brief spell with the club.

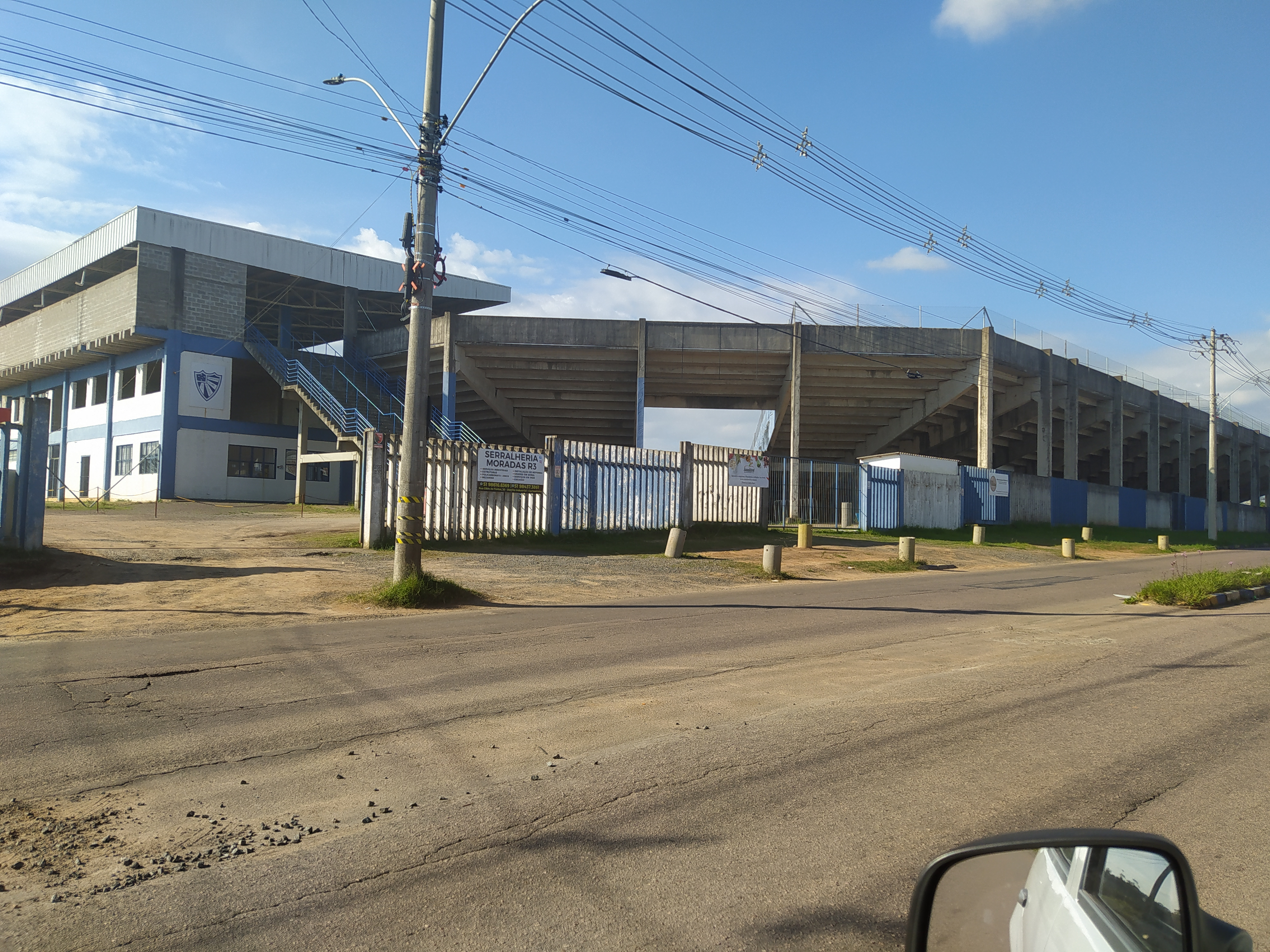
Arena Cruzeiro in Cachoeirinha

In 2012, construction began on a new stadium in the city of Cachoeirinha, located in the metropolitan area of Porto Alegre. The Arena Cruzeiro, which was inaugurated on March 13, 2019.

== Honours ==
=== State ===
- Campeonato Gaúcho
  - Winners (1): 1929
- Copa Governador do Estado
  - Winners (1): 1970
- Super Copa Gaúcha
  - Runners-up (1): 2015
- Campeonato Gaúcho Série A2
  - Winners (1): 2010
- Campeonato Gaúcho Série B
  - Winners (1): 2023
- Copa Metropolitana
  - Winners (1): 2015
- Torneio Início do Campeonato Gaúcho
  - Winners (1): 1962

=== City ===
- Campeonato Citadino de Porto Alegre
  - Winners (3): 1918, 1921, 1929
- Torneio Início de Porto Alegre
  - Winners (4): 1925, 1943, 1951, 1962
- Torneio Triangular de Porto Alegre
  - Winners (1): 1943
- Torneio Extra da Cidade de Porto Alegre
  - Winners (1): 1943
- Taça Cidade de Porto Alegre
  - Winners (1): 1947
