= Porto Alegre Futebol Clube =

Brazilian football club

Porto Alegre
- Full name: Porto Alegre Futebol Clube
- Nicknames: Porto; Tricolor do Lami; Matador; Tricolor da Zona Sul
- Founded: January 9, 2006
- Dissolved: 30 January 2012; 14 years ago
- Ground: Estádio João da Silva Moreira, Porto Alegre, Brazil
- Capacity: 500
- Chairman: Roberto de Assis Moreira
- Head coach: Marcelo Rospide
- League: Campeonato Gaúcho
- 2010: Campeonato Gaúcho, Group 1, 5th
- Website: http://www.poafc.com.br/
| Home colors | Away colors |

Porto Alegre Futebol Clube, usually known simply as Porto Alegre, was a Brazilian football club from Porto Alegre, Brazil. It is owned by former footballer Roberto Assis, Ronaldinho's brother.

On 30 January 2012 the club closed its activities. In 2022, the physical structure of Parque Lami was sold to Monsoon FC.

== History ==
=== Lami ===
The club was founded on June 10, 2003, as Lami Futebol Clube.

In 2003, Lami won its first title, the Campeonato Gaúcho Third Level.

=== Porto Alegre ===
In 2006, the club was bought by Roberto Assis and renamed to Porto Alegre Futebol Clube.

=== Club colors ===
Porto Alegre's colors are inspired by the two most popular Rio Grande do Sul football clubs, Grêmio and Internacional, and Spanish club FC Barcelona. The home kit is composed of red and white vertical stripes, white shorts and red socks. The away kit is like FC Barcelona's home kit, being composed of blue and red vertical stripes, blue shorts and blue socks. The third kit is composed of a three-colored vertical sash in a black shirt, white shorts and gray socks.

=== Flamengo ===
In 2010, the Porto Alegre mediated a partnership with the Flamengo the intention is use the structure of Porto Alegre.

== Honours ==
- Campeonato Gaúcho Série A2
  - Winners (1): 2009
- Campeonato Gaúcho Série B
  - Winners (1): 2003

== Season records ==
| Season | League | Result | | Copa FGF |
| Season | League | Stage (Teams) | Position | Copa FGF |
|---|---|---|---|---|
| 2003 | Third Division | First Stage(6) | 1st | |
| 2004 | Second Division | Second Stage(3*6er) | 18th 6th(group) | |
| 2005 | Second Division | Second Stage(3*6er) | 17th 6th(group) | 1st stage |
| 2006 | Second Division | Second Stage (2*8er) | 8th 4th(group) | QF |
| 2007 | Second Division | Second Stage (2*8er) | 9th 5th(group) | |
| 2008 | Second Division | Final Stage(8) | 7th | R16 |
| 2009 | Second Division | Final Stage | 1st | R16 |
| 2010 | Primera Division | - | 14th | QF |
| 2011 | Primera Division | - | 16th | |
| 2012 | Second Division | | | |

== Stadium ==
=== Estádio João da Silva Moreira ===
Porto Alegre play their home games at Estádio João da Silva Moreira (also known as Parque Lami).

== Presidents ==
- Roberto de Assis Moreira (2006–2012)
