= Cerâmica Atlético Clube =

Cerâmica
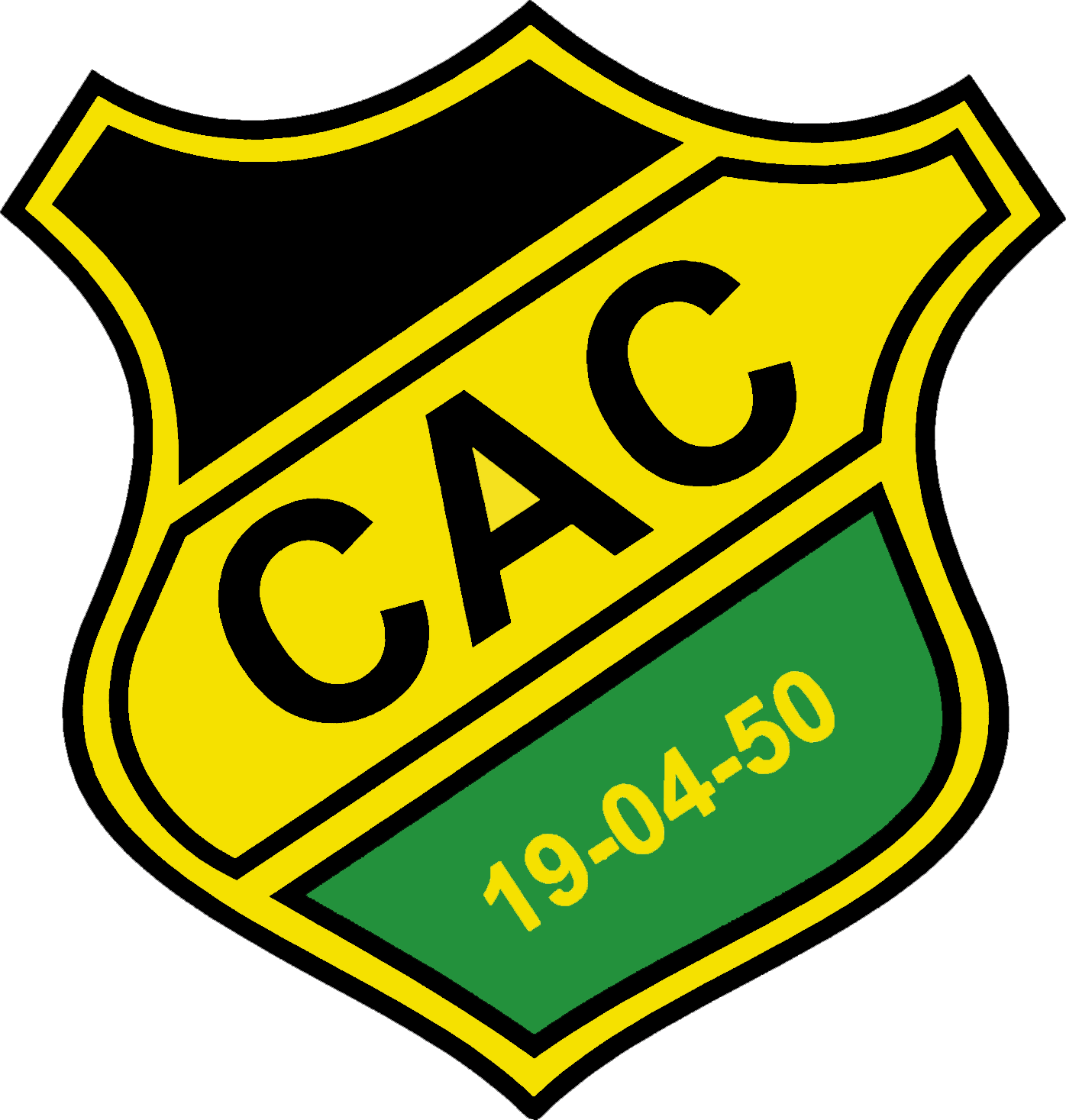
- Full name: Cerâmica Atlético Clube
- Nickname(s): CAC; Cera; Tricolor; Tricolor da Aldeia; Cerâmáquina
- Founded: April 19, 1950
- Ground: Antônio Vieira Ramos a.k.a.Vieirão, Gravataí, Brazil
- Capacity: 5,000
- President: Décio Vicente Becker
- Head Coach: Lico
- League: Campeonato Brasileiro Série D
- 2011: Série D, 37th
- Website: http://www.ceramicaatleticoclube.com.br/
Home colours	Away colours	Third colours

Cerâmica Atlético Clube, usually known as simply as Cerâmica, is a Brazilian football club from Gravataí, Rio Grande do Sul state, founded by the workers of the Ceramic of Gravataí. They competed in the Série D once.

== History ==
On April 19, 1950, Cerâmica Atlético Clube was founded by employees of the Ceramic of Gravataí.

The club ensured the promotion to the first division of the state on July 6, 2011.

== Honours ==
=== Regional ===
- Recopa Sul-Brasileira
  - Winners (1): 2010

=== State ===
- Copa FGF
  - Runners-up (2): 2008, 2010
- Campeonato Gaúcho Série A2
  - Runners-up (1): 2011

=== City ===
- Campeonato Citadino de Gravataí
  - Winners (4): 1955, 1966, 1987, 1988
