= Type 26 revolver =

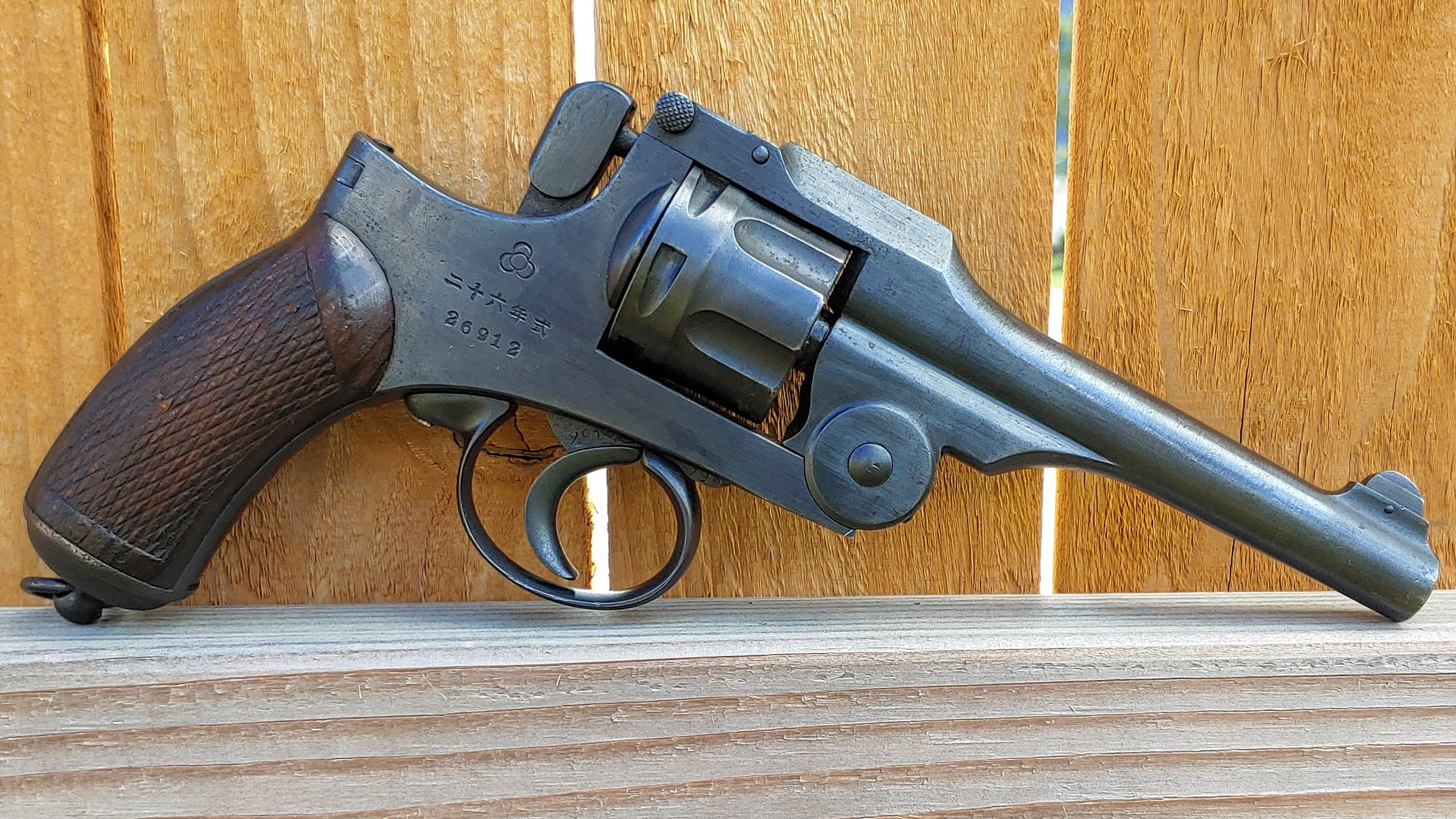
- Type: Revolver
- Place of origin: Japan

Service history
- In service: 1893–1945
- Used by: See users
- Wars: Russo-Japanese War, Second Sino-Japanese War, World War I, World War II, Korean War

Production history
- Designed: 1893
- Manufacturer: Koishikawa Arsenal
- Produced: 1893–1935
- No. built: 59,300 to 59,900

Specifications
- Mass: 880 g (1 lb 15 oz) unloaded
- Length: 231 mm (9.09 in)
- Barrel length: 121 mm (4.76 in)
- Height: 130 mm (5.12 in)
- Cartridge: 9×22mmR Type 26
- Action: Double-action
- Muzzle velocity: 229 m/s (750 ft/s)
- Feed system: 6–round cylinder
- Sights: Blade, V-notch

The Type 26 or Model 26 "hammerless" revolver (二十六年式拳銃, Nijuuroku-nen-shiki kenjuu) was the first modern revolver adopted by the Imperial Japanese Army. It was developed at the Koishikawa Arsenal and is named for its year of adoption in the Japanese dating system (the 26th year of the Meiji era, i.e., 1893). The revolver saw action in conflicts including the Russo-Japanese War, World War I and World War II.

It is an amalgamation of design features from other revolvers made during the time period. The revolver has a design flaw in that the cylinder freewheels when not engaged, so during movement (such as in combat) it may rotate to an already-fired chamber. Five distinct phases of production have different markings depending on the time and individual Type 26 produced. The 9mm Japanese revolver ammunition used is unique to the weapon. The Type 26 has a double-action only mechanism and is therefore difficult to aim accurately. The Type 26 was replaced by the Nambu pistol in the first half of the 20th century.

== History ==
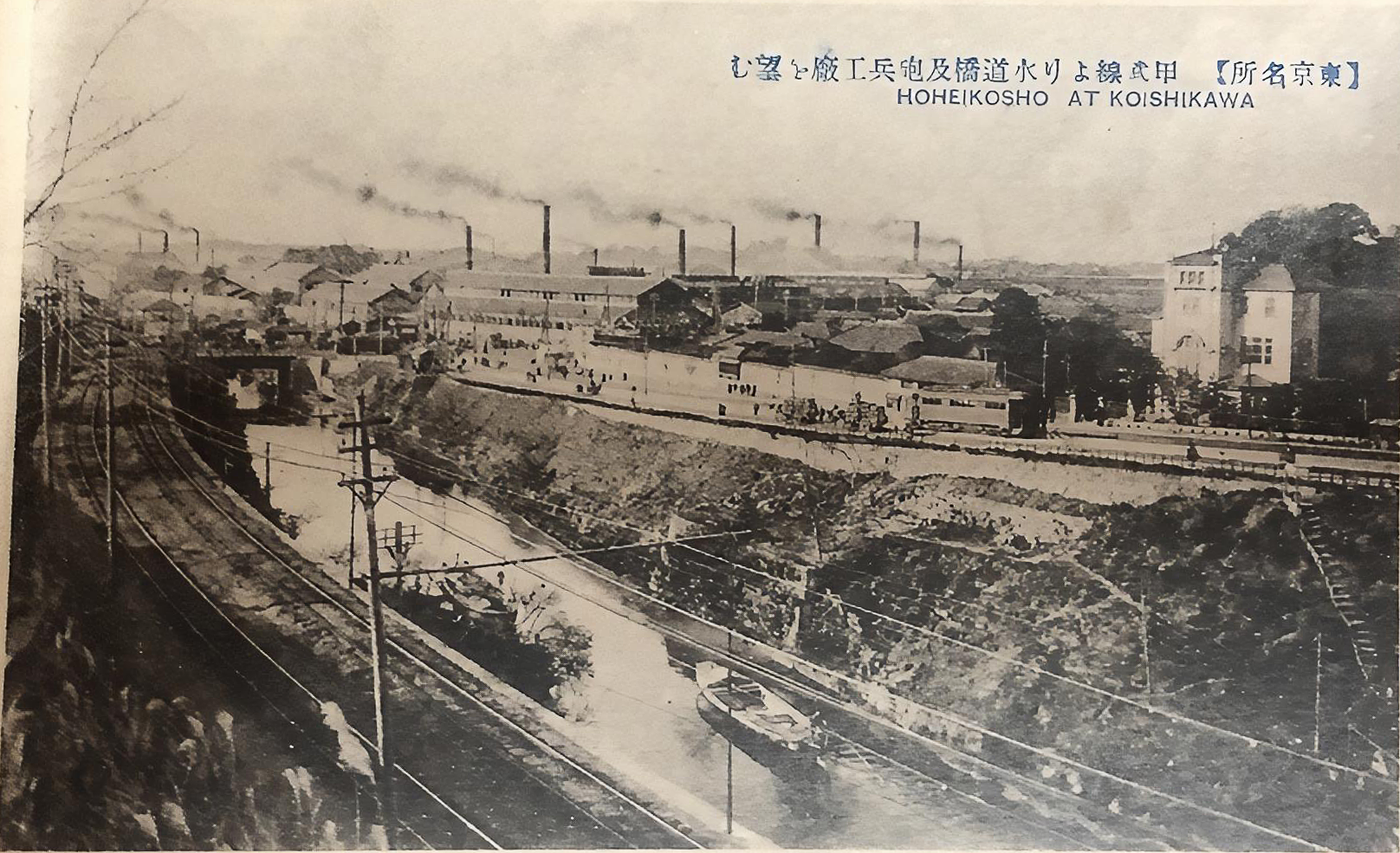
Koishikawa Arsenal before the Great Kantō earthquake

Known as the Meiji 26 Nen Ken Ju (meaning 'Pistol, pattern of the 26th year of the Meiji era'), the Type 26 revolver was the first indigenous revolver adopted by the Japanese military. The Type 26 was produced to replace the aging Smith & Wesson New Model No. 3 and was officially adopted March 29, 1894. The design is widely believed to be a mixture of features taken from other revolvers. The lock is similar to Galand designs, the hinged frame is similar to Smith & Wesson designs, and the hinged side plate covering the lock is similar to the Modèle 1892 revolver. The cartridge was loaded with black powder until 1900 when the cartridges began to be loaded with smokeless powder.

The Type 26 is considered a remarkable leap in Japanese pistol development despite the international influence, with the matchlock being the most common domestic Japanese handgun 40 years earlier. Production stopped after 1923 when much of the Koishikawa Arsenal was destroyed in the 1923 Great Kantō earthquake, with assembly continuing until the exhaustion of stockpiled parts. Approximately 59,000 Type 26 revolvers were produced and an additional 900 revolvers were made in pre-production. Restoration and re-issue of revolvers that had been removed from service because of damage or wear, was carried out on an as-needed basis over a period of many years. The original Type 26s are missing the external markings of later produced revolvers and are identifiable by numbers stamped on internal parts.

Type 26s were still being used in 1945 which, according to firearms expert and author Ian Hogg, is considered a testament to their original workmanship and a much more suitable combat weapon than later Japanese-produced pistols.

== Design ==
The Type 26 revolver is 231 mm (9.09 in) in length and 130 mm (5.12 in) tall, weighing 880 g (1 lb 15 oz) unloaded. It has a round barrel, with the foresight blade being embedded directly into the barrel. The rear sight is incorporated into the top of the frame. A hinged sideplate allows access to the mechanism for lubricating and servicing. The weapon was opened by lifting the top latch, after which the barrel was swung downward, activating the automatic ejector.

The notch that allows access to the cylinder is at the top rear of the frame. The revolver is double-action only because of the absence of a cocking spur, intended to avoid snagging on clothing and firing accidentally. The lock was self-cocking and was slow to respond. The delay in response made accurate shooting virtually impossible. The cylinder contains a serious design flaw, with it only notching while the hammer is cocked. This allows the cylinder to revolve by being brushed against an object or the inertia from a sudden sideways motion. As the cylinder can move freely, an empty or already-fired chamber can rotate into position instead of the next shot, a dangerous event for the user during combat. Later Type 26 revolvers have grips with lateral serrations in place of an earlier knurled pattern as well as differences in external finish, depth, and look of die-stamped markings.

The bluing of the steel is excellent, even though the steel used is soft compared to Western standards. The 9mm Japanese revolver ammunition used by the Type 26 is unique to the weapon. Both the Type 26 revolver and the ammunition used was later replaced by semi-automatic pistols such as the Nambu in the beginning of the 20th century.

== Five production periods ==
Differences in markings and appearance across surviving Type 26 revolvers, has led to the categorization of production runs into five categories.

=== Limited early production with no markings ===
Early production Type 26s have no external markings. The revolvers have markings that indicate they were arsenal-reworked and believed to have been produced in late 1893 or early 1894 before official adoption. It is possible that around 300 revolvers with no external marking were produced. No known examples of Type 26 revolvers have duplicate serial numbers.

=== Limited early production ===
A small number of revolvers are known to have the external arsenal symbol stamped but without the external serial number stamped on the frame. The revolvers are interspersed among revolvers with standard production markings for unknown reasons. This production range has examples reported to chamber .38 S&W ammunition but this could be because of later modifications.

=== Standard production ===
All standard production Type 26s have checked pattern grip panels as well as original finished characteristics. Most standard production revolvers have a serial number between 1,000 and 58,900. Many standard production models suffered from extreme wear because of the long military service the revolvers served.

=== Limited final production ===
The final production revolvers were possibly produced after the Great Kantō earthquake and possibly only 325 were produced. Known examples have serial numbers ranging from 58,903 to 59,227.

=== Arsenal reworked ===
Arsenal reworked Type 26s lack the bright charcoal blue finish or standard checked patterned grip panels. Serrated grip panels are common among reworked Type 26s and the marking of the Nagoya Arsenal indicates repairing of the Type 26 past its production at the Koshikawa Arsenal. Two existing arsenal reworked Type 26s show stampings of Siamese numerals on the front grips indicating official procurement by the Thai government. Two additional reworked Type 26s have a five-pointed star stamped on the side plate of the revolver indicating Indonesian service after World War II.

== Accessories ==
=== Holster ===
The Type 26 revolver was issued with a clamshell holster similar to the French Modèle 1892 revolver. The earliest Type 26 holsters were black, and the cotton lanyards issued with them were a dark blue color known in Japan as kon. A leather pocket for the cleaning rod was provided, sewn onto the forward edge of the holster body. Most examples of holsters are stamped on the inside of the clamshell flap with the maker's identification and arsenal inspection markings with the year of manufacture.

Very early holsters, issued in the late 1890s and early 1900s, were of slightly different size and shape and without a pocket for the cleaning rod. A few holsters developed in 1943 have been noted to be all black lacquered hardware, missing the brass and galvanized steel fittings. Holsters produced towards the end of World War II have a last-ditch fabric similar to late production Type 94 Nambu pistol holsters, with no shoulder straps or pouches for cleaning rods and ammunition.

=== Grenade launcher ===
The Type 90 tear gas grenade launcher was developed to be fired with the Type 26 revolver. Gas grenades could be fired by a special 9x22 mm cartridge in place of the regular ball ammunition.

== Users ==
- Empire of Japan
- Indonesia
- Republic of China: Used by some warlord armies (including locally made copies).
- North Korea: Known to be used briefly by North Korean troops in the Korean War.
- Thailand
