= 9mm Japanese revolver =

Revolver cartridge

9×22mmR Type 26
- Type: Revolver
- Place of origin: Japan

Service history
- In service: 1893–1945
- Used by: Japan
- Wars: Russo-Japanese War; World War I Second Sino-Japanese War; World War II

Production history
- Designed: 1893

Specifications
- Case type: Rimmed, tapered
- Bullet diameter: 9.04 mm (0.356 in)
- Neck diameter: 9.47 mm (0.373 in)
- Base diameter: 9.83 mm (0.387 in)
- Rim diameter: 11.05 mm (0.435 in)
- Rim thickness: 0.75 mm (0.030 in)
- Case length: 21.89 mm (0.862 in)
- Overall length: 29.99 mm (1.181 in)
- Primer type: Small pistol

Ballistic performance
Bullet mass/type	Velocity	Energy
9.7 g (150 gr) LRN	150 m/s (490 ft/s)	111 J (79 ft⋅lbf)
9.7 g (150 gr) LRN	229 m/s (750 ft/s)	252 J (180 ft⋅lbf)

The 9mm Japanese revolver, also known as the 9×22mmR Type 26, was a cartridge similar to the .38 S&W. These cartridges are not interchangeable. The rim diameter is thinner and the chamber pressure is lower than most .38 S&W loads. The cartridge saw service with the Type 26 revolver in the Russo-Japanese War, World War I, and World War II in a limited role. The Type 26 was later replaced as the service pistol of the Imperial Japanese Army by the semi automatic Nambu pistol, which was chambered for the 8x22mm Nambu cartridge.

== See also ==
- List of rimmed cartridges
- List of handgun cartridges
