= E.R. Amantino =

Brazilian firearms manufacturer

E.R. Amantino (Boito)
- Type: private company
- Industry: firearms
- Founded: 1955; 71 years ago
- Founder: Elias Ruas Amantino; João Boito
- Headquarters: Veranópolis, Rio Grande do Sul, Brazil
- Products: hunting and sport shotguns
- Brands: Boito, Stoeger
- Number of employees: ~300 (2010)

E.R. Amantino (also known as Boito) is a Brazilian firearms manufacturer founded in 1955 at the city of Veranópolis, in the state of Rio Grande do Sul, Brazil. The company is well known for its double barrelled shotguns marketed and distributed in the United States under the Stoeger brand.

The company was founded and named after João Boito, an Italian blacksmith living in Brazil that used to manufacture handmade shotguns among his other works. During the 1950s, Boito met Elias Ruas Amantino, a local businessman who proposed a special partnership to establish the E.R. Amantino & Cia Ltda., a local company focused on manufacturing single and double barreled shotguns for hunting purposes. In 1962, the company released their first coach gun model.

In 1977, the company founded its subsidiary Microvera, a metal processing and microfusion specialized plant in charge to produce parts for Boito's shotguns and custom parts for other guns on the South American market.

== International marketing ==
Between the mid-1970s and 1980s, Boito started to export and sell its shotguns in the United States under K-Mart's brand. The company and its models were criticized by the customers due to its low quality products.

Since 2013, it is the official representative of the Italian manufacturer Benelli in the Brazilian market. However, E.R. Amantino exports around 70% of its production to the United States, Australia, Canada, New Zealand, South Africa, and Argentina, among other countries. Boito shotguns can be found in over 24 countries over the world.

== Products ==
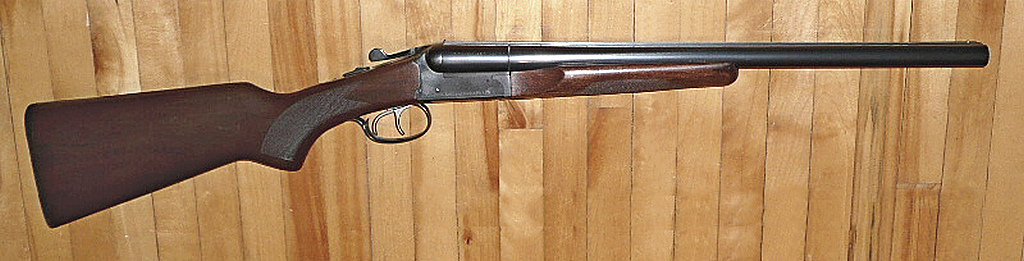
Boito A680 - a double barrel shotgun manufactured in Brazil by E.R. Amantino and marketed in the United States as Stoeger Coach Gun

E.R. Amantino's catalog includes its famous shotguns and firearms, sport shooting and hunting accessories, automated clay pigeon throwers and apparel items. Some of the products made by Boito are:

- Double barrel shotguns
  - A/680 (Stoeger Coach Gun) - 12, 20, 28, 32 and 36 gauge
  - A/681 - 12 and 20 gauge
  - Double Defense - 12 and 20 gauge
  - Miura I - 12, 20, 28, 32 and 36 gauge
  - Miura II (Stoeger Condor)- 12, 20, 28, 32 and 36 gauge
  - ERA 2001 – 12 gauge
  - Over Defense – 12 and 20 gauge
- Single barrel shotguns
  - Reuna – 12, 20, 28, 32 and 36 gauge
  - B300 (Boito Hiker) – 28, 32 and 36 gauge
  - Pistol – 410 gauge
- Pump action shotguns
  - Pump – 12 gauge
