= Stoeger Condor =

- Type: Double-barreled shotgun
- Place of origin: Brazil

Production history
- Manufacturer: E.R. Amantino

Specifications
- Barrel length: 28, 26, 24, 22, or 20 inches
- Caliber: 12, 16, 20 or 28 gauge or .410 bore

The Stoeger Condor is a double-barreled shotgun. It is an over/under gun, with one barrel above the other.

There are several models of Condor, with different features and in various gauges. The standard model has a grade-A walnut stock and fore-end, blued receiver and barrels, a single trigger, and screw-in choke tubes. It has a vented barrel rib and a brass bead front sight. It is chambered to use either 2-¾ inch or 3 inch shells. Opening the action automatically engages the safety mechanism.

In the United States, the Condor is marketed and distributed by Stoeger Industries in Accokeek, Maryland. It is manufactured by E.R. Amantino in Veranópolis, Brazil. The Condor is relatively inexpensive compared to other double barreled shotguns. It is most often used for hunting birds and for clay target games such as trap and skeet.

== Condor Supreme ==
The Stoeger Condor Supreme is a model of Stoeger Condor. The Condor Supreme has a grade-AA walnut stock and fore-end, and high-luster bluing on the receiver and barrels. It also has automatic ejectors, and a selectable trigger that allows the shooter to choose which barrel will fire first.

== Condor Outback ==
The Condor Outback model has 20-inch barrels. It has rifle style sights, with a fixed blade front sight and a notched rear sight. It is chambered in 12-gauge, 20-gauge 410-bore, and 28-gauge. It has been manufactured with two different finishes – walnut stock and fore-end with blued metal, and black hardwood stock and fore-end with nickel-plated metal.
