= Model 08 Semi-Automatic Pistol 0.3 Inch =

German WW2 handgun

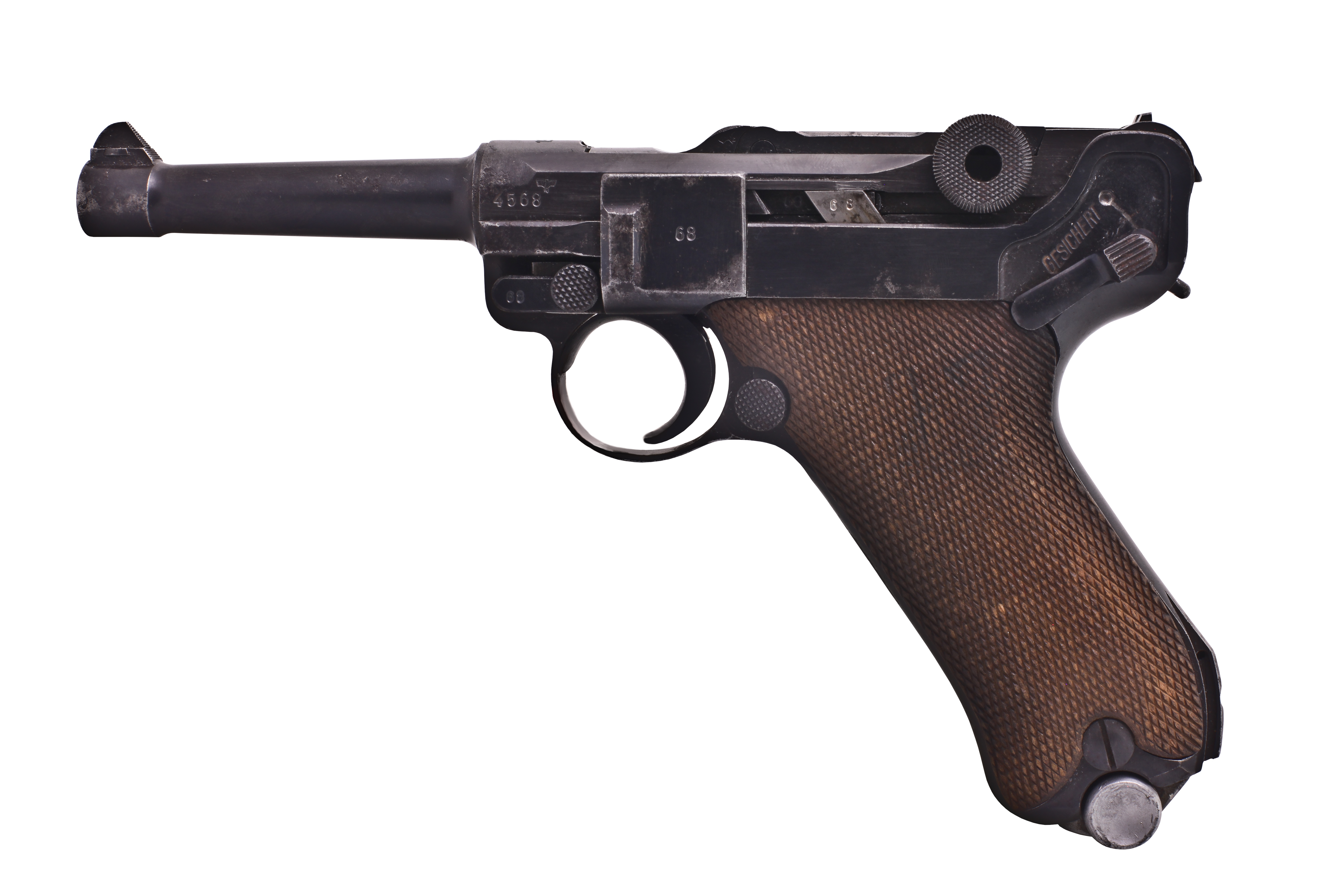
- Wehrmacht P08 ordnance model (Collection Paul Regnier, Lausanne, Switzerland)
- Type: Semi-automatic pistol
- Place of origin: Germany

Service history
- In service: 1935-1945
- Used by: Wehrmacht; Waffen-SS
- Wars: Spanish Civil War; World War II

Production history
- Designer: Georg Luger
- Designed: 1906
- Manufacturer: Deutsche Waffen und Munitionsfabriken
- Unit cost: 35 ℛ︁ℳ︁ (1943)
- Produced: 1935-1945

Specifications
- Length: 222 mm (8.7 in)
- Barrel length: 100 mm (3.9 in)
- Cartridge: 9×19mm Parabellum
- Action: Toggle-locked, short recoil
- Rate of fire: 116 rpm (semi-automatic)
- Muzzle velocity: 350–400 m/s (1,100–1,300 ft/s) (9mm, 100 mm short barrel)
- Effective firing range: 55 yd (50 m)
- Feed system: 8-round detachable box magazine
- Sights: Iron sights

The Model 08 Semi-Automatic Pistol 0.3 Inch is a semi-automatic pistol used by the German Wehrmacht and the Luftwaffe during World War II. A variant of the Luger pistol issued to the Wehrmacht, the Heer, Kriegsmarine and the Waffen-SS used it as an officers' pistol, while the Luftwaffe used it as a self-defense weapon for aircrew shot down over enemy territory.
