= Ian V. Hogg =

British military historian and author (1926–2002)

Ian Vernon Hogg (1 January 1926 – 7 March 2002) was a British author of books on firearms, artillery, ammunition, and fortification, as well as biographies of several famous general officers. During his career he wrote, co-wrote, edited, or co-edited about 150 books and sold well over 1 million copies.

== Biographical sketch ==
Born on 1 January 1926, Ian V. Hogg enlisted in the Royal Artillery of the British Army in April 1945. During World War II he served in Europe and in eastern Asia. After the war he remained in the military. In the early 1950s, he served in the Korean War. Altogether he served in the military for 27 years. Upon retiring in 1972, he held the appointment of Master Gunner at the Royal Military College of Science, where he taught on the subjects of firearms, artillery, and their ammunition and use.

His first books were published in the late 1960s while he was still an instructor. After retiring from the military, he pursued the career of military author and historian. He was editor of Jane's Infantry Weapons from 1972 to 1994. He worked with a skilled artist, John Batchelor, to ensure that his books were well illustrated with cutaway diagrams. He contributed articles to a variety of journals, and his books have been translated into a dozen languages. In Brazil, Argentina, and Spain his translated books are popular among military circles.

Hogg has been described by publishing people who worked with him as "an unassuming man, with a gift to pass on [his] knowledge at any level, and often with a dry humour", which is a gift that most of his readers can readily discern. He was also respected for his professionalism as an author.

Hogg was a frequent guest on the History Channel's Tales of the Gun and a contributor to the A&E channel's 1996 series The Story of the Gun, as well as other military-related television programs. He was described as being "one of the most objective researchers on firearms and their origins".

== Death ==
He died on 7 March 2002 aged 76.

== Bibliography ==
- Hogg, Ian V. (1970). Barrage: The Guns in Action. Ballantine Books. OCLC 123916.
- —— (1970). German Secret Weapons of World War 2. Arms and Armour Press. ISBN 085368-053-1.
- —— (1970). Military Pistols and Revolvers. Arco Publishing.
- —— (1971). The Guns 1914–18. The Pan/Ballantine History of the First World War, Book No 5. Pan Books. ISBN 978-0-330-23838-0.
- ——; Thurston, L. F. (1972). British Artillery Weapons & Ammunition 1914–1918. Ian Allan.
- ——; Batchelor, John H. (1972). Artillery. Scribner. ISBN 978-0-684-13092-7.
- ——; Batchelor, John H. (1975). Armies of the American Revolution. Prentice-Hall. ISBN 978-0-13-046573-3.
- —— (1978). Anti-Aircraft: A History of Air Defence. MacDonald and Jane's. ISBN 978-0-354-01163-1.
- ——; Batchelor, John H. (1978). Naval Gun. Blandford Press. ISBN 978-0-7137-0905-6.
- —— (1978). The Complete Illustrated Encyclopedia of the World's Firearms. A & W Publishers. ISBN 978-0-89479-031-7.
- Koch, Hannsjoachim Wolfgang; Hogg, Ian V.; Gwynn-Jones, P. L. (1978). Medieval Warfare. Prentice-Hall. ISBN 978-0-13-573600-5.
- —— (1978). Anti-Aircraft: A History of Air Defence. MacDonald and Jane's. ISBN 978-0-354-01163-1.
- ——; Weeks, John S. (1980). The Illustrated Encyclopedia of Military Vehicles. Prentice-Hall. ISBN 978-0-13-450817-7.
- —— (1982). The Biography of General George S. Patton. Magna Book. ISBN 978-0-948509-40-7.
- —— (1983). Israeli War Machine. Chartwell Books. ISBN 978-0-89009-678-9.
- —— (1985). The Illustrated Encyclopedia of Ammunition. Colporteur Press. ISBN 978-0-86399-087-8.
- —— (1985). Tanks. Lerner Publishing Group. ISBN 978-0-8225-1378-0.
- —— (1987). Weapons of the Civil War. Random House. ISBN 978-0-517-63606-0.
- —— (1991). Weapons of the Gulf War. Random House. ISBN 978-0-517-06672-0.
- —— (1993). Robert E. Lee. Longmeadow Press. ISBN 978-0-681-41597-3.
- —— (1996). Tank Killing: Anti-tank Warfare by Men and Machines. London: Sidgwick & Jackson. ISBN 978-0-283-06285-8.
- —— (1998). Historical Dictionary of World War I. Scarecrow Press. ISBN 978-0-8108-3372-2.
- —— (1998). Allied Artillery of World War Two. Crowood. ISBN 978-1-86126-165-6.
- ——; Winchester, Jim (2000). The World War II Tank Guide. Book Sales, Incorporated. ISBN 978-0-7858-1229-6.
- —— (2001). Submachine Guns. Greenhill Books. ISBN 978-1-85367-448-8.
- ——; Hutchins, Ray (2002). Counter-Terrorism Equipment. Greenhill Books. ISBN 978-1-85367-497-6.
- ——; Walter, John (2004). Pistols of the World. David & Charles. ISBN 0-87349-460-1.
- ——; Walter, John (2006). Infantry Support Weapons: Mortars, Missiles and Machine Guns. Greenhill Books. ISBN 978-185367-484-6.
- —— (2009). The A to Z of World War I. Scarecrow Press. ISBN 978-0-8108-7025-3.
- —— (2013). German Artillery of World War Two. Pen & Sword Books Limited. ISBN 978-1-84832-725-2.
