= Beretta Holding =

Italian defence company

- Type: Private
- Founded: 2018
- Headquarters: Luxembourg
- Key people: Pietro Gussalli Beretta CEO; Franco Gussalli Beretta Exec VP
- Products: Small arms; Sporting goods; Clothing & accessories; Optoelectronics
- Brands: Beretta; Benelli; Franchi; A. Uberti; Stoeger; Sako; Tikka; Chapuis Armes; Steiner; Burris
- Revenue: ▲€1.4 billion (2022)
- Operating income: ▲€216.60 million (2021)
- Net income: ▲€145.90 million (2021)
- Total equity: ▲€901.50 million (2021)
- Number of employees: ▲3,388 (2021)
- Website: berettaholding.com

Beretta Holding is headquartered in Luxembourg. It is a holding company for the Italian industrial group and holds direct or indirect participation in 26 companies, including Beretta. The eponymous company is managed by fifteenth-generation descendants of Maestro Bartolomeo Beretta, progenitor of a firearms manufacturing dynasty.

== Subsidiaries ==
=== Europe ===
Luxembourg is Beretta Holding's headquarters. Beretta Holding holds the Fabbrica d’Armi Pietro Beretta company, as well as Italian replica firearms company A. Uberti. Beretta also holds two other Italian companies, Benelli Armi in Urbino and Meccanica Del Sarca in Pietramurata, Trentino.

In addition to its operations in Italy, Beretta holds several European companies, including Beretta Hellas in Athens, Espingardaria Belga in Lisbon, Holland & Holland in London, and Beretta Benelli Iberica in Trespuentes, Spain. Beretta has three subsidiaries in France, Chapuis Armes in Saint-Bonnet-le-Château and Humbert CTTS in Veauche, along with Cougar France which operates the Beretta Gallery retail store in Paris. Beretta has one Swiss subsidiary, Outdoor Enterprise in Muralto, and two in Germany, Manfred Alberts GmbH in Wiehl-Bielstein and Steiner-Optik GmbH in Bayreuth. In northern Europe, Beretta has the Finnish firearms manufacturer SAKO as well as UK distributor GMK Ltd, which owns the Beretta Gallery in London.

=== North America ===
Beretta USA was founded in 1972 and based in Accokeek, Maryland. It manufactures military, police, and civilian pistols. United States sales produce over half of Beretta's revenue. In May 2013 the company announced that, despite disagreements with the State of Maryland over recently enacted changes to Maryland gun control laws, it would not relocate its Accokeek facility. As of 2014, the facility employed around 400 workers.

In January 2014 Beretta announced the construction of a design and production facility in Gallatin, Tennessee to expand its US operations. On 22 July 2014, in a reversal of their 2013 decision to keep some production operations in Accokeek, Beretta announced that it would move all manufacturing from Maryland to the Gallatin facility, which was originally expected to manufacture machinery and new products only. Beretta stated that the decision was in response to further restrictions on firearms manufacturing being considered by the Maryland Legislature. The new US$45 million facility, on a 100 acres (40 hectares) site in the Nashville area, was scheduled to be completed in early 2015 and ultimately employ 300 workers. However, construction was delayed by weather.

Then-CEO Ugo Gussalli Beretta personally visited the Gallatin site and stated, regarding the new facility, "In return for our investment in jobs, facilities, and assistance to the local economy, we ask for respect and a supportive business climate. We deserve such respect. We make the standard sidearm for the U.S. armed forces. We also make firearms that police and consumers use to save their lives and the lives of others." Beretta began moving equipment into the Gallatin plant once it received a certificate of occupancy in December 2015, and by January 2016 the plant was partially operational. On 15 April, the company celebrated its factory opening with a ribbon-cutting ceremony officiated by Tennessee Gov. Bill Haslam, Ugo Gussalli Beretta and his sons, Pietro and Franco.

The main office of Beretta USA remains in Accokeek, as well as unspecified gunsmithing and repair operations. Beretta's I.T. support organization, 3 Arrows Services, remains in Accokeek, as does Stoeger Industries. Stoeger Canada is situated in Whitby, Ontario. The offices of Benelli USA are located in Accokeek with a warehouse located in Pocomoke City, Maryland. Other North American companies include Cougar Corp., which operates the Beretta Gallery showcase store in New York City, and two optics manufacturers, Burris Company in Greeley, Colorado and Steiner eOptics (formerly Laser Devices Inc.) in Monterey, California

Through its Steiner subsidiary, on 31 December 2015, Beretta Holding acquired two electro-optics companies: STS in Beavercreek, Ohio; and Diffraction Ltd in Burlington, Vermont.

=== Others ===
The Beretta Defense Technologies (BDT) international business unit was created in 2012 as an alliance of four companies owned by Beretta Holding (Beretta, Benelli, Sako and Steiner) to serve government, military and law enforcement customers.

Other International holdings include Turkish firearms manufacturer and distributor Stoeger Silah Sanayi in Istanbul, distributor Russian Eagle in Moscow, NightLaser Technologies in São Paulo and WanCai optical company in Chongqing.

As of March 25, 2026, Beretta Holding S.A. owns 9.95% of Sturm, Ruger & Co., making it the largest shareholder. Beretta has proposed acquiring an additional 20.05% stake to bring its total ownership to approximately 30%, though the tender offer faces resistance from the Ruger Board.
