= Stoeger Coach Gun =

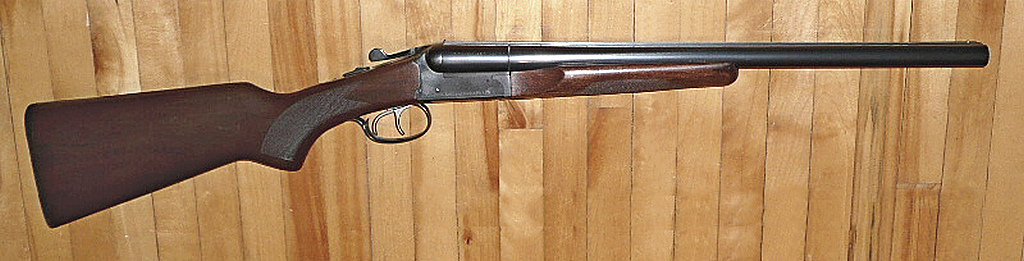
- Type: Shotgun
- Place of origin: Brazil

Production history
- Manufacturer: E.R. Amantino
- Variants: Coach Gun; Coach Gun Supreme

Specifications
- Mass: 6½ pounds
- Length: 36½ inches
- Barrel length: ! 20 or 24 inches
- Caliber: 12 gauge
- Action: Break-action

The Stoeger Coach Gun is a side-by-side double-barreled shotgun. It is marketed and distributed by Stoeger Industries in Accokeek, Maryland. It is manufactured by E.R. Amantino (Boito) in Veranópolis, Brazil.

While suitable for bird hunting, clay target shooting or home defense, it is primarily designed for cowboy action shooting. As the name implies, it is a coach gun style shotgun, similar to those used to defend stagecoaches in the American Old West.

== Features ==
The Stoeger Coach Gun has been produced in 12 gauge. The chambers are three inches long, to accommodate either 2¾ inch or 3 inch shells. Barrel lengths include 18, 20 and 24 inch. The gun has a raised center rib with a brass bead front sight. The Coach Gun has dual triggers, one for each barrel. The safety mechanism is located on the tang, on the upper rear part of the receiver. Opening the action automatically engages the safety. To comply with cowboy action shooting regulations, the gun does not have ejectors, but it does have an extractor.

== Models ==
- Coach Gun – The standard model has fixed chokes, one Improved Cylinder and one Modified, and does not have a recoil pad. Different variations have a hardwood, walnut, or synthetic stock and fore-end, and a blued, matte nickel, or polished nickel receiver and barrels. Most versions have an American style pistol grip stock, but the Coach Gun has also been produced with an English style straight stock.
- Coach Gun Supreme – The Coach Gun Supreme has screw-in choke tubes, and is equipped with a recoil pad. It features an AA-grade walnut stock and fore-end. Different versions have blued, nickel-plated, stainless steel receivers and barrels.
- Double Defense – The recently introduced Double Defense is tactically designed for home defense. It has a black matte finish and two picatinny rails for add-on tactical accessories, such as a laser sight or flashlight. The gun has a single trigger, ported barrels, internal hammer design and a fixed Improved Cylinder choke.
