= Stoeger Luger =

Stoeger STLR-4
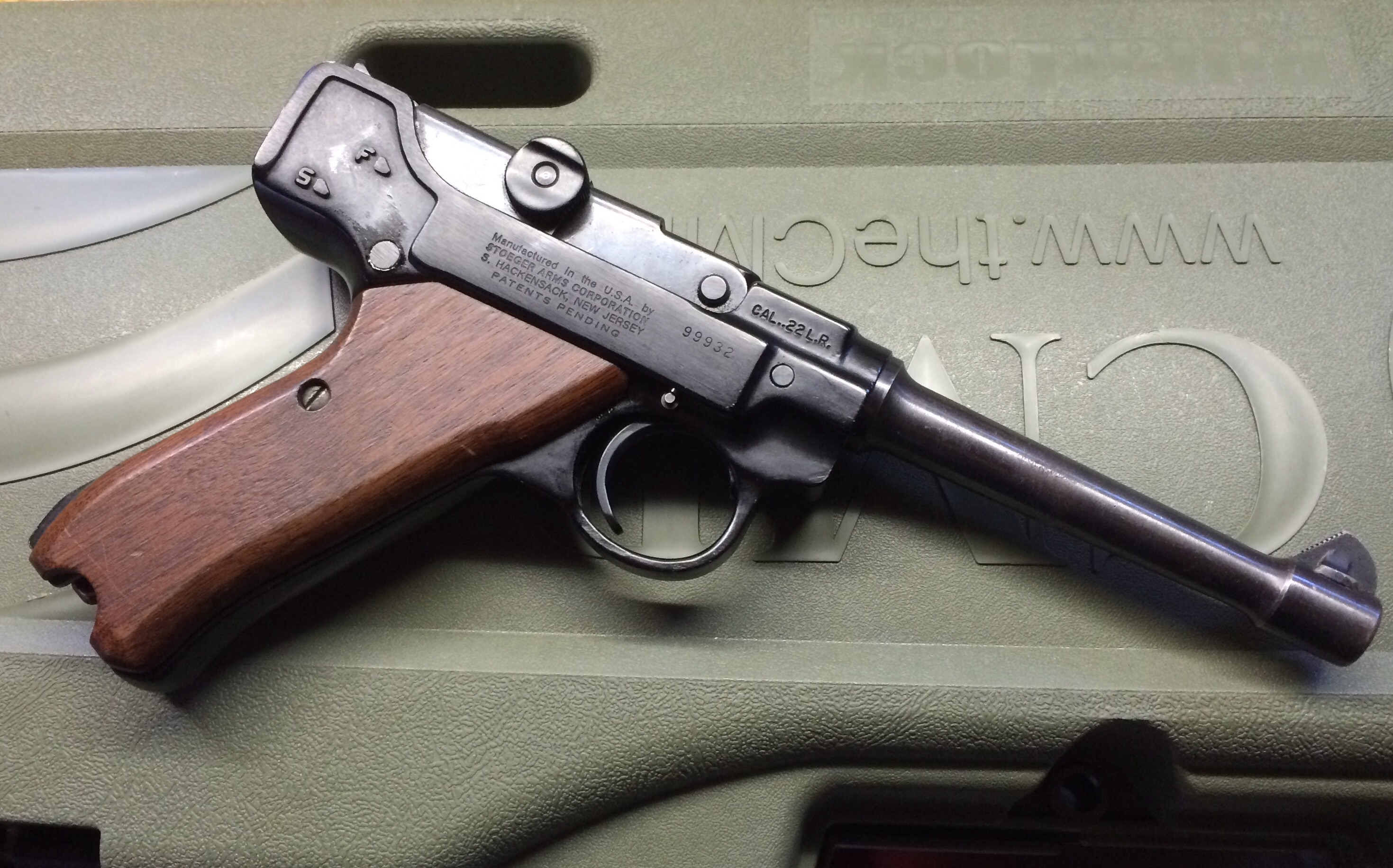
- Place of origin: United States

Production history
- Designer: Stoeger
- Designed: 1969
- Manufacturer: Stoeger
- Produced: 1969—1985

Specifications
- Mass: 30 ounces
- Shell: .22 LR

Stoeger STLR-4 is a .22 caliber 10-round, blow-back operated, semi-automatic pistol introduced by Stoeger in 1969 and was discontinued in 1985.

== History ==
The Stoeger Luger was of the same general pattern as the original Luger pistol, but it used a simplified version of the toggle lock, which does not actually 'lock' the action at the moment of firing, but is blowback-operated much like other .22LR autoloading pistols. The gun was designed by Gary Willhelm and manufactured from 1969 to 1985. The top of the toggle has a logo of two birds (Eagles), each facing in the same direction inside of a circle. One side of the frame has “LUGER” in a floral oval. The other side of the frame is marked “Manufactured in the U.S.A. by / Stoeger Arms Corporation / S. Hackensack New Jersey / Patents Pending”, the serial number, and “Cal..22 LR”. It has a barrel length of 4.5 in (11 cm) or 5.5 in (140 mm). The gun is mounted with a front blade in a dovetail slot. Rear sight could be either a rear raised square notch type or an adjustable sight attached to the frame.

== Design ==
The first Stoeger Lugers were produced in 1969 with aluminum forging/machined frames (7075 T6 aluminum). Beginning in 1980 the receiver material was changed to steel. One way to identify the frame type is by the safety selector markings. Steel frames will have a red and green painted indented spot while the aluminum frames will have raised lettering that says Fire or Safe. Use of a magnet is another way to identify the composition of the pistol frame

Most of the time, two basic models were offered, a standard and a target model, although in rare instances, there were some that came with an extra long barrel and an elevation-adjustable rear sight.

On both the standard and target models, the front post sight height is fixed and can be drifted for windage adjustments.

The rear sight on the standard model is raised square notch type. The standard model had non-adjustable sights, but the rear sight on the target model had an extension at the rear of the frame for an adjustable target rear sight. Both models were available with 4.5 inch (most common) or a 5.5 inch (less common) barrels. A few models were imported (or at least distributed) through Navy Arms and had 9-in barrels, and these had a rear sight built in (not an extension like the "target" models) that could be adjusted for elevation by means of a screw, but these were very uncommon. The barrel on all models inserted into the front of the receiver and was secured by a cross-pin.

A frustration often reported by shooters was that the pistols were "finicky" about ammunition—that they would only function well if extra high-velocity ammunition was used. This tended to contribute to a lack of popularity, because it meant that more expensive ammunition was always required. Apparently, standard velocity ammunition did not create sufficient back pressure when the pistol was fired to fully drive back the toggle and extract the spent cartridge case—especially after firing several rounds, which tended to build up residue in the chamber. In all probability, it was that the chamber of the Stoeger .22 Luger, having been manufactured in Europe, was of a size to accommodate .22 ammunition that was also manufactured in Europe, which tended to be imperceptibly smaller than US manufactured .22 ammo. The Stoeger had no problem cycling with European ammo, but standard velocity US ammo would tend to "stick" in the chamber. This effect can be remedied by having a competent gunsmith to very slightly ream (or even just polish) the chamber.

The toggle (bolt) remains open after the last round is fired.

The pistol grips sometimes came as checkered walnut or plastic (less common) or smooth walnut without checkering (most common).
