= Steiner-Optik =

German optical equipment manufacturer

Steiner-Optik (also rendered as Steiner Optics) is a manufacturer of optical equipment for the military, hunting and marine sector. The company is headquartered in Bayreuth, northern Bavaria, and has been part of the Beretta Group since 2008. Steiner manufactures products for the civilian market as well as for the defense industry. Its product range includes binoculars for military and police use, rifle scope sights and spotting scopes for hunting, seafaring, outdoor and ornithology. Every year 200,000 to 250,000 binoculars are produced, of which 80% are exported.

== History ==
The company was founded in 1947 by Karl Steiner, and the first product of the company was the Steinette camera. In 1955, the company changed focus to production of binoculars. In 1965, Steiner was awarded a contract with the West German Bundeswehr, which it supplied with the service binoculars called Steiner 8×30 FERO-D12 Bundeswehr Fernglas (German Army Binoculars) between 1966 and 1972. Steiner was the first company to produce nitrogen-filled binoculars. In 1989, Steiner-Optik received by its own account until then the world's largest order for military binoculars, which included the delivery of 72,000 M22 7×50 binoculars to the US Army. Other innovations by Steiner optics included the first binoculars with bearing compass and the first binoculars with laser protection filters.

== Product range ==
=== Binoculars ===
- Wildlife
- SkyHawk 4.0
- Blue Horizons
- Safari UltraSharp
- Navigator Pro
- Commander
- Commander Global
- Observer
- Ranger Extreme
- Nighthunter
- LRF 1700

=== Hunting rifle scopes ===
- Ranger
- Ranger BC
- Nighthunter

=== Tactical rifle scopes ===
- T5Xi
- M series

=== Red Dot Sights ===
- MRS
- MPS

=== Lasers ===
- DBAL series (including AN/PEQ-15A DBAL-A2)
- OTAL series
- CQBL-1
- SBAL series

=== Night vision devices ===
- AN/PVS-21

== See also ==
- Swarovski Optik
