= Luger pistol =

German semi-automatic pistol

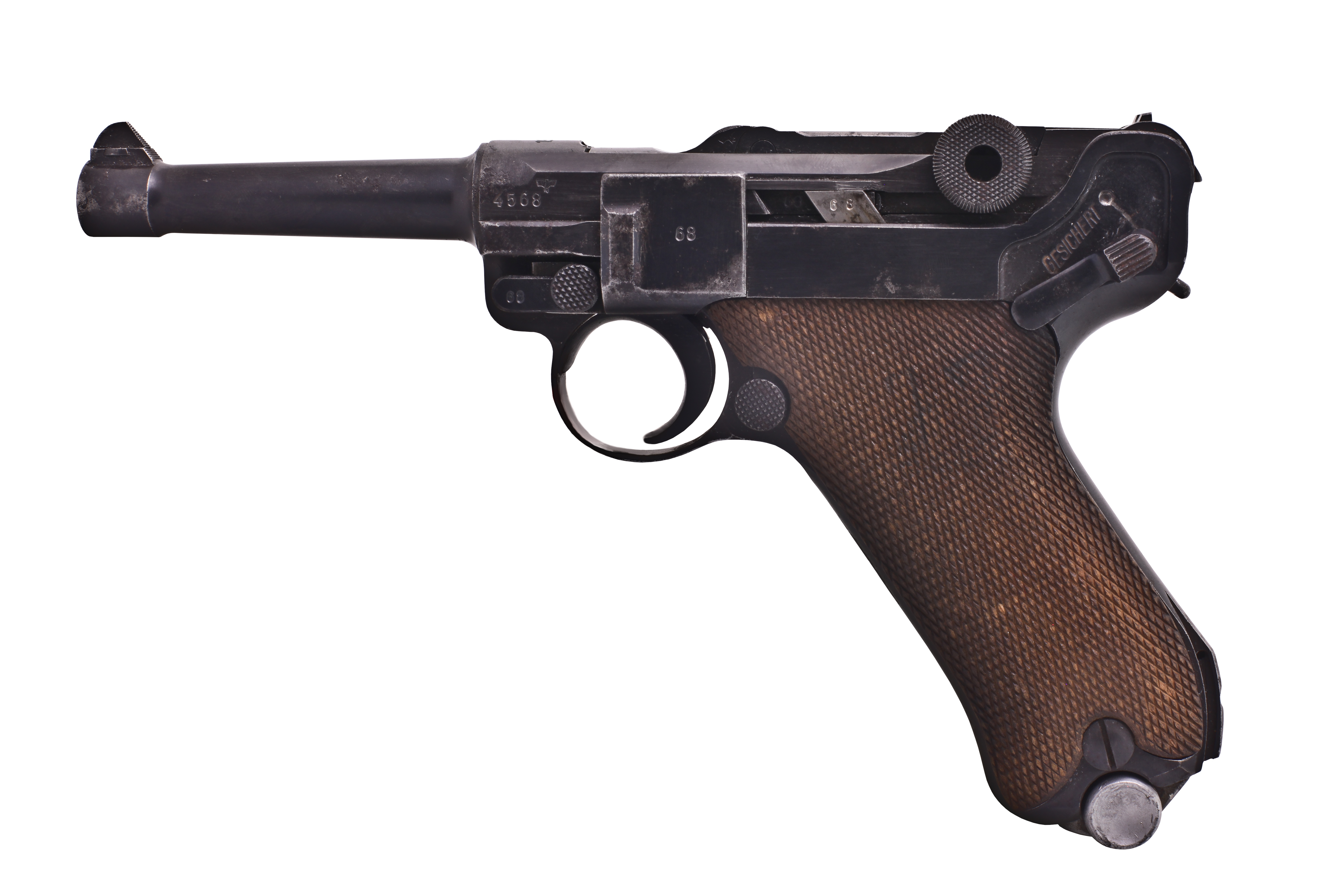
- Wehrmacht P08 ordnance model
- Type: Semi-automatic pistol
- Place of origin: German Empire

Service history
- In service: 1904–1953 (Germany); 1900–1970s (other countries)
- Used by: See Users
- Wars: Boxer Rebellion; Philippine-American War; Maji-Maji Rebellion; 1907 Expedition Against the Cuamato; Balkan Wars; Contestado War; World War I; Warlord Era; German Revolution; Irish War of Independence; Russian Civil War; Finnish Civil War; Irish Civil War; Tenente Revolts; 1923 Revolution; Chinese Civil War; Revolution of 1930; Constitutionalist Revolution; Chaco War; Spanish Civil War; World War II; Second Sino-Japanese War; 1947–1949 Palestine war; Indonesian National Revolution; First Indochina War; Algerian War; 1958 Lebanon crisis; Vietnam War (limited use); Laotian Civil War; Lebanese Civil War; Portuguese Colonial War; Rhodesian Bush War; The Troubles; Operation Urgent Fury (limited use)

Production history
- Designer: Georg Luger
- Designed: 1898
- Manufacturer: Deutsche Waffen und Munitionsfabriken; Imperial Arsenals of Erfurt; Simson; Heinrich Krieghoff Waffenfabrik; Mauser; Vickers Ltd (final assembly only); Waffenfabrik Bern
- Unit cost: 35 ℛ︁ℳ︁ (1943) (equivalent to €72 in 2021)
- Produced: 1900–1953
- No. built: 3,000,000

Specifications
- Mass: 871 g (1 lb 15 oz)
- Length: 222 mm (8.7 in)
- Barrel length: 120 mm (4.7 in) (Pistole 00); 100 mm (3.9 in) (Pistole 08); 200 mm (7.9 in) (Lange Pistole 1908)
- Cartridge: 7.65×21mm Parabellum; 9×19mm Parabellum
- Action: Toggle-locked, short recoil
- Rate of fire: 116 rpm (semi-automatic)
- Muzzle velocity: 350–400 m/s (1,100–1,300 ft/s) (9mm, 100 mm short barrel)
- Effective firing range: 50 m (55 yd) (9mm, 100 mm short barrel)
- Feed system: 8-round detachable box magazine
- Sights: Iron sights

The Pistole Parabellum or Parabellum-Pistole (Pistol Parabellum), commonly known as just the Luger or Luger P08, is a toggle-locked recoil-operated semi-automatic pistol. The Luger was produced in several models and by several nations from 1898 to 1949.

The design was patented by Georg Luger. It was meant to be an improvement of the Borchardt C-93 pistol, and was initially produced as the Parabellum Automatic Pistol, Borchardt-Luger System by the German arms manufacturer Deutsche Waffen- und Munitionsfabriken (DWM). The first production model was known as the Modell 1900 Parabellum. It was followed by the "Marinepistole 1904" for the Imperial German Navy.

The Luger was officially adopted by the Swiss military in 1900, the Imperial German Navy in 1906, and the German Army in 1908. The Luger was the standard service pistol of Switzerland, Portugal, the Netherlands, Brazil, Bolivia, and Bulgaria. It was widely used in other countries as a military service pistol and by police forces. In the German Army service, it was adopted in a slightly modified form as the Pistole Modell 1908 (Pistole 08) in caliber 9×19mm Parabellum. The Model 08 was eventually succeeded by the Walther P38.

The Luger is well known for its wide use by Germany during World War I and World War II, along with the interwar Weimar Republic and the postwar East German Volkspolizei.

The name Parabellum, which also featured in DWM's telegraphic address, comes from the Latin phrase Si vis pacem, para bellum; "If you wish for peace, prepare for war."

== History ==
In 1897, after the success of the Borchardt C-93, as the first mass-produced semi-automatic pistol, the Swiss military began to look for a semi-automatic pistol to replace their issued pistol, the Ordonnanzrevolver 1872. Georg Luger, working for the German company Deutsche Waffen- und Munitionsfabriken, provided the Borchardt-Luger design, which during Swiss military trials, was found to be more accurate and reliable than competing designs such as the Mannlicher M1901 and Mauser C96. 20 examples of the Borchardt-Luger were sent to Switzerland in 1899, and after a revision to reduce its weight, was adopted the following year as the Ordonnanzpistole 1900. The Luger remained in Swiss service until 1949, when it was replaced by the SIG P210.

=== German adoption trials ===
In 1898, Germany adopted a total of 145 C93 pistols, but found that it jammed too often to be effective. In 1901, testing of the Luger commenced, alongside an improved version of the C93, in which the Luger was found to be both lighter and more reliable. Following a change in caliber from 7.65×21mm Parabellum to 9×19mm Parabellum, the Luger was adopted by the Imperial German Navy as the Selbstlade-Pistole Modell 1904, and later simply the Pistole 1904. The Army delayed their adoption because Mauser requested time to develop a new pistol of their own, which was finished in 1907. However, the new pistol was still found to be less desirable than the Luger, and on 22 August 1908, Kaiser Wilhelm II signed an order for 50,000 Lugers for the German Army, with orders to produce a total of 170,000.

=== U.S. trials ===
In 1901, DWM sent two Lugers to the United States, also interested in a semi-automatic pistol. After doing well in testing, a total of 1,000 pistols and 200,000 rounds were purchased for use by the Military Academy at West Point, and several forts. The Luger was unpopular, with most troops preferring their .38 Long Colt revolvers, resulting in the Luger's recall in 1905.

In 1906, the United States evaluated several domestic and foreign-made semi-automatic pistols, including the Colt M1900, Steyr Mannlicher M1894, and an entry from Mauser. This was in response to combat reports which stated that the .38 caliber revolvers used in the 1899–1902 Philippine Insurrection lacked stopping power. Due to the findings in the Thompson–LaGarde Tests, the military required a handgun in .45 (11.25mm) caliber.

In 1906 and 1907, the U.S. Army held trials for a large-caliber semi-automatic pistol. At least two, and possibly three, Parabellum Model 1902/1906 pattern pistols were brought to the U.S. by Georg Luger for the 1907 trials, each chambered in .45 ACP caliber. Prior to his arrival, the U.S. Frankford Arsenal had provided Luger with 5,000 rounds of .45 ammunition for experimentation and to serve as a guide for chambering measurements. Finding numerous defects in this prototype ammunition (U.S. authorities later were forced to produce new ammunition for the 1907 trials), Luger had DWM pull the bullets of these cartridges and had them re-loaded with a special faster-burning powder in new brass cases. Luger brought 746 rounds of this new ammunition to the March 1907 trials with his .45 Luger pistol. Two test .45 Luger pistols, bearing serial numbers 1 and 2, are known to have been used in the 1907 tests. Although the .45 Luger passed the firing tests, it was ranked below the Colt/Browning and Savage pistols in number of malfunctions and misfires, though Army officials conceded that the .45 Luger performed satisfactorily with the DWM-loaded ammunition: "The Luger automatic pistol, although it possesses manifest advantages in many particulars, is not recommended for service tests because its certainty of action, even with Luger ammunition, is not considered satisfactory, because the final seating of the cartridge is not by positive spring action, and because the powder stated by Mr. Luger to be necessary for its satisfactory use, is not now obtainable in this country." DWM and Luger later rejected an invitation by Army officials to produce 200 pistols in .45 caliber for further competition against the Colt and Savage submissions, at which point DWM effectively withdrew from the U.S. trials.

The fate of the .45 Luger, serial number 1 is unknown, as it was not returned and is believed to have been destroyed during testing. The .45 Luger prototype serial number 2, believed to have been a back-up to Serial Number 1, survived the 1907 trials and is in private ownership. Its rarity gives its value of around US$1 million at the time the "Million Dollar Guns" episode of the History Channel's Tales of the Gun was filmed, recheck by Guns & Ammo as of 1994. At least two .45 caliber Luger pistols were manufactured later for possible commercial or military sales; one is exhibited at the R. W. Norton Art Gallery, in Shreveport, Louisiana. The other was sold in 2010 and remains in a private collection.

=== German combat use ===
The first known instance of the Luger being used in combat was during the Maji Maji Rebellion in 1905-1907. Therein, it was somewhat poorly-received because it was thought to be too heavy to be used quickly, in particular because the grip safety had to be held tightly, reducing accuracy. This led to the removal of the safety in the P08 model.

At the beginning of World War I, not all units of the German Army had been equipped with the Luger, leading to an acceleration in production. Alongside the P08, Germany also developed the LP08, a version with a stock and longer barrel that could also accept drum magazines. The LP08 was used by the Luftstreitkräfte during the early days of the war, before planes were equipped with machine guns, although due to a lack of pre-war production, the LP08 was much less commonly used than the P08. The main user of the LP08 was the Army, who used its drum magazine to deliver a high rate of fire at a close range, a concept which would lead to the development of the Stormtroopers and the MP 18. After the end of the war, Germany signed the Treaty of Versailles, which restricted the size of their army –the treaty limited the German Army 50,000 pistols, and prohibited submachine guns and pistols with stocks altogether.

As the Luger was expensive to produce, Germany started to look for a replacement as early as 1927, settling on the Walther P38 in 1938, which offered similar performance to the Luger, but took almost half the time to produce. Moving the production lines to the P38 once World War II started took longer than expected, leading to the P08 remaining in production until September 1942, and pre-existing copies remained in service until the end of the war. In East Germany, the P08 was used by the Volkspolizei, mostly from ex-Nazi stocks, but they produced a small number up until 1953.

== Design details ==
Luger toggle-lock action

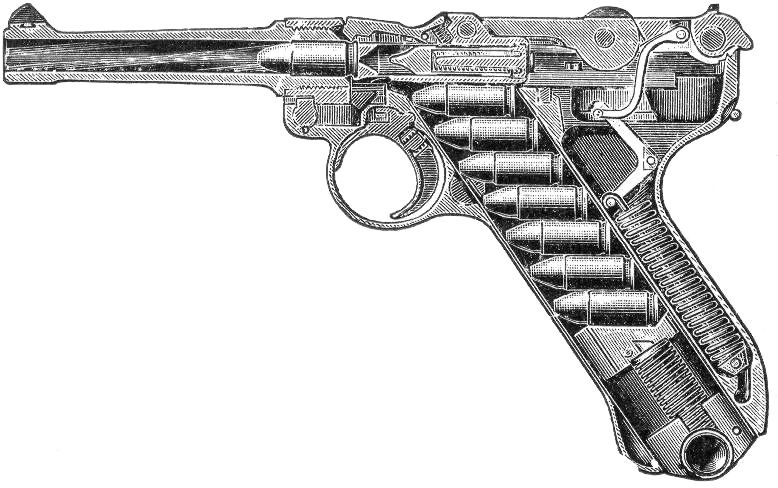
Cutaway drawing of the Luger pistol from Georg Luger's 1908 9 mm patent.

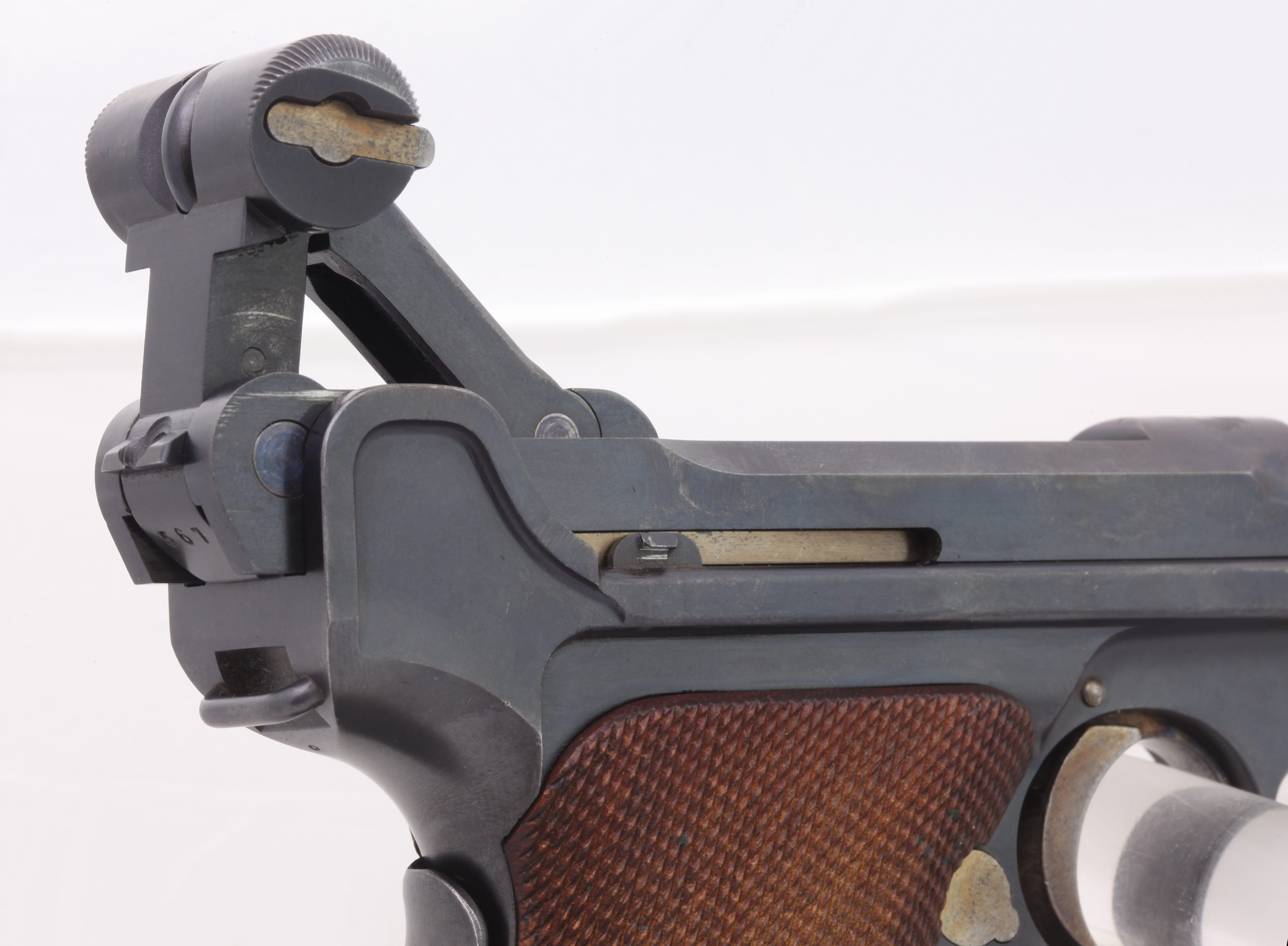
Toggle-lock action with the knee joint bent upwards

The Luger has a toggle-lock action that uses a jointed arm to lock, as opposed to the slide actions of many other semi-automatic pistols, such as the M1911. After a round is fired, the barrel and toggle assembly travel roughly 13 mm (0.5 in) rearward due to recoil, both locked together at this point. The toggle strikes a cam built into the frame, causing the knee joint to hinge and the toggle and breech assembly to unlock. The barrel strikes the frame and stops its rearward movement, but the toggle assembly continues moving, bending the knee joint upwards, extracting the spent casing from the chamber, and ejecting it. The toggle and breech assembly then travel forward under spring tension and the next round is loaded from the magazine into the chamber. The entire sequence occurs in a fraction of a second and contributes to the above average mud resistance of the pistol.

This mechanism works well for higher-pressure cartridges, but cartridges loaded to a lower pressure can cause the pistol to malfunction because they do not generate enough recoil to work the action fully. This results in the breech block either not clearing the top cartridge of the magazine or becoming jammed open on the cartridge's base. This malfunction with under-powered cartridges does occur with Browning-type and other pistol designs as well, but the Luger is sensitive to cartridges other than the brass-cased ammunition that it was designed to use.

Submachine guns were found to be effective in trench warfare during World War I, and experiments were conducted to convert various types of pistols to fully automatic machine pistols, including the P08. The Luger proved to have an excessive rate of fire in full-automatic mode, however, as did the Mauser C96. The 'snail drum' magazine for the MP 18, which was used by German Stormtroopers towards the end of the war, was originally designed for the Artillery Luger.

== Production ==
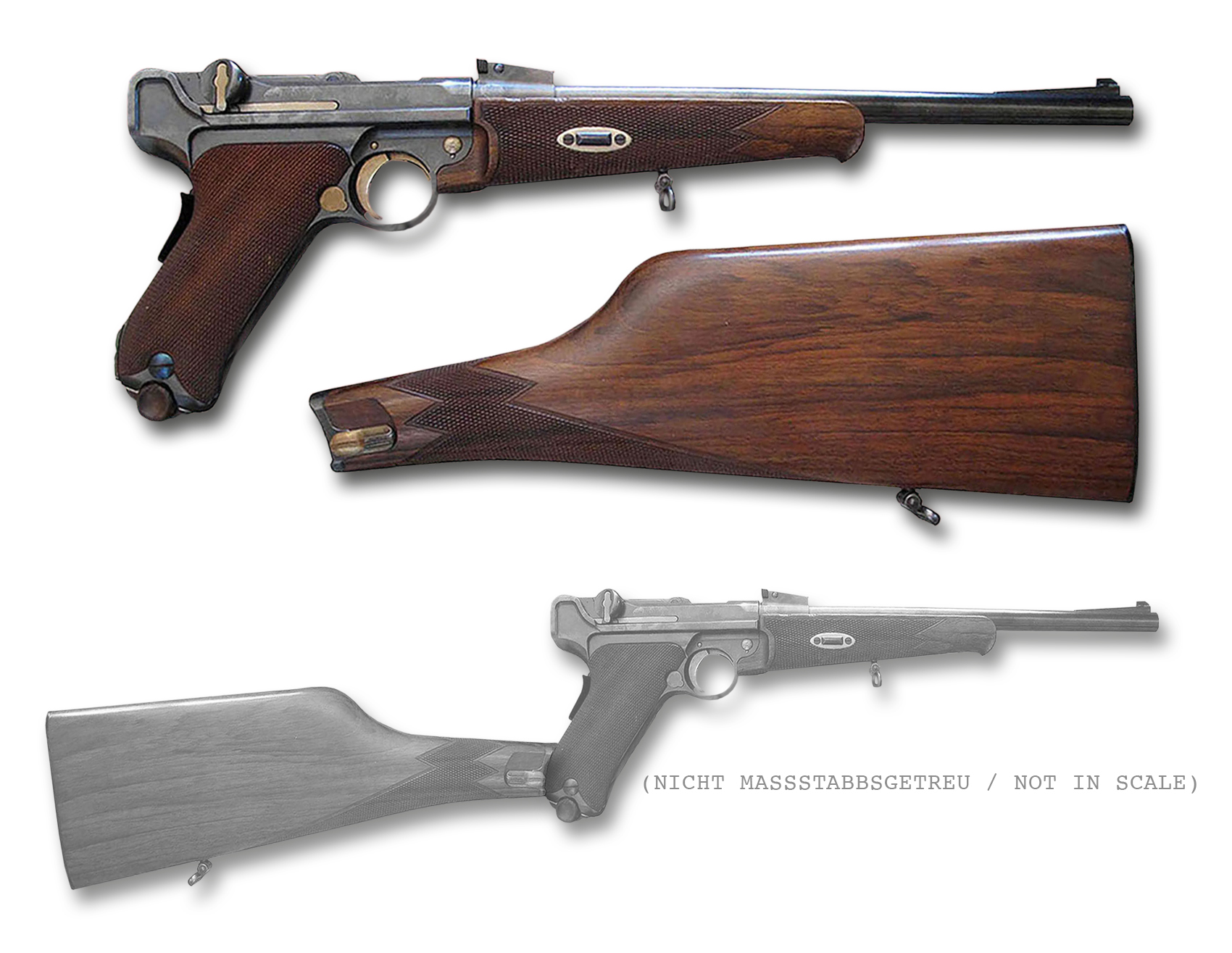
Luger Model 1900 pistol carbine

Luger pistols were manufactured in Germany and Switzerland to very close tolerances and exacting standards using the highest quality materials of the day, and original pistols were known for having a long service life. The design requires hand fitting of certain parts for proper operation. Assembling the gun using a sideplate from another pistol, for example, may prevent the sear from working, making the pistol inoperable. The Luger barrel, which was rigidly fixed to the barrel extension and carried the front sight, provided excellent accuracy. William B. "Bill" Ruger praised the Luger's 145° (55° for Americans) grip angle and duplicated it in his .22 LR pistol. Handgun author and enthusiast Elmer Keith observed that the Luger design had been unfairly criticized by gun writers over the years as unreliable, partly due to poor experiences with Lugers constructed from salvaged parts. Keith noted that the Luger was a "natural pointer", one of the most accurate of all autoloading pistols—particularly at long ranges—and reminded critics that the Luger was the choice of more nations as their military sidearm than any other contemporary pistol or revolver.

=== Interwar period ===
From 1919 onwards, DWM rebuilt P08 frames with new parts or existing parts (including barrels) into complete pistols for sale to the civilian and export markets. These sales helped restore DWM to solvency after the Armistice. Most of these commercial pistols were in 7.65 Parabellum (.30 Luger) caliber, although a number of pistols were also re-barrelled to 9mm Parabellum (9×19mm). The new component parts were stamped with serial numbers to match the frame to ensure that all the fitted parts stayed together. Many thousands of these pistols were thought to have been assembled and sold between 1919 and 1923. Some of these pistols were fitted with new barrels of different lengths by the importer upon customer request. Many so-called 1919 and 1920 Commercial Lugers were imported to the United States by such firms as Abercrombie & Fitch, Pacific Arms Co., and A.F. Stoeger Inc. The latter importer sought and registered the name Luger in 1929, in the United States.

In 1923, A.F. Stoeger Inc., the predecessor to Stoeger, Inc. began importing commercial pistols from DWM stamped A.F.Stoeger Inc. – New York. and "Germany". These pistols were exported to the United States in both 7.65 Parabellum (.30 Luger) and 9mm calibers, with barrel lengths from 75 mm to 600 mm. These imported Parabellums were also the first pistols to bear the name "Luger", roll stamped on the right side of the receiver. That same year, DWM also signed contracts to supply small numbers of P08 pistols to the armed forces of Finland (8,000 pistols, designated m/23), the Netherlands, and Sweden.

Until 1930, DWM continued to export both P08 and commercial Parabellum pistols to nations in Europe and to overseas markets, including the United States and the Far East. Although never officially adopted by Nationalist forces, all variants of the Parabellum or Luger pistol were highly sought after by both Chinese Nationalist officers and irregular guerrilla forces. In 1924, just before the outbreak of the Chinese Civil War, a review of Chinese Nationalist small arms reported that "Among officers, bodyguards, and police, the German Parabellum (Luger) 9-mm automatic pistol was the weapon of choice...".

In 1930, Mauser took over the manufacture of P.08 from DWM. Additional P08s were produced by Simson and later Krieghoff. Many P04 and P08 pistols would continue in service with German army and navy personnel throughout World War II. Towards the end of 1937 (beginning with 't' & 'u' block pistols), Mauser phased out the rust blue process and "straw finishing" small parts and levers on the P08, choosing to salt blue all parts of the weapon at one time. In 1941, some of these pistols were fitted with inexpensive black Bakelite grip panels to cut production time and expense. Years after the war, these pistols would be given the name "Black Widow" by a postwar US arms dealer as a marketing ploy.

=== World War II ===
The P08 was technically replaced in service in 1938 by the Walther P38, but ever-growing wartime demands for handguns resulted in continued P08 production by Mauser until December 1943. Mauser production was supplemented by a small contract for Luger pistols given to Heinrich Krieghoff & Son of Suhl in 1935 to produce a Luger variant for the Luftwaffe; a second contract for 15,000 pistols was only partially completed when Krieghoff ceased Luger production in 1944. The German Army took their last delivery of 1,000 Mauser-made pistols in November 1943. A further 4,000 pistols assembled by Mauser in December of that same year were sold to Portugal, which renamed them the Model 943. German military authorities refused to take any more Luger pistols, leaving a large stock of parts at the factory in Oberndorf.

Captured Lugers were much prized by Allied soldiers during both of the world wars as war trophies. However, during World War II, German soldiers were known to sometimes use a discarded Luger pistol to lure unsuspecting trophy hunters, rigging it to detonate land mines or hidden booby traps when disturbed. Word also spread of accidental discharges and deaths of Allied troops by users unfamiliar with the P08 and its safety mechanisms, as well as stories circulating that American soldiers were being executed if captured in possession of German weapons.

Soviet forces captured tens of thousands of Lugers, but they were never issued to their troops, only kept in storage.

=== Post-World War II ===
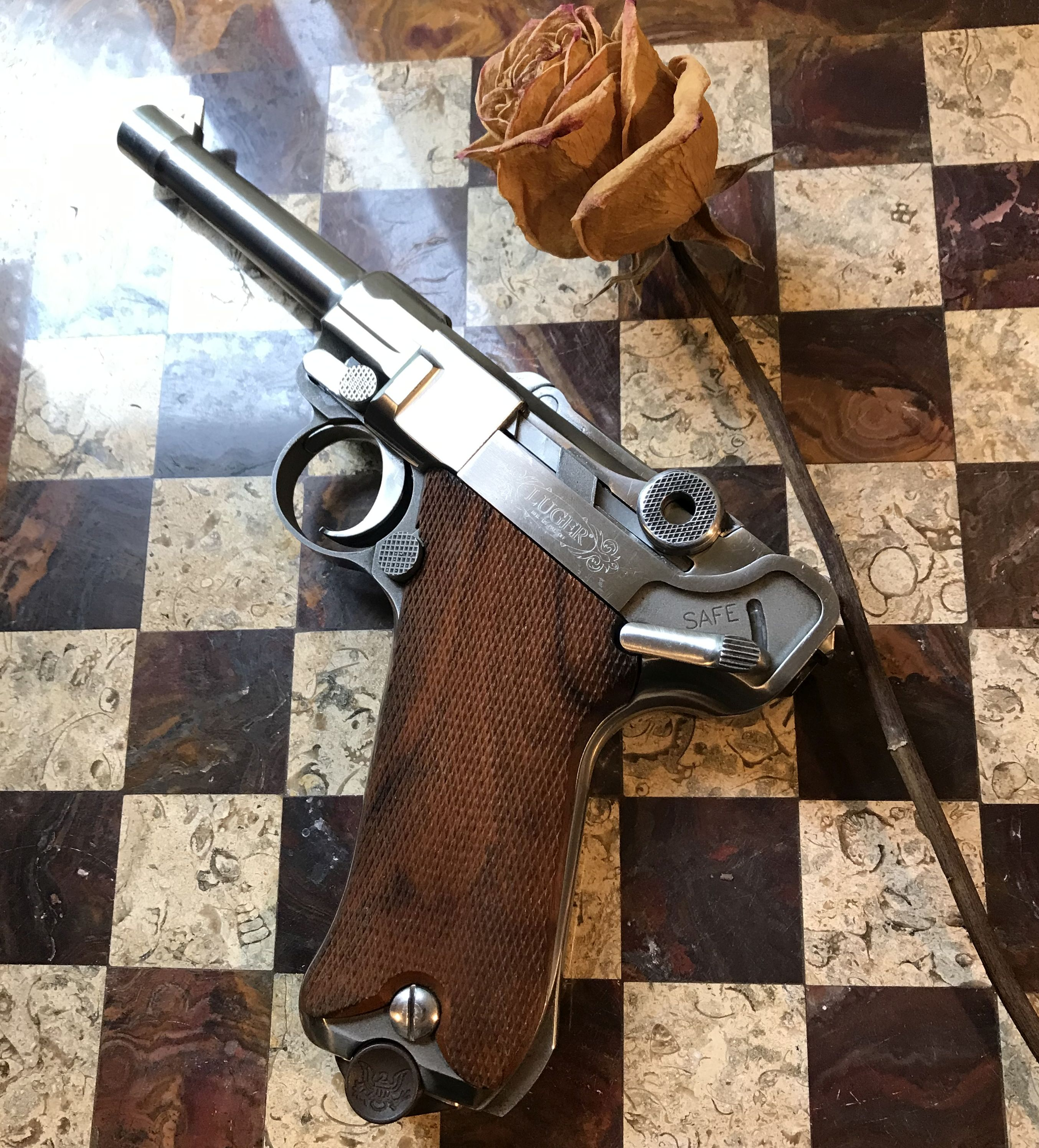
Post-war, stainless steel Luger, 9mm Parabellum.

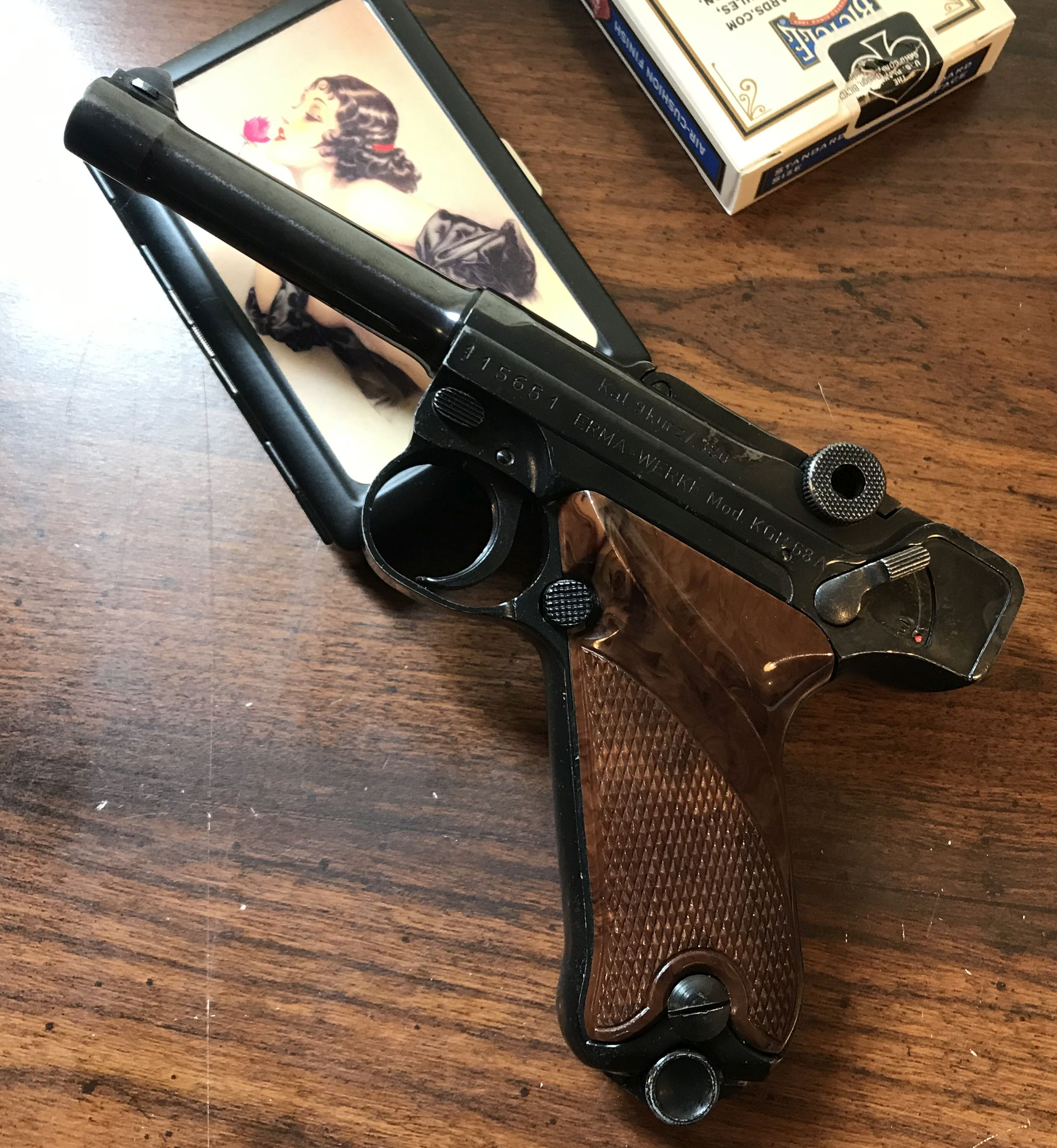
Post-war, Erma manufactured, 9mm Kurz.

Although Mauser P08 production terminated in 1943, the P08 re-appeared in postwar form because of the continuing demand for handguns for military and police requirements. In 1945, Mauser restarted Luger production under the control of the French occupation authority to supply the French military and occupation police forces. Assembly commenced under French control from June 1945 until mid-1946. In the second half of 1946, tooling and some Mauser personnel moved from Oberndorf to Châtellerault in France, the location of MAC (Manufacture d'Armes de Châtellerault) to continue assembly from existing parts stocks. About 4,000 Luger 'parts' pistols, including a few LP 08 models, are thought to have been assembled for French forces, a sufficient number to justify the production of new-manufacture Luger magazines in France for several years. Surviving examples of Lugers assembled under French supervision are sometimes found with a distinct, gray parkerized finish. A few early French control pistols bear a five-pointed star proof mark known to have been used by French Occupation authorities. Later pistols assembled in France often carry a French arsenal/manufacturer name, such as Manufacture Française d'Armes & Cycles de St. Etienne (Manufrance). Surviving French Control Lugers were retained in French storage depots of the paramilitary National Gendarmerie as late as 1970.

Pistols were also assembled under the direction of Soviet (and later, East German) authorities to arm military and MP units, as well as the Volkspolizei. During the immediate postwar period, complete Luger pistols were also assembled from rejected or salvaged parts with different serial numbers, then sold as souvenirs to occupation forces in Germany. Thousands of original Luger pistols were taken home by returning Allied soldiers after both world wars. Other Luger pistols were later assembled in the United States by gunsmiths of varying aptitude using secondhand, rejected, or salvaged parts imported from Germany and other countries. These pistols and their construction quality (or lack of it) would contribute to criticism of the Luger as a finicky and unreliable weapon. However, a well-maintained Luger with new springs and suitable cartridges is a very reliable weapon.

The Swiss Parabellum 06/29 continued in production until 1946. In 1969, after purchasing the Swiss 06/29 tooling, Mauser Werke in Oberndorf restarted Parabellum production, which ceased in 1986 when the last commemorative model was produced. While new Mauser Luger production ended at this time, pistols continued to be assembled and sold from parts on hand until the 1990s.

Aaron Davis, writing in The Standard Catalog of the Luger, claimed that "From its adoption, the Luger was synonymous with the German military through the end of World War II" and "Ask any World War II vet of the [European Theater of Operations] what the most prized war souvenir was and the answer will invariably come back, 'a Luger'." Colonel David Hackworth mentioned in his autobiography that it was still a sought-after sidearm in the Vietnam War. Vietnamese gunsmiths even copied the basic Luger design, producing a few crude "Luger" pistols with which to arm Viet Cong and other irregular forces.

== Variants ==
=== Model 1900 and Swiss Luger ===
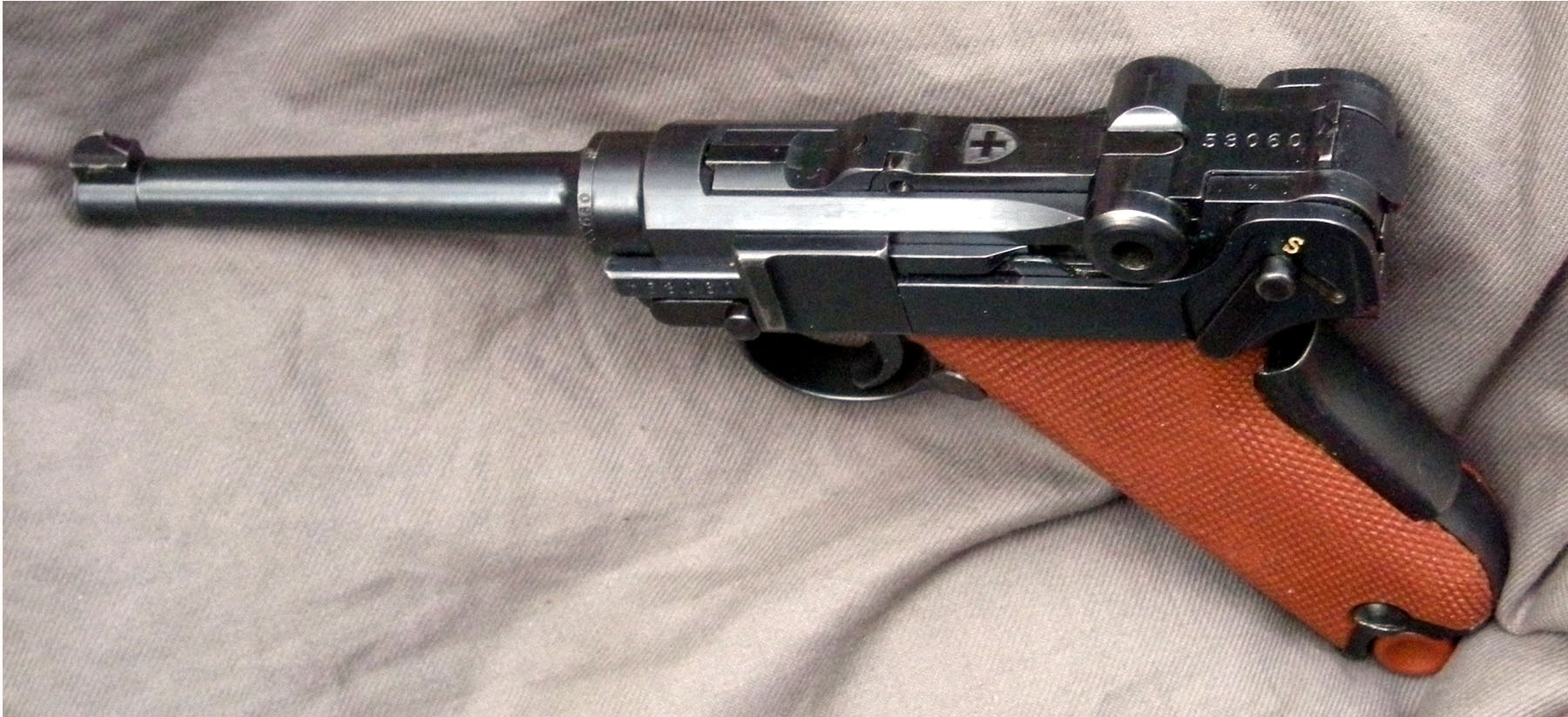
Swiss Pistol 06/29, 7.65×21mm

A number of countries purchased the Model 1900 Parabellum in 7.65×21mm Parabellum (.30 Luger) caliber and issued the pistol on a limited basis to officers, non-commissioned officers and mounted troops, including Germany, Switzerland, and the United States. The Model 1900 or Pistole Modell 1900 was issued to German officers and likely first saw combat in China during intervention by German troops in the aftermath of the Boxer Rebellion of 1900. On April 16, 1901, following a successful preliminary test of the Model 1900 at the Springfield Armory, the U.S. Board of Ordnance purchased 1,000 Model 1900 Parabellum pistols with 4.75-inch barrels, marked with what appear to be standard U.S. ordnance bomb proofs, but are not, and "American Eagle" stamps over the chambers, and issued them to each troop of mounted cavalry of the U.S. Army for field testing, with the remainder to the light artillery and officers at West Point. In 1902, U.S. Army officials purchased another 50 Model 1902 Parabellum pistols with 4-inch barrels, again in 7.65mm Parabellum, for further testing and evaluation. This was followed by a third test of 50 so-called "cartridge counter" Parabellum pistols in 9×19mm by Springfield Armory in 1904. Other nations either tested the Model 1900 or purchased small numbers for limited field service, including Austria, Brazil, Bulgaria, Canada, Chile, the Netherlands, Luxembourg, Russia, Norway, Sweden, and Portugal.

Commercial models of the Model 1900 were exported in quantity as well. In the U.S., Model 1900 pistols in 7.65 Parabellum caliber (aka .30 Luger in the U.S.) were first imported by Georg Luger, then by a DWM sales agent, Hans Tauscher, until World War I. Referred to at the time as the 'Borchardt-Luger' by U.S. authorities, Tauscher consistently referred to the pistol in his marketing and advertising materials as the 'Luger', after its inventor. Model 1900 pistols shipped to the U.S. were typically stamped with an American Eagle atop the barrel extensions. 'American Eagle' 7.65 Model 1900 pistols were used by a variety of buyers, including American lawmen such as Stringer Fenton, outlaws, and Texas Rangers.

=== Swiss Luger ===
After testing, the Swiss Army adopted the Model 1900 on April 4, 1901, in 7.65×21mm caliber as its standard sidearm, designated Pistole 1900. This model uses a 120 mm (4.7 in) barrel and incorporates a grip safety and leaf-type mainspring. A later Swiss military contract with DWM resulted in the latter supplying improved Model 1900/06 pattern pistols designated the Model 1906 or Pistole 1900/06. Commencing in 1918, these Model 1906 Parabellum pistols were manufactured and assembled at Waffenfabrik Bern, Switzerland.

In 1929, Swiss authorities adopted an improved version of the Modell 1900 designated the Modell 06/29 with improved sights, trigger and a stronger toggle link. Manufactured entirely at Waffenfabrik Bern, the 06/29 pistol served the Swiss Army until well after the adoption of the SIG Sauer P210 in 1949, and remained in limited service until the late 1960s.

=== Model 1902 ===
In 1902, DWM introduced a slightly improved version of the Model 1900 Parabellum as the Model 1902. The Model 1902, with its shortened 4-inch barrel, was the first Parabellum pistol to be offered in 9×19mm Parabellum caliber, along with a change from four-groove to six-groove rifling.

=== Navy model ===
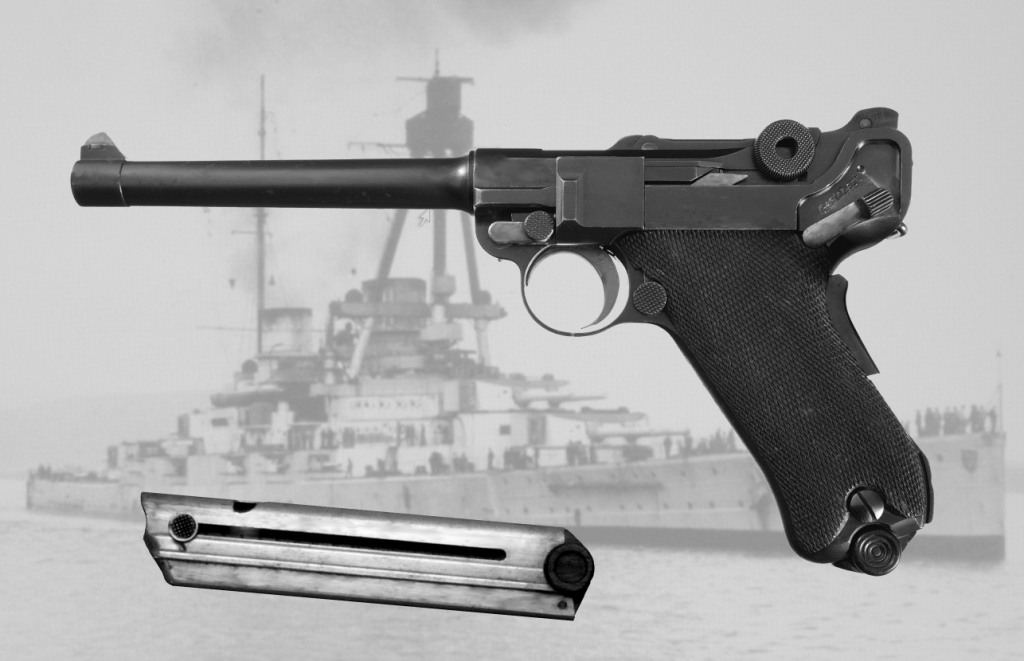
Luger 04 Pistol of the Imperial German Navy

The Luger pistol was accepted by the Imperial German Navy in 1904 in 9mm Parabellum as the Pistole 04 (P04). The navy model had a 150 mm (5.9 in) barrel and a two-position – 100 meters (110 yd) or 200 meters (220 yd) – rear sight. This version was also referred to as the "Marine Modell 1904" or, more colloquially in the US as the "navy Luger". The Pistole 04 was later updated with a coil mainspring to Model 1906 pattern as Luger continued to refine and improve his design.

=== Model 1906 (Neues Modell) ===
Georg Luger introduced a new version of the Parabellum pistol in 1906, which would become known as the Model 1906 or New Model (Neues Modell). This version of the Parabellum replaced the old flat laminated main spring with a more reliable coil design. As all models of the Luger built after 1906 have the coil mainspring, they are known as New Models. Older Parabellum pistols in German service were usually upgraded to the New Model specification.

=== Pistole Modell 1908 (P08) ===
In 1908, the German Army adopted the DWM Parabellum pistol as the Pistole Modell 1908 (P08) Parabellum to replace the Reichsrevolver in front-line service. The Pistole 08 (or P.08) had a 100 mm (3.9 in) barrel and was chambered in 9×19mm Parabellum. This version of Georg Luger's design reflected a number of improvements requested by German military authorities. The grip safety used on earlier versions was omitted, while a lug was attached to the heel of the pistol frame for attachment of a shoulder stock. The barrel was reduced in length to 4 inches (102mm), and the caliber was 9×19mm Parabellum, and the 9×19mm DWM cartridge (Catalog No. 278F) initially adopted by the German Army featured a 123-grain truncated-nose bullet design intended to increase wounding effect of the fully jacketed bullet. With slight modifications, notably the addition of a stock mounting lug and a hold-open latch, the P08 would serve as the German Army's principal sidearm during World War I, augmented by Mauser C96 and Model 1914 pistols. Over 2 million Luger pistols were used by German forces from 1914 to 1918.

The Bolivian Army also adopted the DWM Luger in 9×19mm Parabellum as an officer's sidearm; 500 were bought in 1913. They bore the legend "Ejercito Boliviano" stamped on the chamber.

=== Lange Pistole 08 (Artillery Luger) ===
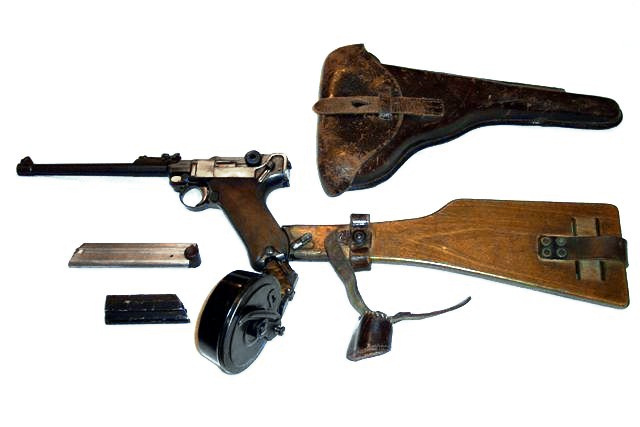
'Artillery Luger' Lange Pistole 08 with a 32-round Trommelmagazin 08 drum magazine and removable stock.

The adoption of the Lange Pistole 08 or LP 08, known as the "Artillery Luger", was authorised by the Kaiser on 2 July 1913. This P08 variation was equipped with a 200 mm (7.9 in) barrel, an 8-position tangent rear sight (calibrated to 800 meters (870 yd)) and a board-type shoulder stock with an attached leather holster. In the event of close combat, the pistol was intended to be used as a carbine with the shoulder stock attached to a lug mounted on the heel of the pistol frame. When set for long range use the rear sight element visibly moves to the left to compensate for spin drift. While initially intended for use by German artillery units who could not be encumbered by the long and heavy K.98 rifle, the LP 08 was also used by Aviation units (prior to equipping aircraft with machine guns) as well as the infantry, primarily on the Western front during World War I. Stoßtruppen (stormtrooper infantry) units frequently employed the Artillery Luger equipped with a new large magazine, the 32-round Trommelmagazin or 'snail' magazine. Production of the LP 08 ended in 1918 with the end of the war. By that time, German troops had begun using the newly developed MP 18 submachine gun in place of the LP 08 for their stormtrooper assault companies. However, by this time enough LP 08 barrels had been manufactured and stockpiled to fill LP 08 export orders into the 1930s.

Carbine versions of the LP 08 were also produced commercially, with yet longer barrels. The firm Armeria Belga of Santiago (Chile) also manufactured a detachable stock, the Benke Thiemann stock, that could fold out from the grip section.

In the early 1920s, carbine production was restarted. Under a small contract, LP 08 or Artillery P08s were assembled in the 1930s to fill an order from the Shah of Iran for his artillery troops, with some of these weapons ending up with Thai police forces. Existing LP 08 pistols that had remained in storage were re-issued in World War II with new-production board stocks for some German units such as artillerymen and Waffen-SS units, and these continued in use until the end of the war in 1945.

=== Luger rifle ===
The Luger rifle was an attempt by Georg Luger to make a full-powered semi-automatic rifle using the same toggle-bolt action of the pistol. A single rifle, serial number 4, exists in a private collection. The Luger rifle was protected under British patent No. 4126 of 1906. It was chambered in 7.92x57mm Mauser.

== Users ==
- Algeria: Used by the National Liberation Army, bought from Yugoslavia or Czechoslovakia
- Australia: Used captured examples in the North African campaign of World War II
- Austria: Armed forces used Lugers after 1945, supplied from the French-controlled Mauser factory
- Bolivia: delivered from 1912 and used during the Chaco War
- Brazil: The 7.65 model 1900 Luger was adopted in 1906 after navy trials, but purchases failed to materialize due to problems in the economy. In 1908 the improved 1906 model in 7.65 was ordered by the army. The Lugers were delivered to Brazil in 1910 and issued primarily to military officers; following a 1919 law a number of those were lent to police forces.
- Canada: 1900 commercial model bought for trials
- Chile: 1900 commercial model bought for trials
- Czechoslovakia:The Luger was in use with the Czechoslovak military after the declaration of independence in 1919
- Kingdom of Bulgaria: Three types of pistols were purchased from DWM.: The 7,65mm obrazetz 1903 (Old Model) was acquired in comparatively small numbers in 1903-4 and featured the distinctively cutaway toggle grips and a 4.75-inch barrel. The 7,65mm Obrazetz 1908 (New Model) was supplied between 1908 and 1909, and had flat-face checkered toggles; around 1,500 were ordered. The 9mm obrazetz 1911, was a 9mm pistol with a 3.9-inch barrel similar to the German Pistole 08 but lacking a grip safety, stock lug and with a lanyard loop on the lower left side of the butt; around 10,000 were ordered. After the Second Balkan War many of the 7,65mm Lugers were re-barreled to 9mm
- China: Used by Chang Tso-lin's warlord army.
- Ethiopian Empire: 1908 export model featuring a Lion of Judah marking over the chamber
- Finland: Small numbers of P08 Lugers acquired by Jägers and the Finnish White Army during the civil war; including 100 artillery lugers. 7.65 pistols with 95mm and 98mm barrels were ordered from DWM and designated m/23 pistol; 2,000 were delivered in 1922 and a further 2,000 in 1923, by 1929 the army had 8,000 m/23 pistols. During the Winter War those pistols were converted to use 9mm ammunition.
- France: The French occupied and operated the Mauser factory 1945–46, then seized remaining Mauser parts stocks to assemble approximately 4,000 Luger pistols for French forces
- Democratic Republic of Georgia: Mainly issued to officers.
- Germany
  - German Empire
  - Weimar Republic
  - Nazi Germany
  - East Germany: Used until the 1960s by the Volkspolizei and Stasi agents. A small number were sold abroad to Ethiopia in the 1980s.
- Grenada
- Indonesia: Almost 14,000 Dutch KNIL M.11 Lugers were in Indonesia before the Japanese occupation of the Dutch East Indies. As such, the Luger was widely used during the Indonesian National Revolution. General Sudirman is known to have personally carried an M.11.
- Italian Social Republic: Supplied to forces collaborating with Germany in northern Italy.
- Imperial State of Iran
- Empire of Japan: Used Luger pistols in a semi-official capacity taken from disarmed Dutch forces in Indonesia.
- Latvia: Purchased less than 1,000 between 1936 and 1939.
- Libya
- Lithuania
- Luxemburg:1900 commercial model bought for trials
- Mexico
- Netherlands: Dutch arms factories made Lugers in 1912 for use by the Dutch East Indies Army. Other contracts were completed for the Dutch Navy commencing in 1923, and the Dutch Air Force in 1928
- New Zealand: Captured P08 Lugers were carried unofficially by some servicemen during WWI and WWII. At the end of WWI many captured Lugers were brought to New Zealand and were surrendered under amnesty following the 1920 Arms Act which outlawed the civilian possession of 'semi‐automatic pistols'. In 1942 the surrendered P08s held in Government stores were issued to RNZAF officers in the Aerodrome Defence Squadrons.
- Norway: In use from 1945 and phased out in 1987.
- Palestine: the Palestine Liberation Organization received P08s from East Germany
- Portugal: Around 1901, a commission tested various semiautomatic pistols, the 7.65 model 1900 Luger was considered superior. No immediate decision was taken and in 1907 another commission decided on the Luger. That same year 50 Model 1906 commercial pistols were bought for an expedition into Cuamato territory in Angola. In 1908, between 3.500 to 5.000 model 1906 pistols in 7.65 were delivered. In 1910 the navy bought 650 Lugers in 9mm. In 1935 564 Lugers in 7.65 were bought for the National Republican Guard. In 1942 4.500 P08 Lugers were purchased
- Romania
- Russian Empire: 9mm Lugers were authorized as a sidearm in 1907; small amounts were privately purchased by officers.
- Spain
- Soviet Union: Used by the Red Army during the civil war; in September 1929, an agreement was signed under which about 300 pistols were delivered from the Weimar Republic, their assembly was carried out at the Sestroretsk arms factory. stored captured P08s but never used in combat
- Sweden
- Switzerland: The Swiss Army was the first to adopt the Luger. 1900–1950
- Turkey
- Thailand
- United Kingdom: used by Special Operations Executive
- United States: The U.S. Ordnance Board purchased 1,000 Model 1900 7.65mm pistols under an official military contract order in 1901 and issued them to active duty cavalry troops for field testing. Most were distributed to U.S. Cavalry troops involved in police actions in the Philippines and Cuba. As the American Cavalry troops had used .45 and .38 revolvers for over 30 years, the small caliber, complex Luger, was viewed with some suspicion and not readily accepted. There were complaints as to small caliber, safety while riding from horseback, and unreliable action. As a result of these reports 50 Lugers in caliber 9mm were briefly tested by the Army in 1904-1906 and three Lugers in .45 caliber were tested in 1907. The Luger was rejected by the U.S. Army in favor of the Colt M1911. In 1905-1907 the Springfield Armory called in most of the M1900 Test Lugers.
- Venezuela: 1908 export model, it can be identified by a five-pointed star on the chamber

=== Non-state entities ===
- Ação Libertadora Nacional
- Lebanese Forces
- Organisation armée secrète
- Provisional Irish Republican Army
- Puerto Rican Nationalist Party
- Viet Cong
- Yugoslav Partisans
- Zimbabwe African National Liberation Army
- (United States) Zodiac Killer

== See also ==
- Lahti L-35
- Nambu pistol
- Stoeger Luger
- Table of handgun and rifle cartridges
