= Pietro Gussalli Beretta =

Italian entrepreneur

- Born: 28 February 1962 (age 64); Brescia, Italy
- Occupation: Entrepreneur
- Title: President and CEO of Beretta Holding, Beretta Industrie; Executive Vice President of Fabbrica D'Armi Pietro Beretta, Benelli_Armi, Beretta U.S.A. Corp; President of Benelli U.S.A. Corp, Humbert CTTS, Beretta-Benelli Ibérica, Fondazione Beretta
- Children: 1
- Father: Ugo Gussalli Beretta

Pietro Gussalli Beretta (born 28 February 1962) is an Italian entrepreneur, president, and CEO of several companies, notably within Beretta Holding.

== Early life ==
Pietro Gussalli Beretta was born in Brescia, Italy, on 28 February 1962.

Pietro Gussalli Beretta earned a degree in economics and business administration.

== Career ==
In 1995, Pietro Gussalli Beretta restructured the Beretta Holding group, which he manages with his father Ugo Gussalli Beretta and his brother Franco Gussalli Beretta. Pietro Gussalli Beretta initiated a business development strategy aimed at expanding the international presence of Beretta Holding and its product range, through acquisitions funded by cash.

Pietro Gussalli Beretta has been involved in other companies such as UBI Banca, Lucchini RS, and Sanlorenzo, specializing in the production of luxury yachts, from which he resigned in 2023 due to his commitments in other international companies.

He is also the president of the Beretta Foundation. Established in 1981 by Dr. Pier Giuseppe Beretta, it is a non-profit organization that promotes cancer research and therapy.

== Personal life ==
Pietro Gussalli Beretta has a daughter, Maria Teresa. He engages in hunting and collects modern and oriental art.

== See also ==
- Beretta
- Benelli
