= Nambu pistol =

Type 14 Nambu
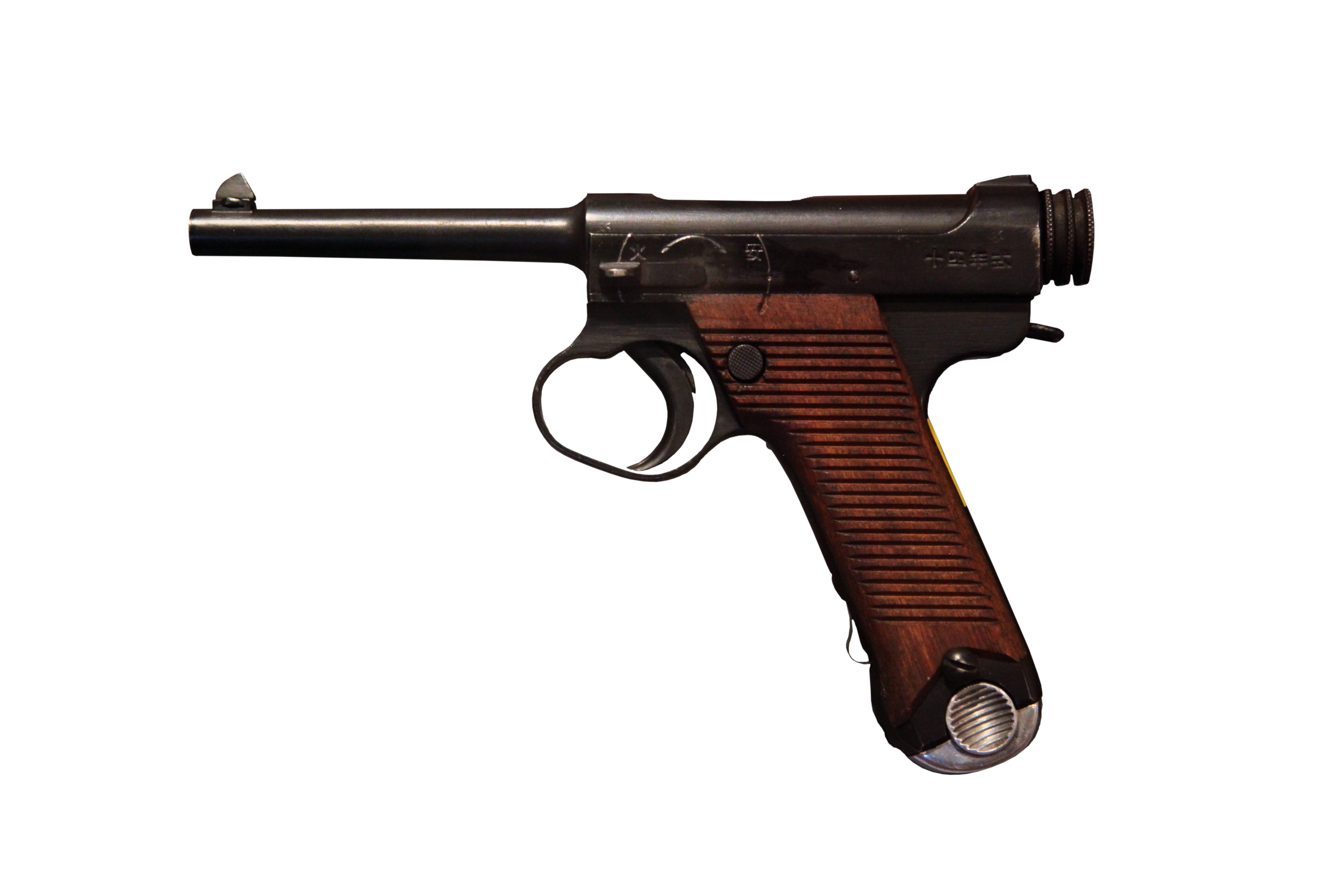
- Nambu Pistol Model 14
- Type: Semi-automatic pistol
- Place of origin: Empire of Japan

Service history
- In service: 1904–1945
- Used by: See users
- Wars: Russo-Japanese War; World War I Pacific War; Second Sino-Japanese War; Indonesian National Revolution; Chinese Civil War; Hukbalahap Rebellion; Korean War; First Indochina War; Vietnam War (limited)

Production history
- Designer: Kijiro Nambu
- Designed: 1902
- Produced: 1906–1945
- No. built: 10,300 (Type A, all variants) approx. 400,000 (Type 14)
- Variants: Type A, Type B, Type 14

Specifications
- Mass: 900 g (1.98 lb) unloaded
- Length: 230 mm (9.06 in)
- Barrel length: 117 mm (4.61 inches)
- Cartridge: 8×22mm Nambu
- Action: Recoil-spring
- Muzzle velocity: 290 metres per second (950 ft/s)
- Effective firing range: 50 metres (55 yd)
- Feed system: 8-round box magazine

The Nambu pistols (南部拳銃 or 南部大型自動拳銃, Nanbu kenjū/Nanbu ōgata jidou-kenjuu) are a Japanese series of semi-automatic pistols produced by the Koishikawa Arsenal, later known as the Tokyo Artillery Arsenal. The series has three variants, the Type A, the Type B (also known as the Baby Nambu), and the Type 14 (十四年式拳銃, Jūyon nen shiki kenjū). The Nambu pistols were designed to replace Japan's earlier service pistol, the Type 26 revolver.

The pistols were designed by Kijirō Nambu and saw extensive service in the Empire of Japan during the Second Sino-Japanese War and the Pacific War. The most common variant, the Type 14, was used mostly by officers, who had to pay for their pistols themselves.

== History ==
Prior to the design of the Nambu, the only pistol in Japanese service was the Type 26 revolver, which served with distinction during the First Sino-Japanese War (1894–1895). However, in the 1890s, semi-automatic pistol designs began to emerge. Among them was the Mauser C96, which was influential in the production of the Nambu, as it uses the same locking mechanism as the C96. The Nambu was designed shortly after a Japanese commission reported on European military developments.

The first Nambu, the Type A, was completed in 1902. This version was never adopted, but some were sold to China and Siam. The Type B was adopted by the Imperial Japanese Navy and Royal Thai Army during the 1920s and the later Type 14 was adopted in 1926 (Taishō 14) as the service pistol of the Imperial Japanese Army until its surrender in 1945. Nambu pistols were symbols of prestige, often carried in fanciful holsters, and were used more as a means of ornament and status rather than for fighting. Japan produced about 400,000 Nambu pistols over the course of the war and the United States made over a million M1911 pistols.

Alongside other Japanese weapons, such as guntōs and Arisaka rifles, many American servicemen took Nambu pistols home with them as war trophies. Production of Nambu pistols ceased after the end of the war and Nambu pistols were replaced by M1911A1s provided by the US to the Japan Self-Defense Forces and police. According to Walter, up to 1,000 Type 14s remained in use with the Coast Guard until the production of 8 mm Nambu ammunition ceased in the 1960s. These pistols were then replaced with Japanese-made revolvers.

== Design ==
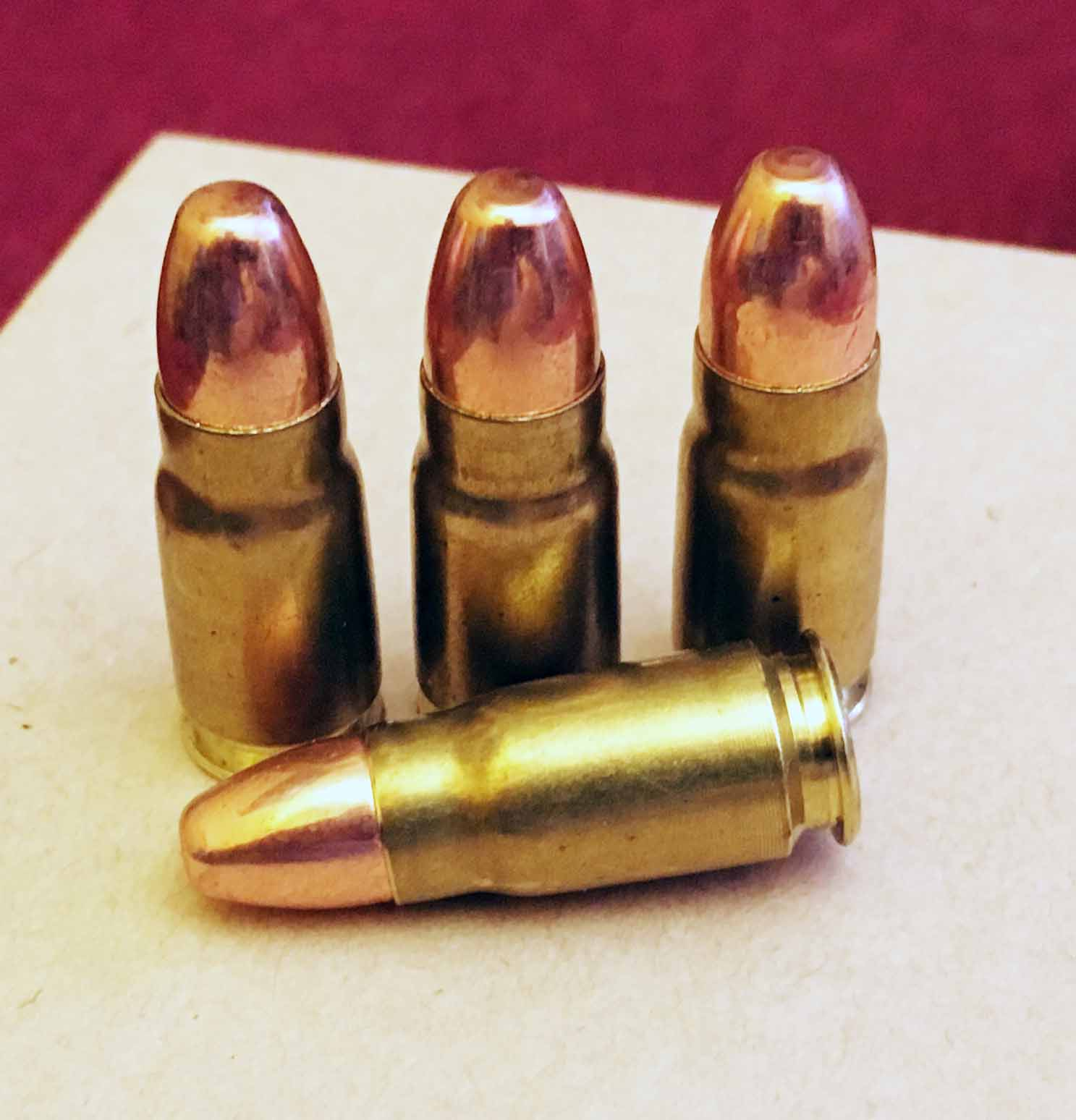
8×22mm Nambu ammunition

The Nambu pistol is a recoil operated, locked breech, semi-automatic pistol. The Type A and 14 Nambus have magazine capacities of eight rounds, whereas the Type B has seven. A common flaw in the series was that the gun's safety catch and its magazine release did not enable the magazine to slide out of the gun once it was empty, forcing the operator to work against the weight of the recoil spring and leaf spring, making reloading difficult. The magazine catch was removed from the Type 14. Another issue with the safety was that it is located just above the trigger guard, meaning that it can not be activated with the same hand that is holding the pistol.

The grip on the Nambu is slanted, which makes feeding the magazine a delicate procedure. The magazine spring is only about 60% effective, and the bullets moving against the walls of the magazine cause frictional loss, weakening the spring further. Furthermore, the size of the bullets has to be exact; soft point and cast lead bullets fail to chamber properly.

The Nambu pistol uses the 8×22mm Nambu cartridge, which made it substantially weaker than other handguns. The 8 mm round's muzzle energy is less than half that of the 9×19mm Parabellum (used in the Walther P38), and the 7.62×25mm Tokarev (used in the TT-33).

=== Type A ===
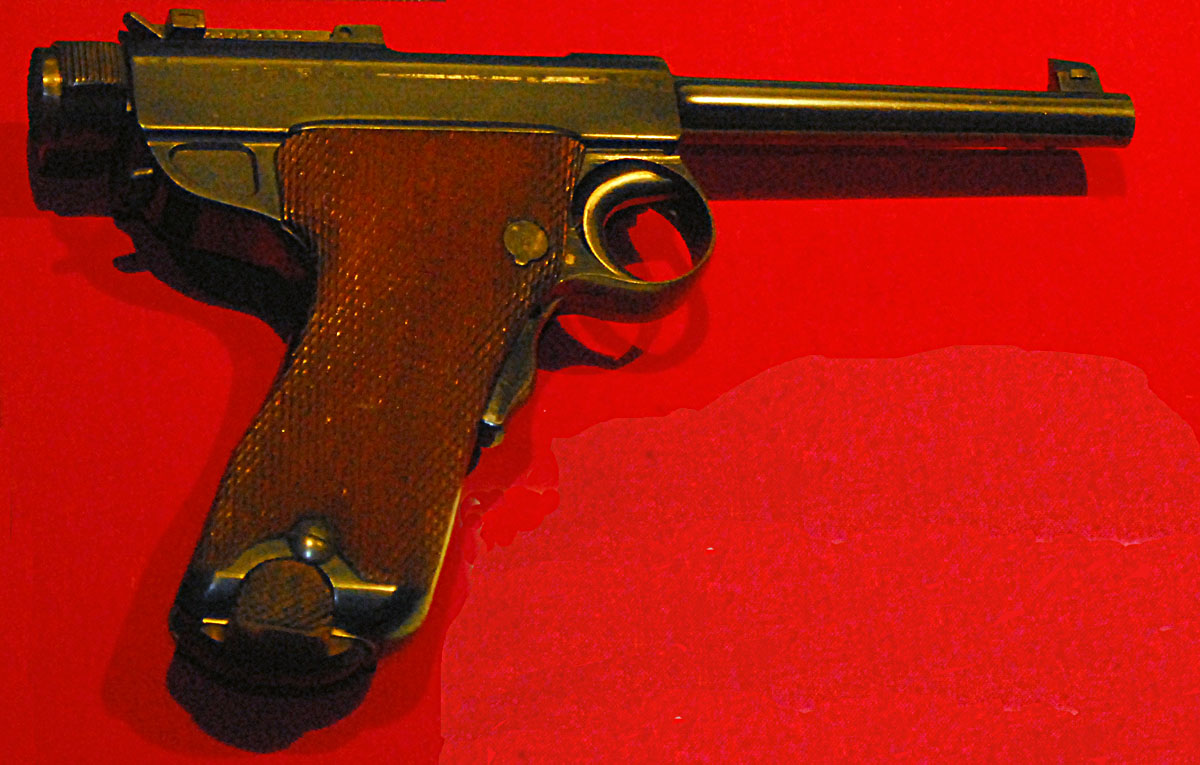
Original "Grandpa" Type A

The first type of Nambu that was produced was the Type A. Type A Nambus produced from 1903-1906 have differences from those produced after 1906, and, among collectors, the original Nambus are commonly referred to as "Grandpa" Nambus. The "Grandpa" Type A was produced until around serial number 2,400. Production of the Type A Nambu ceased as of 1923, as the Type 14 was both cheaper and more effective. The Nambu Type A somewhat resembles the Luger pistol in appearance, but this is superficial. The Type A had a provision that allowed for the installation of a stock, as seen on the Mauser C96. The stocks could be used as holsters as they were designed to fit a Type A inside of them. These were hand fitted, so interchangeability is limited. The stocks were serialized to the pistol.

A later version of the Type A Nambu, the Type A modified, also known as the "Papa" Nambu, was produced until around serial number 7,000. The trigger guard of the "Grandpa" Nambu was enlarged in later models. Some "Papa" Nambu had stock attachment slots, with four known.

=== Type B ===
Type B Nambu
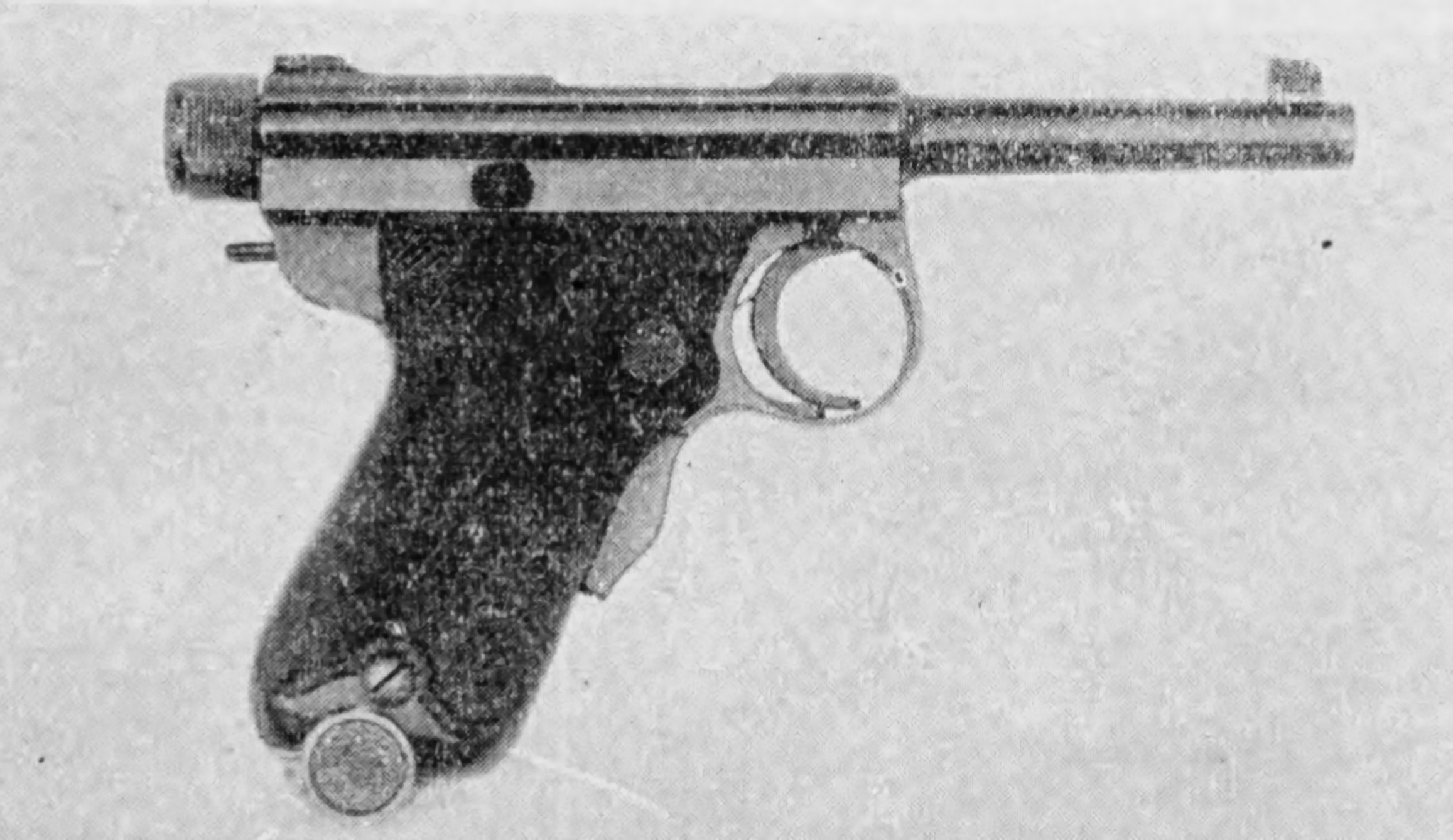
- 7mm Baby Nambu
- Type: Semi-automatic pistol
- Place of origin: Empire of Japan

Service history
- Used by: Imperial Japanese Army
- Wars: Second Sino-Japanese War, World War II

Production history
- Designer: Kijiro Nambu
- Designed: 1909
- Manufacturer: Koishikawa Arsenal
- Produced: 1909 to c1929
- No. built: around 6,000

Specifications
- Mass: 650 g (23 oz) Unloaded
- Length: 171 mm (6.75 in)
- Barrel length: 83 mm (3.25 in)
- Cartridge: 7×20mm Nambu
- Action: Short recoil, locked breech
- Muzzle velocity: 290 m/s (950 ft/s)
- Feed system: 7-round detachable box magazine
- Sights: Open notch rear

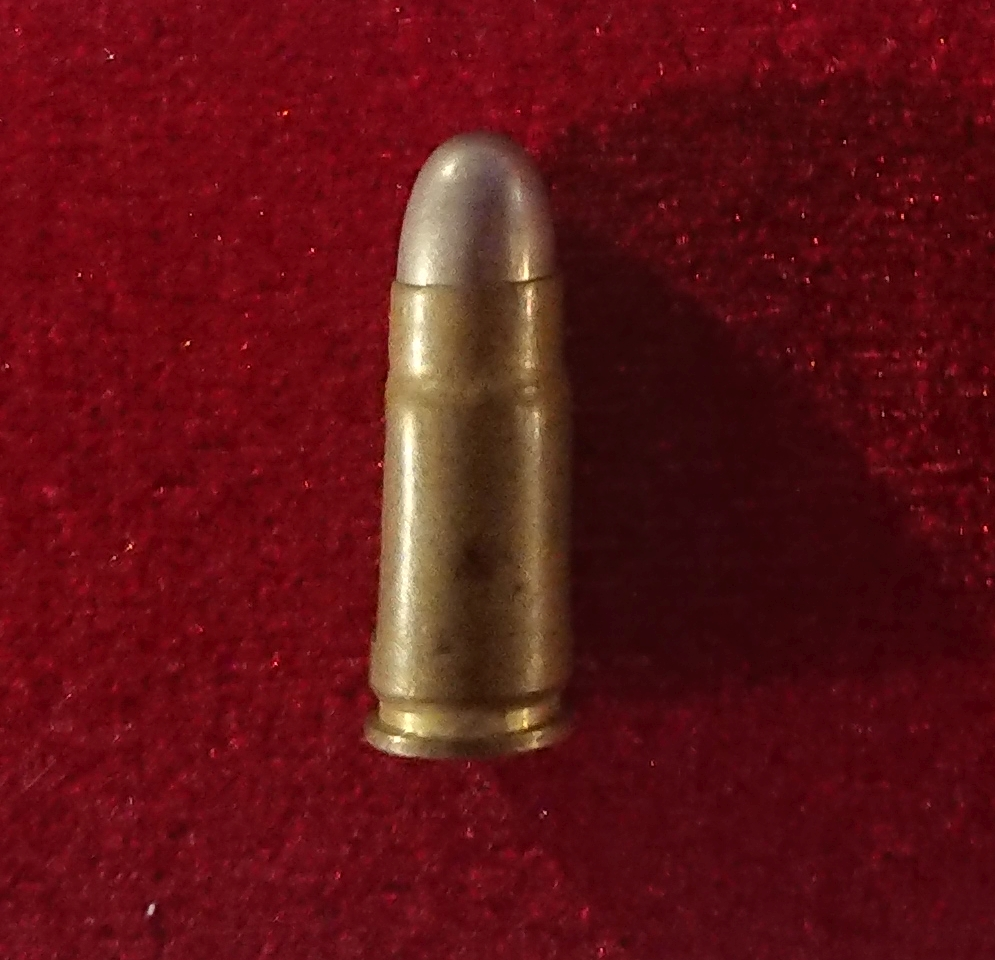
7×20mm Baby Nambu round

Due to failings with the Type A Nambu, an improvement, the Type B, was devised. Both the pistol itself, and the round it fired, are smaller than the other Nambu pistols, leading to the name "Baby" Nambu. Type B Nambus were produced at the Tokyo Artillery Arsenal. The first 450 models have the bottom part of the magazine made of wood, and only one diameter firing pin, but later Type Bs have the magazine made from aluminium, and incorporate a multiple diameter firing pin. The Type B Nambu was never adopted officially by any Japanese armed forces. As was customary in the Imperial Japanese Army, officers paid for pistols with their own salaries, but the Type B Nambu was unable to achieve market success as it was twice the price of a comparable imported pistol, such as the FN M1900. A Type B Nambu sold for 180 yen, making it cost roughly the same as a captain's entire monthly salary. After the 1923 Great Kantō earthquake, Koishikawa Arsenal stopped producing new parts for Type B Nambus, but continued to assemble ones with existing parts until 1929.

=== Type 14 ===
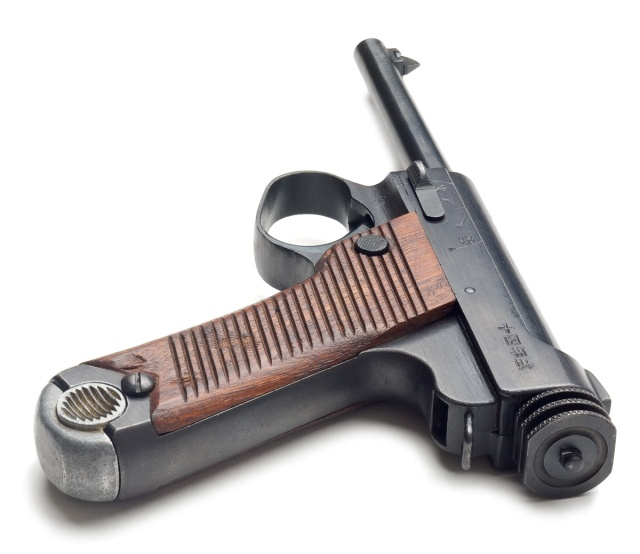
Type 14

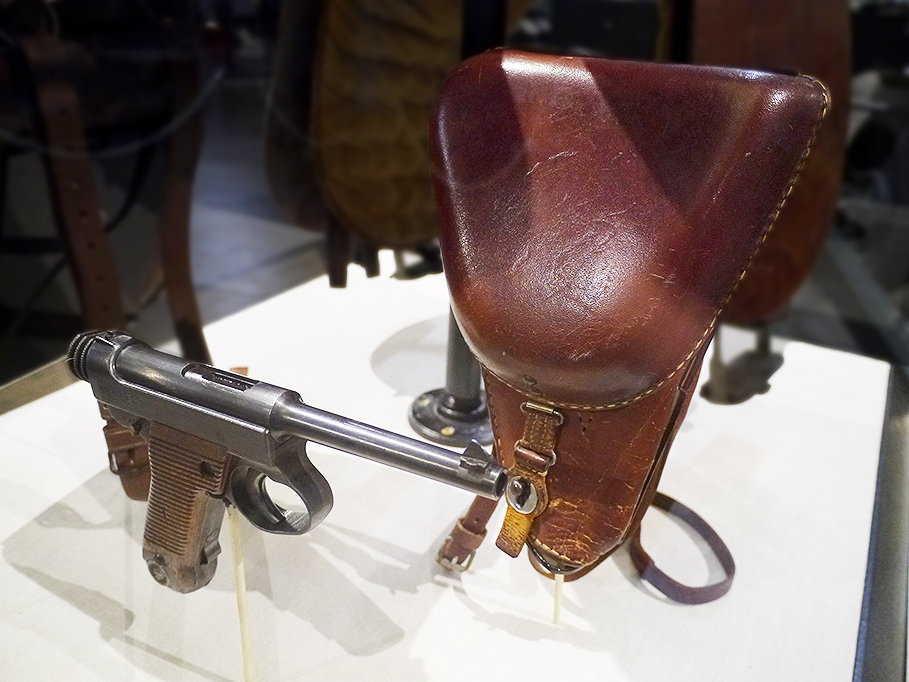
Nambu Type 14, Series 1, original pistol and holster, exhibited in the Texas Military Forces Museum

The Type 14 Nambu gets its name from the year it was produced - the 14th year of the Taishō era, or 1926. It was designed to help lower the manufacturing cost of the Nambus, and like the Type A, fires the 8×22mm Nambu. From 1927, it was a standard issue sidearm for officers and was being sold for 78 yen by 1939. It is believed that around 400,000 Type 14 Nambus were produced, but the exact number is unknown, as Japanese soldiers considered their weapons property of the emperor, and many chose to destroy their pistols or throw them into the ocean to avoid them falling into enemy hands.

Later production models have a larger trigger guard, following complaints by soldiers stationed in Manchukuo that it was difficult to fire the trigger while wearing gloves. Some of these models also have a knurled steel cocking knob instead of the standard "slotted" cocking knob. After 1940, an auxiliary magazine spring was added to assist in reloading. A redesigned cocking knob was implemented in 1944 to simplify production. The Type 14 also lacks the grip safety used on the previous models.

Pre-1937 Type 14s are well made, with a noticeable decline in quality after the war's beginning, to meet wartime production demands. However, later Type 14s remained mostly functional despite the decreased quality. The holsters for the pistols also had to be changed to accommodate wartime. A lack of available raw materials resulted in a move from holsters made of leather to rubberized canvas.

== Users ==
- Empire of Japan
  - Japan: Formerly used by the Japan Coast Guard when it was created as the Maritime Safety Agency; the Nambu was dropped when ammunition production ceased in the 1960s.
- Indonesia
- North Korea
- Philippines
- Republic of China: Used by warlord Zhang Zuolin's army and the National Revolutionary Army.
- Thailand
- Vietnam: Used by Viet Minh soldiers in the First Indochina War and later used by the Viet Cong during the Vietnam War. Most retrofitted to fire 7.62×25mm Tokarev ammo by using barrels taken from 7.65×21mm Parabellum Lugers.

== Legacy ==
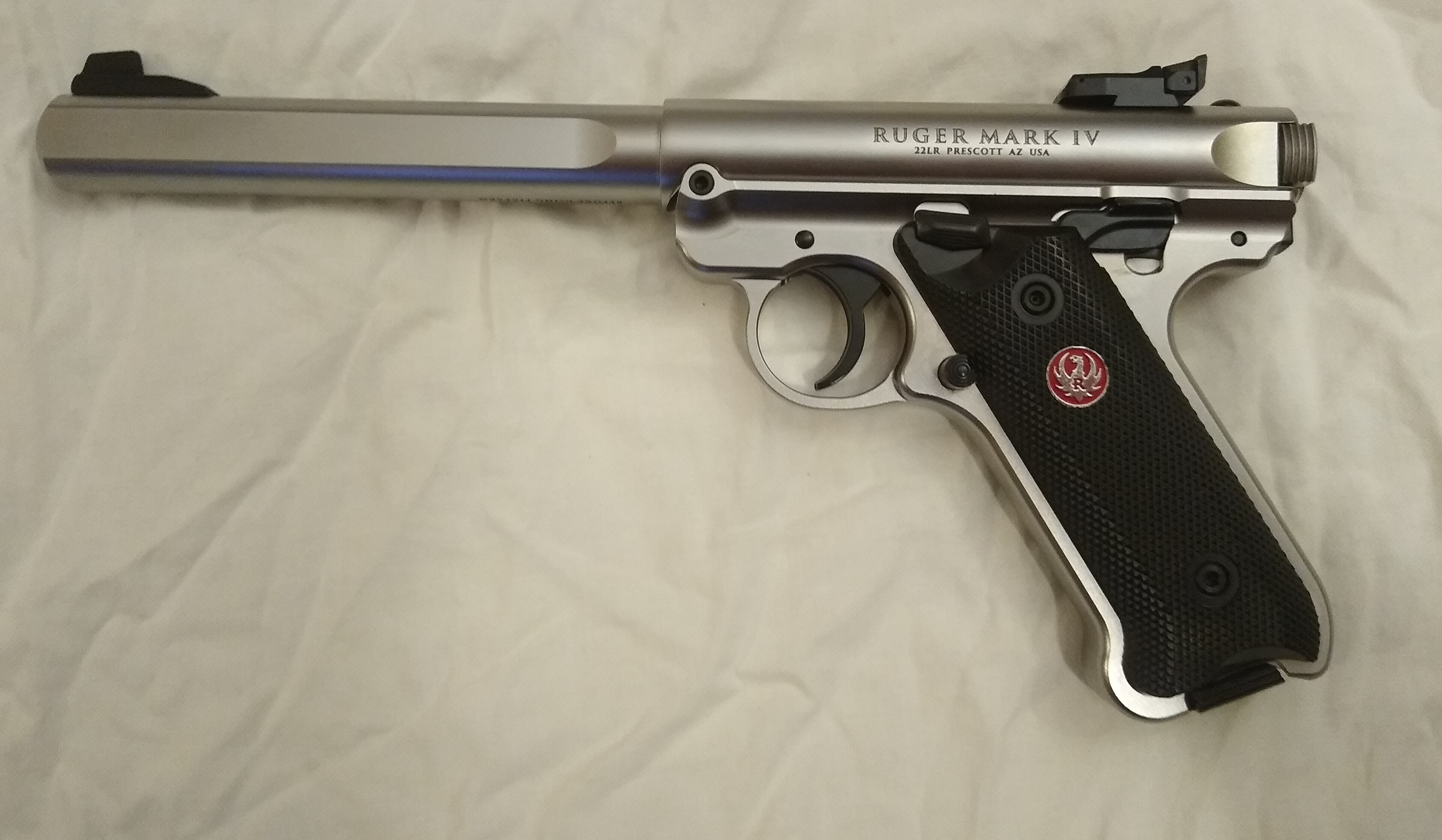
A Mark IV model of the Ruger Standard pistol

In 1949, William B. Ruger took design elements of the Nambu in his own design, which became the Ruger Standard. This was the first weapon designed by Sturm, Ruger & Co. The Ruger Standard would become the most successful .22LR pistol ever produced, and as of 2016, Ruger's company produced more firearms than any other American company, and was worth over $600 million.

Because of their rarity and historical significance, Nambu pistols became sought after by gun collectors, with models selling anywhere from $800 to $1,500.
