= Stoeger Industries =

American manufacturer of firearms

- Company type: Private
- Industry: Firearms
- Founded: 1924
- Headquarters: Accokeek, Maryland, United States
- Parent: Benelli
- Subsidiaries: Stoeger Publishing
- Website: stoegerindustries.com

Stoeger Industries is a manufacturer and importer of firearms into the United States.

The company's Stoeger Publishing division also publishes books and videos about firearms, hunting and fishing.

Stoeger Industries' headquarters are in Accokeek, Maryland, United States. Stoeger is a wholly owned subsidiary of Benelli USA, which in turn is owned by Italian firearms conglomerate Beretta Holding S.A. Besides marketing a line of tactical and hunting shotguns as well as air rifles, Stoeger also serves as a Federal Firearms Licensee for importing firearms by Uberti, a company owned by Beretta Holding.

Because of the significant corporate interrelationships, the actual country of manufacturing origin of Stoeger firearms varies based on both the specific model and the year of its manufacture. Current Stoeger firearms have their manufacturing origins in countries such as Brazil, Italy, Turkey, and the United States.

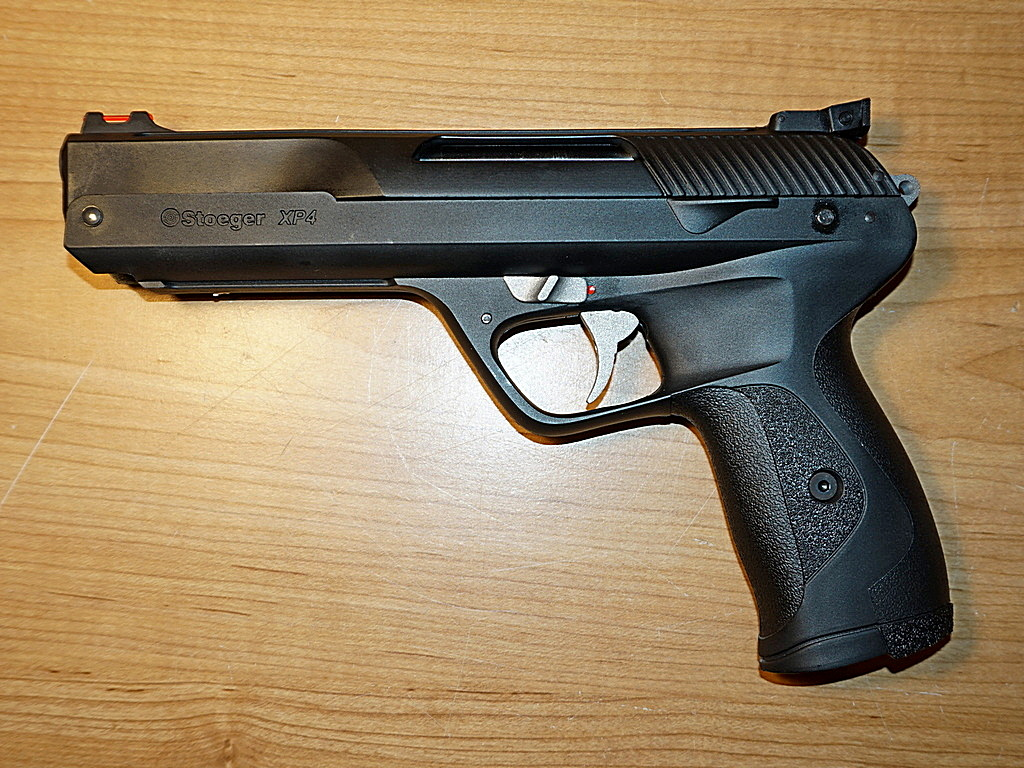
Stoeger XP4 air pistol .177 pellet caliber

== History ==
Prior to its acquisition by Beretta in 2000, Stoeger was located in New Jersey, and prior to that was the largest gun store in New York City.

Stoeger commissioned various small companies in Germany to manufacture a .22 Long Rifle replica of the Luger, which it imported. It later sold an American-made version of the Luger in 1994. The pistol was all stainless steel and was in 9 mm and sold as the American Eagle Luger with 4" and 6" barrels. Stoeger has owned the name "Luger" in the United States market since around 1924.

Some shares of Vursan Silah Sanayi A.Ş., which was established in Turkey in 1989, were purchased by Beretta in 2000, forming a Turkish-Italian partnership. Later, in 2002, all shares were purchased by Beretta and it became a fully Italian company.

Stoeger also distributed in the United States some firearms made by Fabrique Nationale (FN).

== Firearms / Airguns ==
Firearms and airguns sold by Stoeger Industries include the following:

- .22 Luger
- Stoeger STR-9 - 9mm Pistol
- Stoeger STR-40 - .40 S&W Pistol
- Stoeger STR-45 - .45 ACP Pistol
- Stoeger XP4 Single shot pre-compressed air pistol (360 m/s muzzle velocity 0.177 pellets)
- X5 Spring piston entry level air rifle (200 m/s muzzle velocity 0.22 pellets / 245 m/s 0.177 pellets)
- X10 Spring piston air rifle (305 m/s muzzle velocity 0.22 pellets / 365 m/s 0.177 pellets)
- X20 Spring piston air rifle (305 m/s muzzle velocity 0.22 pellets / 365 m/s 0.177 pellets)
- X50 Spring piston air rifle (360 m/s muzzle velocity 0.22 pellets / 460 m/s 0.177 pellets)
- Cougar semi-automatic pistol.
- Condor over-and-under shotgun.
- STF 3000 over-and-under shotgun.
- The Grand - single shot trap shotgun
- Uplander side-by-side shotgun.
- Coach Gun side-by-side shotgun.
- P-350 pump shotgun.
- Model 2000 semi-automatic shotgun
- Model 3000 (3") semi-automatic shotgun
- Model 3020 series (2.5”/3”) of 20 gauge semi-automatic shotguns
- Model 3500 (3.5") semi-automatic shotgun
- Stoeger Double Defense double-barreled shotgun designed as a tactical defense gun. Black matte finish with single trigger. Has a Picatinny rail on the barrels to attach accessories.
