= Tales of the Gun =

1998 History Channel television series

Tales of the Gun is a television series that was broadcast on the History Channel for one season in 1998. It featured the history of firearms.

The usual episode format included interviews of historians and people who used the featured weapon, explanations of how the weapons were made, and demonstrations on a shooting range. The series narrator for the American version was Thom Pinto, a veteran voice actor.

== Episodes ==
=== Season 1 ===
1. Ep 1: "Making of a Gun"
2. Ep 2: "Bullets and Ammo"
3. Ep 3: "Duelling pistols"
4. Ep 4: "The Gunslingers"
5. Ep 5: "Guns of Colt"
6. Ep 6: "Guns of Remington"
7. Ep 7: "Guns of Smith & Wesson"
8. Ep 8: "Guns of Winchester"
9. Ep 9: "Early Guns"
10. Ep 10: "The Rifle"
11. Ep 11: "Shotguns"
12. Ep 12: "The Guns of Browning"
13. Ep 13: "Early Machine Guns"
14. Ep 14: "Gangster Guns"
15. Ep 15: "The Tommy Gun"
16. Ep 16: "Rapid Firepower"
17. Ep 17: "Guns of the Civil War"
18. Ep 18: "Guns of the Revolution"
19. Ep 19: "US Guns of WW2"
20. Ep 20: "Infamous Guns"
21. Ep 21: "German Small Arms of WW2"
22. Ep 22: "Luger"
23. Ep 23: "Guns of the Mauser"
24. Ep 24: "Guns of Israel"
25. Ep 25: "Guns of the Russian Military"
26. Ep 26: "Japanese Guns of WW2"
27. Ep 27: "Naval Guns"
28. Ep 28: "M-16"
29. Ep 29: "AK-47"
30. Ep 30: "Super Guns of Today and Tomorrow"
31. Ep 31: "Guns of the Sky"
32. Ep 32: "Automatic Pistols"
33. Ep 33: "Sharpshooters and Long Range Guns"
34. Ep 34: "Police Guns"
35. Ep 35: "Women and Guns"
36. Ep 36: "Guns of Infamy Part 1"
37. Ep 37: "Guns of Infamy Part 2"
38. Ep 38: "Million Dollar Guns"
39. Ep 39: "Guns of the Commandos"
40. Finale: "Ten Guns That Changed the World"
41. Unknown: "Guns of the Orient"
42. Unknown: "Guns of Valor"
43. Unknown: "Guns of the US Mounted Cavalry"
44. Unknown: "Rockets and Missiles"
45. Unknown: "Big Guns"
46. Unknown: "European Revolvers"
47. Unknown: "Guns of the British Military"
48. Unknown: "Guns of the Bizarre"
49. Unknown: "Guns of the Famous"
50. Unknown: "Magnificent Failures"
51. Unknown: "Guns of Afghanistan"
52. Unknown: "Guns of Beretta"
