= 2021 Campeonato Gaúcho =

Campeonato Gaúcho
- Season: 2021
- Dates: 27 February – 23 May 2021
- Teams: 12
- Champions: Grêmio (40th title)
- Relegated: Esportivo; Pelotas
- Brasileiro Série D: Caxias; Aimoré
- Matches: 72
- Top goalscorer: Diego Souza (7 goals)
- Best goalkeeper: Brenno (6 clean sheets)
- Biggest home win: Internacional 5–0 Esportivo
- Biggest away win: Aimoré 1–6 Internacional
- Total attendance: 0 (Note: All matches will be played behind closed doors.)

The 2021 Campeonato da Primeira Divisão de Futebol Profissional da FGF - Divisão Especial - Série A1, better known as the 2021 Campeonato Gaúcho (officially the Gauchão Ipiranga 2021 for sponsorship reasons), was the 101st season of Rio Grande do Sul's top flight football league. The competition was played from 27 February to 23 May 2021. 12 clubs contested in the Campeonato Gaúcho. Grêmio were the three-time defending champion and successfully defended their title.

== Teams ==
A total of 12 teams competed in the 2021 Série A1 season.

Club	City	Stadium	Capacity	Pos. in 2020	1st season	Titles	Last title	First title
Aimoré	São Leopoldo	Cristo Rei	12,000	7th	1919	1	1919	1919
Brasil (PE)	Pelotas	Bento Freitas	18,000	9th	1919	1	1919	1919
Caxias	Caxias do Sul	Centenário	22,132	2nd	1961	1	2000	2000
Esportivo	Bento Gonçalves	Montanha dos Vinhedos	15,269	4th	1970	—	—	—
Grêmio	Porto Alegre	Arena do Grêmio	55,225	1st	1919	39	2020	1921
Internacional	Porto Alegre	Beira-Rio	50,128	3rd	1927	45	2016	1927
Juventude	Caxias do Sul	Alfredo Jaconi	23,726	8th	1925	1	1998	1998
Novo Hamburgo	Novo Hamburgo	Estádio do Vale	6,500	10th	1930	1	2017	2017
Pelotas	Pelotas	Boca do Lobo	18,000	12th	1930	1	1930	1930
São José-RS	Porto Alegre	Francisco Novelletto Neto	8,000	6th	1961	—	—	—
São Luiz	Ijuí	19 de Outubro	14,000	11th	1974	—	—	—
Ypiranga-RS	Erechim	Colosso da Lagoa	30,000	5th	1968	—	—	—

== First stage ==
=== Table ===
Pos	Team	Pld	W	D	L	GF	GA	GD	Pts	Qualification or relegation
1	Grêmio	11	7	3	1	23	9	+14	24	Qualification to Knockout stage
2	Internacional	11	7	2	2	24	9	+15	23	Qualification to Knockout stage
3	Juventude	11	5	2	4	14	12	+2	17	Qualification to Knockout stage
4	Caxias	11	4	5	2	13	11	+2	17	Qualification to Knockout stage
5	Ypiranga-RS	11	4	4	3	20	15	+5	16	
6	São José-RS	11	4	3	4	10	11	−1	15	
7	Aimoré	11	4	2	5	10	14	−4	14	
8	São Luiz	11	3	4	4	10	15	−5	13	
9	Brasil (PE)	11	3	3	5	8	12	−4	12	
10	Novo Hamburgo	11	2	3	6	13	20	−7	9	
11	Esportivo	11	2	3	6	9	18	−9	9	Relegation to Série A2
12	Pelotas	11	1	6	4	10	18	−8	9	Relegation to Série A2

Updated to match(es) played on 25 April 2021. Source: Soccerway
Rules for classification: 1) Points; 2) Wins; 3) Goal difference; 4) Goals scored; 5) fewest red cards; 6) fewest yellow cards; 7) Draw in the headquarters of the FGF.

=== Results ===
Home \ Away	AIM	BRA	CAX	ESP	GRE	INT	JUV	NHA	PEL	SJO	SLU	YPI
Aimoré	—	—	—	2–0	—	1–6	—	2–0	—	0–1	—	0–0
Brasil (PE)	0–1	—	0–0	—	—	1–2	—	—	0–0	—	1–0	—
Caxias	3–2	—	—	2–1	0–0	—	0–0	—	—	—	4–0	2–2
Esportivo	—	0–1	—	—	0–2	—	2–2	1–2	—	1–0	—	1–1
Grêmio	2–0	4–1	—	—	—	1–0	—	3–1	4–0	—	—	—
Internacional	—	—	2–0	5–0	—	—	1–0	—	—	0–0	1–2	4–2
Juventude	1–0	2–1	—	—	2–1	—	—	—	2–3	—	1–2	—
Novo Hamburgo	—	1–1	3–0	—	—	0–1	1–3	—	1–1	1–3	—	—
Pelotas	1–2	—	1–1	0–2	—	2–2	—	—	—	—	1–1	0–2
São José-RS	—	1–2	0–1	—	1–1	—	1–0	—	1–1	—	1–0	—
São Luiz	0–0	—	—	1–1	2–2	—	—	2–0	—	—	—	0–3
Ypiranga-RS	—	1–0	—	—	2–3	—	0–1	3–3	—	4–1	—	—

Updated to match(es) played on 25 April 2021. Source: Soccerway
Legend: Blue = home team win; Yellow = draw; Red = away team win.
For upcoming matches, an "a" indicates there is an article about the rivalry between the two participants.

=== Positions by matchday ===
The table lists the positions of teams after each matchday.

Team ╲ Round	1	2	3	4	5	6	7	8	9	10	11
Grêmio	7	4	6	5	4	3	2	2	1	1	1
Internacional	4	3	5	3	1	1	1	1	2	2	2
Juventude	10	10	7	9	7	6	7	5	5	5	3
Caxias	7	5	3	4	2	5	3	4	4	4	4
Ypiranga-RS	1	2	1	2	5	4	4	3	3	3	5
São José-RS	10	11	12	10	10	10	9	10	8	8	6
Aimoré	2	1	2	6	8	7	6	7	6	6	7
São Luiz	12	7	4	1	3	2	5	6	7	9	8
Brasil (PE)	9	12	9	8	6	8	8	9	10	7	9
Novo Hamburgo	5	8	10	12	12	12	10	8	9	11	10
Esportivo	3	6	8	11	11	11	12	11	11	10	11
Pelotas	6	9	11	7	9	9	11	12	12	12	12

Qualification to Knockout stage
Relegation to Série A2

Updated to match(es) played on 25 April 2021. Source: Soccerway

== Knockout stage ==
=== Semi-finals ===
The first legs will be played on 2 May, and the second legs will be played on 8 and 9 May 2021.

Team 1	Agg.	Team 2	1st leg	2nd leg
Grêmio	4–1	Caxias	2–1	2–0
Internacional	4–2	Juventude	0–1	4–1

==== Match C1 ====
2 May 2021
19:00 UTC−3

Caxias	1–2	Grêmio
Marlon 45+2'	Report	D. Souza 23', 84' (pen.)

Estádio Centenário, Caxias do Sul
Attendance: 0
Referee: Vinícius Gomes

9 May 2021
16:00 UTC−3

Grêmio	2–0	Caxias
M. Henrique 29'; Ferreira 82'	Report

Arena do Grêmio, Porto Alegre
Attendance: 0
Referee: Jean Pierre Lima

Grêmio advances to the finals.

==== Match C2 ====
2 May 2021
16:00 UTC−3

Juventude	1–0	Internacional
M. Vinicios 72'	Report

Estádio Montanha dos Vinhedos, Bento Gonçalves (Note: The Juventude vs. Internacional match was played at the Estádio Montanha dos Vinhedos, Bento Gonçalves, instead of their regular stadium Estádio Alfredo Jaconi, Caxias do Sul, who was having his stadium renovated on the date of the match.)
Attendance: 0
Referee: Douglas Schwengber

8 May 2021
19:00 UTC−3

Internacional	4–1	Juventude
Y. Alberto 43'; Maurício 45+1'; Edenílson 63' (pen.); Rodinei 78'	Report	M. Peixoto 68' (pen.)

Estádio Beira-Rio, Porto Alegre
Attendance: 0
Referee: Daniel Bins

Internacional advances to the finals.

=== Finals ===
The first legs will be played on 16 May, and the second legs will be played on 23 May 2021.

Team 1	Agg.	Team 2	1st leg	2nd leg
Grêmio	3–2	Internacional	2–1	1–1

==== Match G1 ====
16 May 2021
16:00 UTC−3

Internacional	1–2	Grêmio
Galhardo 27'	Report	D. Souza 58'; Ricardinho 88'

Estádio Beira-Rio, Porto Alegre
Attendance: 0
Referee: Anderson Daronco

23 May 2021
16:00 UTC−3

Grêmio	1–1	Internacional
Ferreira 45+6'	Report	Dourado 67'

Arena do Grêmio, Porto Alegre
Attendance: 0
Referee: Leandro Vuaden

Grêmio win the finals.

== Overall table ==
Pos	Team	Pld	W	D	L	GF	GA	GD	Pts	Qualification or relegation
1	Grêmio	15	10	4	1	30	12	+18	34	Champions
2	Internacional	15	8	3	4	30	14	+16	27	Runners-up
3	Juventude (Note: The Countryside Championship is a symbolic title given to the best placed team in the league besides Grêmio and Internacional.)	13	6	2	5	16	16	0	20	Countryside Champions
4	Caxias (Note: The qualification for the Campeonato Brasileiro Série D is conceded to the best team that currently does not compete in any division of the Brazilian football league system.)	13	4	5	4	14	15	−1	17	Qualification to Campeonato Brasileiro Série D
5	Ypiranga-RS	11	4	4	3	20	15	+5	16	
6	São José-RS	11	4	3	4	10	11	−1	15	
7	Aimoré (Note: The qualification for the Campeonato Brasileiro Série D is conceded to the best team that currently does not compete in any division of the Brazilian football league system.)	11	4	2	5	10	14	−4	14	Qualification to Campeonato Brasileiro Série D
8	São Luiz	11	3	4	4	10	15	−5	13	
9	Brasil (PE)	11	3	3	5	8	12	−4	12	
10	Novo Hamburgo	11	2	3	6	13	20	−7	9	
11	Esportivo	11	2	3	6	9	18	−9	9	Relegation to Série A2
12	Pelotas	11	1	6	4	10	18	−8	9	Relegation to Série A2

Updated to match(es) played on 24 May 2021. Source: Soccerway
Rules for classification: 1) Points; 2) Wins; 3) Goal difference; 4) Goals scored; 5) fewest red cards; 6) fewest yellow cards; 7) Draw in the headquarters of the FGF.

== Statistics ==
=== Scoring ===
- First goal of the season:
  (Brazil) Jean Silva for Ypiranga-RS against São Luiz at Matchday 1 of First stage (27 February 2021)

==== Top scorers ====
Rank	Player	Club	Goals
1	(Brazil) Diego Souza	Grêmio	7
2	(Brazil) Thiago Galhardo	Internacional	5
3	(Brazil) Gustavo Ramos	Caxias	4
3	(Brazil) Ferreira	Grêmio	4
3	(Brazil) Ricardinho	Grêmio	4
3	(Brazil) Matheus Peixoto	Juventude	4
3	(Brazil) Yuri Alberto	Internacional	4
3	(Brazil) Hélio Paraíba	Novo Hamburgo	4
3	(Brazil) Maurício Caprini	Ypiranga-RS	4
9	12 players		3

Last updated: 24 May 2021.
Source: Soccerway.

==== Hat-tricks ====
Player	Club	Against	Result	Date
(Brazil) Ivan Martins	Caxias	Aimoré	3–2 (H)	8 March 2021
(Brazil) Thiago Galhardo	Internacional	Aimoré	6–1 (A)	14 April 2021

Last updated: 24 May 2021.
Source: Soccerway.

=== Clean sheets ===
Rank	Player	Club	Clean sheets
1	(Brazil) Brenno	Grêmio	6
2	(Brazil) Marcelo Pitol	Caxias	5
3	(Brazil) Raul Steffens	Aimoré	4
3	(Brazil) Matheus Nogueira	Brasil (PE)	4
3	(Brazil) Marcelo Carné	Juventude	4
3	(Brazil) Fábio Rampi	São José-RS	4
3	(Brazil) Deivity Martins	Ypiranga-RS	4
8	(Brazil) Daniel Britto	Internacional	3
8	(Brazil) Anderson Gavineski	Esportivo	2
8	(Brazil) Renan Rocha	São Luiz	2
10	(Brazil) Pablo Rodrigues	Aimoré	1
10	(Brazil) Danilo Fernandes	Internacional	1
10	(Brazil) Marcelo Lomba	Internacional	1
10	(Brazil) Nícolas Mödinger	Novo Hamburgo	1
10	(Brazil) Gabriel Leite	Pelotas	1

Last updated: 24 May 2021.
Source: Soccerway.

=== Discipline ===
==== Player ====
Yellow cards

Rank	Player	Club	Yellow cards
1	(Brazil) Márcio Marabá	Aimoré	5
1	(Brazil) Gustavo Ramos	Caxias	5
1	(Brazil) Lucas Hulk	Esportivo	5
1	(Brazil) Eltinho Celio	Juventude	5
1	(Brazil) Paulo Henrique Alves	Juventude	5
1	(Brazil) Marcelo Ferreira	Pelotas	5
1	(Brazil) Mikael Guterres	Ypiranga-RS	5
3	(Brazil) Itaqui Silva	Esportivo	4
3	(Brazil) Samuel Balbino	Esportivo	4
3	(Brazil) Ruan Tressoldi	Grêmio	4
3	(Brazil) João Capixaba	Juventude	4
3	(Brazil) Juliano Almeida	Pelotas	4
3	(Brazil) Moisés Dallazen	Pelotas	4
3	(Brazil) Silvio Freitas	Pelotas	4
3	(Brazil) Fabiano Santiago	São José-RS	4
3	(Brazil) Zé Mário	Ypiranga-RS	4
11	18 players		3

Red cards

Rank	Player	Club	Red cards
1	(Brazil) Jean Roberto	Aimoré	1
1	(Brazil) Márcio Marabá	Aimoré	1
1	(Brazil) Guilherme Mattis	Caxias	1
1	(Brazil) Júnior Alves	Esportivo	1
1	(Brazil) Ferreira	Grêmio	1
1	(Brazil) Léo Chú	Grêmio	1
1	(Brazil) Victor Cuesta	Internacional	1
1	(Brazil) Paulo Henrique Alves	Juventude	1
1	(Brazil) Amaral Rosa	Novo Hamburgo	1
1	(Brazil) João Pedro Vieira	Pelotas	1
1	(Brazil) Vinicius Parise	Pelotas	1
1	(Brazil) Juliano Borges	São José-RS	1
1	(Brazil) Jadson Santos	São Luiz	1
1	(Brazil) Revson Santos	Ypiranga-RS	1
1	(Brazil) Mikael Guterres	Ypiranga-RS	1

Last updated: 10 May 2021.
Source: Soccerway.

==== Team ====
Yellow cards

Rank	Club	Yellow cards
1	São José-RS	38
2	Caxias	34
2	Juventude	34
4	Brasil (PE)	33
5	Pelotas	31
6	Aimoré	28
7	Grêmio	27
7	Esportivo	27
7	Ypiranga-RS	27
10	Novo Hamburgo	24
11	Internacional	20
12	São Luiz	14

Red cards

Rank	Club	Red cards
1	Aimoré	2
1	Grêmio	2
1	Pelotas	2
1	São Luiz	2
1	Ypiranga-RS	2
6	Brasil (PE)	1
6	Caxias	1
6	Esportivo	1
6	Internacional	1
6	Juventude	1
6	Novo Hamburgo	1
6	São José-RS	1

Last updated: 10 May 2021.
Source: Soccerway.
