= Rafinha (footballer, born 1991) =

Bolivian footballer (born 1991)

Personal information
- Full name: Rafael Allan Mollercke
- Date of birth: 20 December 1991 (age 34)
- Place of birth: São Leopoldo, Brazil
- Height: 1.74 m (5 ft 9 in)
- Position: Attacking midfielder

Team information
- Current team: Guabirá
- Number: 15

Senior career*
Years	Team	Apps	(Gls)
2012	Sapucaiense		
2013	Santo Ângelo	18	(5)
2013–2018	São José-RS	80	(19)
2014	→ Cerâmica (loan)	8	(3)
2014	→ Novo Hamburgo (loan)	0	(0)
2015	→ Juventus de Seara (loan)	13	(3)
2016	→ Vila Nova (loan)	5	(0)
2017	→ Náutico (loan)	12	(1)
2018	Ypiranga-RS	16	(5)
2018	→ Juventude (loan)	5	(0)
2019–2024	Blooming	138	(44)
2025–	Guabirá	25	(9)
- * Club domestic league appearances and goals as of 30 December 2025

Rafael Allan Mollercke (born 20 December 1991), commonly known as Rafinha, is a professional footballer who plays as an attacking midfielder for Bolivian Primera División club Guabirá. Born in Brazil, he represents Bolivia at international level.

== Club career ==
Born in São Leopoldo, Rio Grande do Sul, Rafinha began his career with Sapucaiense in 2012 before moving to Santo Ângelo in the following year. After being the club's top goalscorer in the 2013 Campeonato Gaúcho Série A2, he joined São José-RS.

Rafinha served loan stints at Cerâmica and Novo Hamburgo during the 2014 season, winning the Copa Metropolitana with the latter and finishing the competition as top scorer with 12 goals. Back to Zeca for the 2015 campaign, he played regularly before agreeing to a loan deal with Série C side Vila Nova in May, but the deal fell through after he failed his medical examinations; he subsequently moved to Juventus de Seara also in a temporary deal.

On 6 May 2016, Rafinha returned to Vila, with the club now in the Série B, again on loan. Rarely used, he returned to São José in January 2017, before moving to Náutico also on loan on 12 September.

After being a regular starter for São José in the 2018 Campeonato Gaúcho, Rafinha signed a permanent deal with Ypiranga-RS on 11 April 2018. On 28 August, he was loaned to Juventude until the end of the year.

On 4 January 2019, Rafinha moved abroad and signed a one-year contract with Bolivian Primera División side Blooming. At the club, he scored a career-best 14 league goals in his first year, and subsequently became team captain.

== International career ==
In March 2024, Rafinha obtained Bolivian citizenship, and was called up to the Bolivia national team by manager Antônio Carlos Zago for two friendlies against Algeria and Andorra.

== Career statistics ==
As of 21 March 2024.

Club	Season	League			State League		Cup		Continental		Other		Total	
Club	Season	Division	Apps	Goals	Apps	Goals	Apps	Goals	Apps	Goals	Apps	Goals	Apps	Goals
Santo Ângelo	2013	Gaúcho Série A2	—		18	5	—		—		—		18	5
São José-RS	2013	Gaúcho	—		—		—		—		7 (Note: Appearance(s) in Copa FGF)	3	7	3
São José-RS	2014	Gaúcho	—		15	3	—		—		—		15	3
São José-RS	2015	Gaúcho	—		15	4	—		—		—		15	4
São José-RS	2016	Série D	0	0	16	3	—		—		—		16	3
São José-RS	2017	Série D	12	2	13	5	1	1	—		—		26	8
São José-RS	2018	Série D	0	0	9	2	—		—		—		9	2
São José-RS	Total		12	2	68	17	1	1	—		7	3	88	23
Cerâmica (loan)	2014	Gaúcho Série A2	—		8	3	—		—		—		8	3
Novo Hamburgo (loan)	2014	Gaúcho	—		—		2	0	—		15 (Note: Thirteen appearances and twelve goals in Copa Metropolitana, two appearances in Copa FGF)	12	17	12
Juventus de Seara (loan)	2015	Catarinense Série B	—		13	3	—		—		—		13	3
Vila Nova (loan)	2016	Série B	5	0	—		—		—		—		5	0
Náutico (loan)	2017	Série B	12	1	—		—		—		—		12	1
Ypiranga-RS	2018	Série C	16	5	7	1	—		—		1	1	24	7
Juventude (loan)	2018	Série B	5	0	—		—		—		—		5	0
Blooming	2019	Bolivian Primera División	31	14	—		—		—		—		31	14
Blooming	2020	Bolivian Primera División	14	3	—		—		0	0	—		8	0
Blooming	2021	Bolivian Primera División	26	7	—		—		—		—		8	0
Blooming	2022	Bolivian Primera División	34	13	—		—		—		—		8	0
Blooming	2023	Bolivian Primera División	22	9	—		—		6 (Note: Appearance(s) in Copa Sudamericana)	1	6 (Note: Appearance(s) in Copa de la División Profesional)	1	34	11
Blooming	2024	Bolivian Primera División	23	2	—		—		—		—		5	1
Blooming	Total		131	47	—		—		6	1	6	1	143	49
Career total			181	55	114	29	3	1	6	1	29	17	333	103

== Honours ==
Novo Hamburgo

- Copa Metropolitana: 2014
