= Fábio Rampi =

Brazilian footballer

Personal information
- Full name: Fábio José Rampi
- Date of birth: 23 January 1989 (age 37)
- Place of birth: Aratiba, Brazil
- Height: 1.84 m (6 ft 0 in)
- Position: Goalkeeper

Team information
- Current team: Ferroviária
- Number: 12

Youth career
- RS Futebol
- 2007–2008: São José-RS
- 2008: Cruzeiro-RS

Senior career*
Years	Team	Apps	(Gls)
2008–2014	Cruzeiro-RS	126	(0)
2014	→ São Luiz (loan)	0	(0)
2015–2026	São José-RS	329	(29)
2022	→ São Luiz (loan)	0	(0)
2026–	Ferroviária	0	(0)
- * Club domestic league appearances and goals as of 9 November 2026

Fábio José Rampi (born 23, January 1989) is a Brazilian footballer who plays as a goalkeeper for Ferroviária.

== Club career ==
Born in Aratiba, Rio Grande do Sul, Rampi represented RS Futebol and São José-RS as a youth. In 2008, he moved to Cruzeiro-RS, achieving promotion from the Campeonato Gaúcho Série A2 in 2010.

Rampi was a regular starter for Cruzeiro in the 2011 Campeonato Gaúcho, being named the best goalkeeper of the competition. He scored his first senior goal on 8 August of that year, netting the equalizer in a 2–1 Copa FGF win over Cerâmica.

In April 2014, Rampi was loaned to São Luiz for the club's 2014 Copa do Brasil run, which lasted only one further match. In 2015, he returned to São José, now for the first team.

An immediate starter, Rampi scored twice in São José's 2018 Série D campaign, which ended in promotion. In the previous years, he had also won the Super Copa Gaúcha (2015), the Copa Metropolitana (2016) and the Copa FGF (2017).

On 14 September 2022, Rampi returned to São Luiz, again on loan, and also won the Copa FGF with the club. Back to São José, he was an undisputed starter before signing for Ferroviária on 11 September 2026.

== Career statistics ==
As of 9 November 2026

Club	Season	League			State League		Cup		Continental		Other		Total	
Club	Season	Division	Apps	Goals	Apps	Goals	Apps	Goals	Apps	Goals	Apps	Goals	Apps	Goals
Cruzeiro-RS	2008	Gaúcho Série A2	—		0	0	—		—		15	0	0	0
Cruzeiro-RS	2009	Gaúcho Série A2	—		20	0	—		—		17 (Note: Appearance(s) in Copa FGF)	0	37	0
Cruzeiro-RS	2010	Gaúcho Série A2	—		37	0	—		—		9	0	46	0
Cruzeiro-RS	2011	Série D	4	0	19	0	—		—		13	2	36	2
Cruzeiro-RS	2012	Gaúcho	—		15	0	—		—		13	0	28	0
Cruzeiro-RS	2013	Gaúcho	—		15	0	—		—		15 (Note: 14 appearances in Copa Metropolitana, one appearance in Copa FGF)	0	30	0
Cruzeiro-RS	2014	Gaúcho	—		16	0	—		—		—		16	0
Cruzeiro-RS	Total		4	0	122	0	—		—		82	2	208	2
São Luiz (loan)	2014	Gaúcho	—		—		1	0	—		—		1	0
São José-RS	2015	Gaúcho	—		15	0	—		—		11 (Note: Eight appearances in Copa FGF, three appearances in Super Copa Gaúcha)	0	26	0
São José-RS	2016	Série D	6	0	16	0	—		—		13 (Note: Eleven appearances in Copa Metropolitana, two appearances in Super Copa Gaúcha)	0	35	0
São José-RS	2017	Série D	11	0	13	0	1	0	—		14	5	39	5
São José-RS	2018	Série D	14	2	15	2	—		—		14	2	43	6
São José-RS	2019	Série C	20	0	13	0	1	0	—		11	3	45	3
São José-RS	2020	Série C	18	4	11	2	4	0	—		6	0	39	6
São José-RS	2021	Série C	18	3	11	1	—		—		12	2	41	6
São José-RS	2022	Série C	19	2	11	1	—		—		—		30	3
São José-RS	2023	Série C	25	3	11	2	—		—		6	0	42	5
São José-RS	2024	Série C	19	0	12	2	—		—		12	0	43	2
São José-RS	2025	Série D	13	0	11	3	2	1	—		1 (Note: Appearance(s) in Recopa Gaúcha)	0	27	4
São José-RS	2026	Série D	20	2	7	0	—		—		—		27	2
São José-RS	Total		183	16	146	13	8	1	—		100	12	437	42
São Luiz (loan)	2022	Série D	—		—		—		—		10	0	10	0
Ferroviária	2026	Série C	0	0	—		—		—		—		0	0
Career total			187	16	268	13	9	1	0	0	192	14	656	44

== Honours ==
São José-RS

- Super Copa Gaúcha: 2015
- Copa Metropolitana: 2016
- Copa FGF: 2017, 2024

São Luiz

- Copa FGF: 2022

== See also ==
- List of goalscoring goalkeepers
