= Guilherme (footballer, born 1995) =

Brazilian footballer (born 1995)

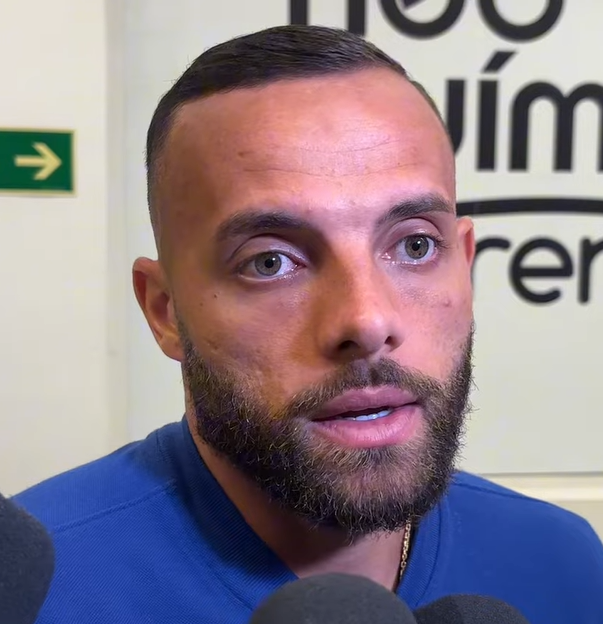
- Guilherme in 2025

Personal information
- Full name: Guilherme Augusto Vieira dos Santos
- Date of birth: 13 April 1995 (age 31)
- Place of birth: São Paulo, Brazil
- Height: 1.78 m (5 ft 10 in)
- Position: Left winger

Team information
- Current team: Houston Dynamo
- Number: 20

Youth career
- 2012–2014: Cotia
- 2014–2015: Grêmio

Senior career*
Years	Team	Apps	(Gls)
2016–2020	Grêmio	17	(0)
2015–2016	→ São José-RS (loan)	13	(1)
2017	→ Botafogo (loan)	32	(4)
2018	→ Chapecoense (loan)	10	(1)
2018	→ Coritiba (loan)	13	(2)
2019–2020	→ Sport Recife (loan)	49	(21)
2020–2022	Al-Faisaly	59	(15)
2022	Al-Dhafra	13	(5)
2022–2023	Grêmio	19	(1)
2023	→ Fortaleza (loan)	31	(3)
2024–2025	Santos	92	(27)
2026–	Houston Dynamo	30	(16)
- * Club domestic league appearances and goals as of 1:20, 2 November 2026 (UTC)

Guilherme Augusto Vieira dos Santos (born 13 April 1995), simply known as Guilherme, is a Brazilian professional footballer who plays as a left winger for Houston Dynamo.

== Career ==
=== Grêmio ===
Guilherme was born in São Paulo, and joined Grêmio's youth setup in May 2014, from Cotia, after a trial period. In 2015, he moved on loan to São José-RS until the end of the year; after helping in their Copa Sul-Fronteira and Super Copa Gaúcha titles, his loan was extended for the 2016 Campeonato Gaúcho.

Back to the Tricolor in May 2016, Guilherme made his first team – and Série A – debut on 29 June, coming on as a late substitute for Everton in a 3–2 home win over Santos.

==== Loans ====
On 19 January 2017, Guilherme was loaned to fellow top tier side Botafogo until December. Despite not being a regular starter, he became an ever-present figure during the year as his side finished 10th.

On 4 January 2018, Guilherme moved to Chapecoense also in the first division, again on loan. A regular starter in the Campeonato Catarinense, he lost his starting spot in the Série A, and moved to Série B side Coritiba on 13 August, also in a temporary deal.

On 17 January 2019, still owned by Grêmio, Guilherme was presented at Sport Recife. He was a key unit in the club's promotion to the top tier, scoring 17 goals and ending the tournament as top scorer.

=== Al-Faisaly ===
On 8 January 2020, Guilherme moved abroad after being transferred to Saudi club Al-Faisaly. An immediate starter, he scored his first goals for the club on 7 March, netting a brace in a 3–2 home win over Al Nassr.

Guilherme also helped the club to win the 2020–21 King Cup, the club's first-ever major title.

=== Al-Dhafra ===
On 20 January 2022, Guilherme joined UAE Pro League side Al-Dhafra, joining compatriots Lucas Cândido and head coach Rogério Micale. He scored five times in only 13 league appearances for the club, as they narrowly avoided relegation.

=== Grêmio return ===
On 5 July 2022, Guilherme returned to his first club Grêmio on a contract until December 2024. He contributed with one goal in 18 appearances as the side returned to the first division at first attempt.

==== Loan to Fortaleza ====
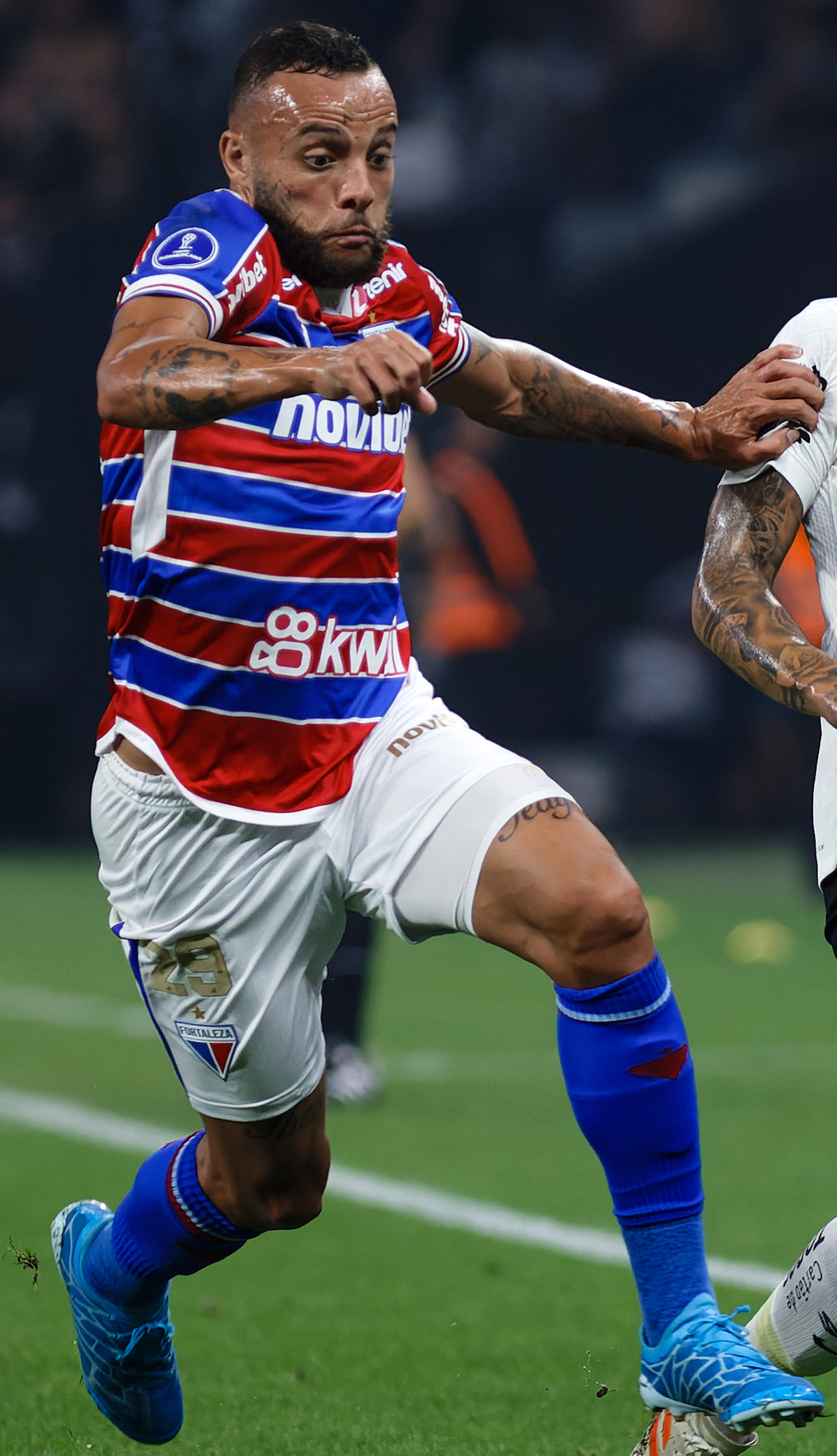
Guilherme playing for Fortaleza in 2023

On 9 February 2023, after losing space at Grêmio, Guilherme was loaned to Fortaleza in the top tier, until December. He was the club's top goalscorer in their 2023 Copa Sudamericana run, as they lost the final to LDU Quito.

=== Santos ===
On 31 December 2023, Guilherme was announced at Santos in the second division, on a three-year deal. He made his debut for the club the following 20 January, starting in a 1–0 away win over Botafogo-SP.

Guilherme scored his first goals for Peixe on 4 February 2024, netting a brace in a 2–0 home win over Guarani. He finished the year with 13 goals, being the club's top scorer as they returned to the top tier.

Guilherme started the 2025 season by scoring seven goals in his first six matches; on 1 February, he scored a brace in a 3–1 win over São Paulo, with one of his goals being the club's 13,000 goal in their history.

=== Houston Dynamo ===
On 13 January 2026, Guilherme signed a deal with Major League Soccer side Houston Dynamo until the end of the 2027–28 season.

== Career statistics ==
As of 8 December 2025

Club	Season	League			State league (Note: Includes Campeonato Gaúcho, Campeonato Carioca, Campeonato Catarinense, Campeonato Pernambucano, Campeonato Cearense, Campeonato Paulista)		National cup (Note: Includes Copa do Brasil, King's Cup, UAE League Cup)		Continental		Other		Total	
Club	Season	Division	Apps	Goals	Apps	Goals	Apps	Goals	Apps	Goals	Apps	Goals	Apps	Goals
São José-RS	2015	Gaúcho	—		0	0	—		—		20 (Note: Six appearances and three goals in Copa FGF, ten appearances and two goals in Copa Sul-Fronteira, four appearances in Super Copa Gaúcha)	5	20	5
São José-RS	2016	Série D	0	0	13	1	—		—		—		13	1
São José-RS	Total		0	0	13	1	—		—		20	5	33	6
Grêmio	2016	Série A	17	0	—		2	0	—		—		19	0
Botafogo	2017	Série A	32	4	8	0	6	2	4 (Note: Appearances in Copa Libertadores)	0	—		50	6
Chapecoense	2018	Série A	10	1	15	5	3	0	2	0	—		30	6
Coritiba	2018	Série B	13	2	—		—		—		—		13	2
Sport Recife	2019	Série B	35	17	13	4	1	0	—		—		49	21
Al–Faisaly	2019–20	Saudi Pro League	17	5	—		—		—		—		17	5
Al–Faisaly	2020–21	Saudi Pro League	29	8	—		3	0	—		—		32	8
Al–Faisaly	2021–22	Saudi Pro League	13	2	—		1	0	0	0	1 (Note: Appearance in Saudi Super Cup)	0	15	2
Al–Faisaly	Total		59	15	—		4	0	0	0	1	0	64	15
Al-Dhafra	2021–22	UAE Pro League	13	5	—		1	0	—		—		14	5
Grêmio	2022	Série B	18	1	—		—		—		—		18	1
Grêmio	2023	Série A	0	0	1	0	0	0	—		—		1	0
Grêmio	Total		18	1	1	0	0	0	—		—		19	1
Fortaleza	2023	Série A	30	3	1	0	3	1	15 (Note: Four appearances and two goals in Copa Libertadores, eleven appearances and four goals in Copa Sudamericana)	6	3 (Note: Appearance in Copa do Nordeste)	0	52	10
Santos	2024	Série B	31	10	15	3	—		—		—		46	13
Santos	2025	Série A	32	4	14	10	2	0	—		—		48	14
Santos	Total		63	14	29	13	2	0	—		—		94	27
Career total			290	62	80	23	22	3	21	6	24	5	437	99

== Honours ==
São José-RS

- Copa Sul-Fronteira: 2015
- Super Copa Gaúcha: 2015

Grêmio

- Copa do Brasil: 2016

Al-Faisaly

- King's Cup: 2020–21

Fortaleza

- Campeonato Cearense: 2023

Santos

- Série B: 2024

Individual

- 2019 Campeonato Brasileiro Série B top scorer: 17 goals
- 2025 Campeonato Paulista top scorer: 10 goals
- Campeonato Paulista Team of the Year: 2024, 2025
- MLS All-Star: 2026
