= Chiquinho (footballer, born 1966) =

Brazilian footballer

Personal information
- Full name: Neuri Carlos Testa
- Date of birth: 24 April 1966 (age 60)
- Place of birth: Aratiba, Brazil
- Position: Midfielder

Senior career*
Years	Team	Apps	(Gls)
1985–1987	Ypiranga-RS		
1988	Juventude		
1989–1990	Esportivo		
1990	Guarani		
1991	Caxias		
1991	Esportivo		
1992	Mogi Mirim		
1993–1994	Fluminense	48	(3)
1995	Veranópolis		
1996	Tubarão-SC		
1997–1998	Pelotas		
1999	Veranópolis		
1999–2000	15 de Novembro		
2000–2002	São José-RS		
2003	Veranópolis		
- * Club domestic league appearances and goals as of 11 March 2024

Neuri Carlos Testa (born 24 April 1966), better known as Chiquinho, is a Brazilian former professional footballer who played as a midfielder.

== Career ==
Right midfielder, Chiquinho played for several clubs in Rio Grande do Sul, being top scorer in the state in 2001 with 15 goals. He also had a notable spell at Fluminense FC where he made 48 appearances.

== Honours ==
Individual

- 2001 Campeonato Gaúcho top scorer: 15 goals
