= 2001 Campeonato Gaúcho =

Campeonato Gaúcho
- Season: 2001
- Champions: Grêmio
- Relegated: Avenida; Novo Hamburgo
- Copa do Brasil: Internacional; Juventude; Caxias
- Série C: Pelotas; São José; Passo Fundo
- Copa Sul-Minas: Internacional; Grêmio; Juventude; Pelotas
- Matches played: 136
- Goals scored: 382 (2.81 per match)
- Top goalscorer: Chiquinho (São José) – 15 goals
- Biggest home win: Esportivo 6-1 São Luiz (January 7, 2001); Pelotas 5-0 Santo Ângelo (January 24, 2001); Esportivo 5-0 Veranópolis (February 1, 2001); Novo Hamburgo 6-1 Avenida (February 24, 2001)
- Biggest away win: Novo Hamburgo 1-6 São José (January 29, 2001)
- Highest scoring: Novo Hamburgo 4-4 São Luiz (February 4, 2001); Esportivo 3-5 Grêmio (April 4, 2001)

The 81st season of the Campeonato Gaúcho kicked off on January 6, 2001 and ended on June 3, 2001. Seventeen teams participated. Grêmio beat Juventude in the finals and won their 33rd title. Avenida and Novo Hamburgo were relegated.

== Participating teams ==
Club	Home location	Previous season
15 de Novembro	Campo Bom	5th
Avenida	Santa Cruz do Sul	1st (Second level repechage)
Caxias	Caxias do Sul	1st
Esportivo	Bento Gonçalves	6th
Grêmio	Porto Alegre	2nd
Guarani	Venâncio Aires	9th
Internacional	Porto Alegre	3rd
Juventude	Caxias do Sul	4th
Novo Hamburgo	Novo Hamburgo	1st (Second level)
Passo Fundo	Passo Fundo	8th
Pelotas	Pelotas	14th
São José	Porto Alegre	11th
São Luiz	Ijuí	15th
São Paulo	Rio Grande	2nd (Second level)
Santa Cruz	Santa Cruz do Sul	7th
Santo Ângelo	Santo Ângelo	10th
Veranópolis	Veranópolis	12th

== System ==
The championship would have three stages:

- First phase: The thirteen teams that didn't participate in the Série A or the Série B played against each other in a single round-robin system. After 13 rounds, the four best teams qualified to the Second phase.
- Second phase: The four remaining teams joined the teams that participated in the Série A or Série B (Internacional, Grêmio, Caxias and Juventude), and played against each other twice, with the winners of each half qualifying to the Finals. The four best teams qualified to the following year's Copa Sul-Minas.
- Finals: The stage winners of the Second phase played in two matches to define the Champions.

== Championship ==
=== First phase ===
Pos	Team	Pld	W	D	L	GF	GA	GD	Pts	Qualification or relegation
1	Pelotas	12	7	3	2	23	11	+12	24	Qualified
2	Santa Cruz	12	7	3	2	18	12	+6	24	Qualified
3	São José de Porto Alegre	12	7	1	4	19	11	+8	22	Qualified
4	Esportivo	12	5	5	2	27	17	+10	20	Qualified
5	Guarani de Venâncio Aires	12	4	5	3	14	13	+1	17	
6	15 de Novembro	12	4	4	4	26	23	+3	16	
7	Passo Fundo	12	4	4	4	17	18	−1	16	
8	São Luiz	12	3	5	4	15	22	−7	14	
9	Veranópolis	12	4	1	7	17	21	−4	13	
10	São Paulo	12	2	6	4	12	15	−3	12	
11	Santo Ângelo	12	3	2	7	17	27	−10	11	
12	Novo Hamburgo	12	2	5	5	24	30	−6	11	Relegated
13	Avenida	12	2	4	6	14	25	−11	10	Relegated

Updated to match(es) played on February 24, 2001. Source: RSSSF.com
Rules for classification: 1) points; 2) wins; 3) goal difference; 4) number of goals scored.

=== First round ===
Pos	Team	Pld	W	D	L	GF	GA	GD	Pts	Qualification or relegation
1	Grêmio	7	6	1	0	18	6	+12	19	Qualified to Finals
2	Pelotas	7	4	0	3	9	9	0	12	
3	São José de Porto Alegre	7	3	2	2	8	6	+2	11	
4	Juventude	7	3	2	2	11	9	+2	11	
5	Internacional	7	3	2	2	14	13	+1	11	
6	Santa Cruz	7	2	2	3	7	9	−2	8	
7	Caxias	7	2	0	5	5	9	−4	6	
8	Esportivo	7	0	1	6	5	16	−11	1	

Updated to match(es) played on April 4, 2001. Source: RSSSF.com
Rules for classification: 1) points; 2) wins; 3) goal difference; 4) number of goals scored.

=== Second round ===
Pos	Team	Pld	W	D	L	GF	GA	GD	Pts	Qualification or relegation
1	Juventude	7	5	2	0	11	1	+10	17	Qualified to Finals
2	Caxias	7	4	1	2	8	7	+1	13	
3	Grêmio	7	3	3	1	11	4	+7	12	
4	Internacional	7	2	4	1	5	4	+1	10	
5	Pelotas	7	2	3	2	6	10	−4	9	
6	Esportivo	7	2	0	5	4	12	−8	6	
7	São José de Porto Alegre	7	1	3	3	5	9	−4	6	
8	Santa Cruz	7	0	2	5	3	8	−5	2	

Updated to match(es) played on May 20, 2001. Source: RSSSF.com
Rules for classification: 1) points; 2) wins; 3) goal difference; 4) number of goals scored.

=== Final standings ===
Pos	Team	Pld	W	D	L	GF	GA	GD	Pts	Qualification or relegation
1	Grêmio	14	9	4	1	29	10	+19	31	Qualified to Copa Sul-Minas
2	Juventude	14	8	4	2	22	10	+12	28	Qualified to Copa Sul-Minas
3	Pelotas	14	6	3	5	15	19	−4	21	Qualified to Copa Sul-Minas
4	Internacional	14	5	6	3	19	17	+2	21	Qualified to Copa Sul-Minas
5	Caxias	14	6	1	7	13	16	−3	19	
6	São José de Porto Alegre	14	4	5	5	13	15	−2	17	
7	Santa Cruz	14	2	4	8	10	17	−7	10	
8	Esportivo	14	2	1	11	9	28	−19	7	

Updated to match(es) played on May 20, 2001. Source: RSSSF.com
Rules for classification: 1) points; 2) wins; 3) goal difference; 4) number of goals scored.

=== Finals ===
Team 1	Agg.	Team 2	1st leg	2nd leg
Juventude	3–6	Grêmio	2–3	1–3

27 May 2001
Finals

Juventude	2 – 3	Grêmio
Cléber 49'; Leonardo Manzi 70'		Zinho 32'; Marcelinho Paraíba 50', 61'

Alfredo Jaconi, Caxias do Sul
Referee: Fabiano Gonçalves
3 June 2001
Finals

Grêmio	3 – 1	Juventude
Ânderson Polga 4'; Marcelinho Paraíba 54'; Eduardo Costa 71'		Dauri 79'

Olímpico, Porto Alegre
Referee: Carlos Eugênio Simon
