= 2014 Copa Metropolitana =

Copa Nestor Ludwig

Tournament details
- Country: Brazil
- Dates: 2 August – 16 November
- Teams: 7

The 2014 Copa Metropolitana (also known as the 2014 Copa Nestor Ludwig in this edition, in posthumous tribute) was the 2nd season of the Copa Metropolitana, a domestic cup in Rio Grande do Sul football, which is a knockout cup competition. The tournament began on 2 August and ended on 16 November with the final second leg.

In this year, seven clubs of the metropolitan region of the state decided to participate in the Copa Metropolitana, which varies in number of participants according to the interest of clubs in the first, second and third divisions of the Campeonato Gaúcho. This time, one of the two greatest clubs in the state, the Grêmio, will compete in the Copa Sul-Fronteira, to not let unequal with two big clubs in the same competition.

Novo Hamburgo enters in the 2014 Copa Metropolitana defending his title won in 2013, being the first champion in history.

== Format ==
In the first stage, all teams face off in round-robin, which will qualify the top four for the next phase, known as the semi-finals. At this stage, the first placed facing the fourth place and second place playing against the third placed in two matches each. The winners face off in the final two matches to define the winner of the competition.

The 2014 Copa Metropolitana winners qualify for the 2014 Super Copa Gaúcha, where it will have the opportunity to qualify for 2015 Campeonato Brasileiro Série D. The winner of the Super Copa Gaúcha also dispute the 2015 Recopa Gaúcha, against the winner of 2014 Campeonato Gaúcho at the beginning of next season.

== Clubs ==
This year, the FGF decided to change one of the two big clubs of the state to another region, the Grêmio was randomly chosen. Thus, it was moved to compete Copa Sul-Fronteira. Theoretically this makes less unequal competition. The following 7 clubs compete in the Copa Metropolitana during the 2014 edition.

Club	City	Stadium	Capacity	Division in 2014	First app	Number of apps	Titles	Last title
15 de Novembro	Campo Bom	Sady Schmidt	4,000	Série B	2013	2	—	—
Aimoré	São Leopoldo	Cristo Rei	10,000	Série A1	2013	2	—	—
Cerâmica	Gravataí	Vieirão	8,000	Série A1	2013	2	—	—
Estância Velha	Canoas	Estádio das Cabriúvas	5,000	Série B	2014	1	—	—
Internacional	Porto Alegre	Morada dos Quero-Queros	2,000	Série A1	2013	2	—	—
Novo Hamburgo	Novo Hamburgo	Estádio do Vale	6,500	Série A1	2013	2	1	2013
São José-RS	Porto Alegre	Passo D'Areia	8,000	Série A1	2013	2	—	—

== First round ==
=== Standings ===
Pos	Team	Pld	W	D	L	GF	GA	GD	Pts	Qualification
1	Internacional	4	3	0	1	11	3	+8	9	Advances to semi-finals
2	Novo Hamburgo	4	2	2	0	7	2	+5	8	Advances to semi-finals
3	São José-RS	3	2	0	1	4	3	+1	6	Advances to semi-finals
4	Cerâmica	5	1	3	1	7	9	−2	6	Advances to semi-finals
5	Aimoré	4	1	2	1	2	2	0	5	
6	Estância Velha	4	1	1	2	2	5	−3	4	
7	15 de Novembro	4	0	0	4	3	12	−9	0	

Source: FGF
Rules for classification: 1) points; 2) wins; 3) goal difference; 4) goals scored

=== Matches ===
2 August 1	15 de Novembro	1 – 5	Internacional	Campo Bom
15:00 UTC-03:00	Gustavo Colissi 42'	Report	Thales 6'; Diogo 14', 63'; Aylon 45'; Romário 82'	Stadium: Sady Schmidt; Attendance: 41; Referee: Daniel Aloysius Soder

3 August 1	Aimoré	1 – 1	Cerâmica	São Leopoldo
15:00 UTC-03:00	Lucas Silva 26'	Report	Cidinho 63'	Stadium: Cristo Rei; Attendance: 138; Referee: Eder Davi Zanella

Rescheduled 1	São José-RS	v	Novo Hamburgo	Porto Alegre
				Stadium: Passo D'Areia
Note: Match rescheduled yet no date set due to the participation of Novo Hamburgo in the Copa do Brasil.

9 August 2	Internacional	0 – 1	Aimoré	Alvorada
15:00 UTC-03:00		Report	Panambi 10'	Stadium: Morada dos Quero-Queros; Referee: Vinícius Gomes do Amaral

9 August 2	Novo Hamburgo	2 – 0	15 de Novembro	Novo Hamburgo
15:00 UTC-03:00	Juba 29'; Peixoto 42'	Report		Stadium: Estádio do Vale; Referee: Fábio Souza de Souza

9 August 2	Cerâmica	0 – 0	Estância Velha	Gravataí
15:30 UTC-03:00		Report		Stadium: Vieirão; Attendance: 13; Referee: Daniel Santos Noronha

16 August 3	Estância Velha	1 – 2	São José-RS	Campo Bom
15:00 UTC-03:00	David 56'	Report	Jajá 39'; Márcio 80'	Stadium: Sady Schmidt; Attendance: 14; Referee: Eder Davi Zanella

17 August 3	15 de Novembro	2 – 4	Cerâmica	Campo Bom
15:00 UTC-03:00	Gustavo Colissi 40'; Jardel 44'	Report	Danilo 33'; Cidinho 38', 71'; Dionatas 90+2' (o.g.)	Stadium: Sady Schmidt; Referee: Charles Martins Lemos

17 August 3	Aimoré	0 – 0	Novo Hamburgo	São Leopoldo
15:00 UTC-03:00		Report		Stadium: Cristo Rei; Attendance: 149; Referee: Anderson da Silveira Farias

23 August 4	Cerâmica	0 – 4	Internacional	Gravataí
15:00 UTC-03:00		Report	Romário 43'; Alex 56'; Taiberson 70', 75'	Stadium: Vieirão; Attendance: 61; Referee: Alessandro Vanni Mocelin

23 August 4	Novo Hamburgo	3 – 0	Estância Velha	Novo Hamburgo
15:00 UTC-03:00	Rafinha 36', 80'; Calyson 57'	Report		Stadium: Estádio do Vale; Referee: Leandro José Alflen

23 August 4	São José-RS	1 – 0	15 de Novembro	Porto Alegre
15:00 UTC-03:00	Héber Collazo 89'	Report		Stadium: Passo D'Areia; Referee: Douglas Schwengber da Silva

30 August 5	Novo Hamburgo	2 – 2	Cerâmica	Novo Hamburgo
15:00 UTC-03:00	Jonatas 21'; Rafinha 50'	Report	Cidinho 38'; Danilo 88'	Stadium: Estádio do Vale; Attendance: 44; Referee: Daniel Aloysius Soder

30 August 5	Internacional	2 – 1	São José-RS	Alvorada
15:00 UTC-03:00	Alex 36'; Maurides 75'	Report	Guilherme 82'	Stadium: Morada dos Quero-Queros; Attendance: 86; Referee: Eleno González Todeschini

31 August 5	Estância Velha	1 – 0	Aimoré	Campo Bom
15:00 UTC-03:00	Leonel 54'	Report		Stadium: Sady Schmidt; Attendance: 38; Referee: Daniel Santos Noronha

6 September 6	São José-RS	v	Aimoré	Porto Alegre
15:00 UTC-03:00				Stadium: Passo D'Areia

6 September 6	Internacional	v	Novo Hamburgo	Alvorada
15:00 UTC-03:00				Stadium: Morada dos Quero-Queros

6 September 6	15 de Novembro	v	Estância Velha	Campo Bom
17:00 UTC-03:00				Stadium: Sady Schmidt

14 September 7	Aimoré	v	15 de Novembro	São Leopoldo
15:00 UTC-03:00				Stadium: Cristo Rei

14 September 7	Estância Velha	v	Internacional	Campo Bom
15:00 UTC-03:00				Stadium: Sady Schmidt

14 September 7	Cerâmica	v	São José-RS	Gravataí
15:00 UTC-03:00				Stadium: Vieirão

== Records and statistics ==
=== Goalscorers ===
This is the complete list of goalscorers in the competition.

Rank	Player	Club	Goals
1	(Brazil) Cidinho	Cerâmica	4
2	(Brazil) Rafinha	Novo Hamburgo	3
3	(Brazil) Danilo	Cerâmica	2
3	(Brazil) Gustavo Colissi	15 de Novembro	2
3	(Brazil) Alex	Internacional	2
3	(Brazil) Diogo	Internacional	2
3	(Brazil) Romário	Internacional	2
3	(Brazil) Taiberson	Internacional	2
9	16 players		1
