= Anderson (given name) =

Anderson is a given name. Notable people with the name include:

== Footballers ==
- Anderson Simas Luciano (born 1976), known as Tcheco, attacking midfielder, started at Paraná
- Anderson Luis de Souza (born 1977), known as Deco, midfielder, started at Nacional
- Anderson Conrado (born 1978), known as Amaral, defender, started at Grêmio
- Ânderson Polga (born 1979), defender, started at Grêmio
- Anderson Cléber Beraldo (born 1980), known as Anderson, defender, started at Corinthians
- Anderson Rodney de Oliveira (born 1980), known as Babù, striker, started at Salernitana
- Anderson Conceição Xavier (born 1980), known as Xavier, defensive midfielder, started at Vitória
- Anderson Luiz de Carvalho (born 1981), known as Nenê, midfielder, started at Bahía
- Anderson Ribeiro (born 1981), striker, started at FC Arsenal Kharkiv
- Anderson Luiz Gomes Ribeiro (born 1982), known as Anderson Luiz, defender started at Flamengo
- Anderson Silva de França (born 1982), known as Anderson de Silva or Anderson, midfielder, started at Nacional
- Anderson Ricardo dos Santos (born 1983), known as Anderson, striker
- Anderson Costa (born 1984), known as Anderson, forward, started at Vasco
- Anderson Cavalo (born 1986), Brazilian forward
- Anderson Francisco da Cunha (born 1986), known as Anderson, defender, started at Portuguesa Santista
- Anderson Luís (footballer, born 1987), started at Fluminense
- Anderson Martins (born 1987), started at Vitória
- Anderson Luís de Abreu Oliveira (born 1988), midfielder, former Manchester United player
- Anderson Luiz Domingos (born 1988), known as Anderson, defender, started at Osasco-SP
- Anderson Soares de Oliveira (born 1988), known as Anderson Bamba, defender for Eintracht Frankfurt
- Anderson José Lopes de Souza (born 1993), known as Anderson Lopes, striker, plays for FC Seoul
- Anderson Silva da Paixão (born 1998), goalkeeper, plays for Santa Cruz on loan from Palmeiras

== Other athletes ==
- Anderson Brito (baseball) (born 2004), Venezuelan baseball player
- Anderson Hernández (born 1982), Dominican former Major League Baseball player, currently playing in the Mexican League
- Anderson Rodrigues (volleyball) (born 1974), Brazilian volleyball player
- Anderson Silva (born 1975), Brazilian mixed martial artist, former UFC Middleweight Champion.
- Anderson Varejão (born 1982), Brazilian National Basketball Association player

== Others ==
- Anderson Cooper (born 1967), American television personality, son of Gloria Vanderbilt
- Anderson Dawson (1863–1910), Australian politician
- Anderson Delano Macklin (1933–2001) American artist, educator

== See also ==
- Anderson (surname)
