= 2014 Copa Sul-Fronteira =

Copa Ivânio Branco de Araújo

Tournament details
- Country: Brazil
- Dates: 2 August – 16 November
- Teams: 7

The 2014 Copa Sul-Fronteira, also known as the 2014 Copa Ivânio Branco de Araújo, was the second season of the Copa Sul-Fronteira, a domestic cup in Rio Grande do Sul football, which is a knockout cup competition. The tournament began on 2 August and ended on 16 November with the final second leg.

== Format ==
In the first stage, all teams face off in round-robin, which will qualify the top four for the next phase, known as the semi-finals. At this stage, the first placed facing the fourth place and second place playing against the third placed in two matches each. The winners face off in the final two matches to define the winner of the competition.

The 2014 Copa Sul-Fronteira winners qualify for the 2014 Super Copa Gaúcha, where it will have the opportunity to qualify for 2015 Campeonato Brasileiro Série D. The winner of the Super Copa Gaúcha also dispute the 2015 Recopa Gaúcha, against the winner of 2014 Campeonato Gaúcho at the beginning of next season.

== Clubs ==
This year, the FGF decided to change one of the two big clubs of the state to Copa Sul-Fronteira, the Grêmio was randomly chosen. Theoretically this makes less unequal competitions. Also, the current champions Pelotas decided to not play the competition, giving priority to dispute of the Campeonato Brasileiro Série D in this season. The Guarany (BG) decided to not dispute the competition less than one month from the start of it. The following seven clubs will compete in the Copa Sul-Fronteira during the 2014 edition.

Club	City	Stadium	Capacity	Division in 2014	First app	Number of apps	Titles	Last title
Bagé	Bagé	Pedra Moura	12,000	Série B	2013	2	—	—
Farroupilha	Pelotas	Nicolau Fico	8,000	Série B	2013	2	—	—
Grêmio	Porto Alegre	CT Hélio Dourado	1,500	Série A1	2014	1	—	—
Guarani (VA)	Venâncio Aires	Edmundo Feix	4,000	Série B	2014	1	—	—
Lajeadense	Lajeado	Arena Alviazul	7,000	Série A1	2014	1	—	—
Santa Cruz-RS	Santa Cruz do Sul	Estádio dos Plátanos	7,000	Série A2	2014	1	—	—
São Paulo-RS	Rio Grande	Aldo Dapuzzo	11,500	Série A1	2013	2	—	—

== First round ==
=== Standings ===
Pos	Team	Pld	W	D	L	GF	GA	GD	Pts	Qualification
1	Santa Cruz-RS	5	3	1	1	7	5	+2	10	Advances to semi-finals
2	Grêmio	5	2	2	1	6	5	+1	8	Advances to semi-finals
3	Bagé	4	1	2	1	5	3	+2	5	Advances to semi-finals
4	Farroupilha	3	1	1	1	3	2	+1	4	Advances to semi-finals
5	Guarani (VA)	4	1	1	2	3	5	−2	4	
6	São Paulo-RS	4	0	3	1	4	7	−3	3	
7	Lajeadense	3	0	2	1	1	2	−1	2	

Source: FGF
Rules for classification: 1) points; 2) wins; 3) goal difference; 4) goals scored

=== Matches ===
2 August 1	Farroupilha	3 – 1	Guarani (VA)	Pelotas
15:00 UTC-03:00	Carlos Alberto 9' (pen.); Luis André 24'; Fábio Alemão 90+3'	Report	Carlão 61'	Stadium: Nicolau Fico; Attendance: 28; Referee: Rafael Rodrigo Klein

3 August 1	Lajeadense	0 – 1	Santa Cruz-RS	Lajeado
15:00 UTC-03:00		Report	Kleiton 43'	Stadium: Arena Alviazul; Attendance: 197; Referee: Jonathan B. Pinheiro

3 August 1	Grêmio	1 – 1	Bagé	Bagé
15:30 UTC-03:00	Leandro Canhoto 33'	Report	Fernandinho 8'	Stadium: Pedra Moura; Attendance: 535; Referee: Anderson da Silveira Farias

9 August 2	São Paulo-RS	1 – 1	Lajeadense	Pelotas
15:00 UTC-03:00	Mano Garcia 90'	Report	Mateus 8'	Stadium: Nicolau Fico; Referee: Rogério Fonseca Espilman

11 August 2	Bagé	0 – 0	Farroupilha	Bagé
19:30 UTC-03:00		Report		Stadium: Pedra Moura; Attendance: 23; Referee: Peterson L. Regert

11 August 2	Santa Cruz-RS	1 – 2	Grêmio	Santa Cruz do Sul
20:00 UTC-03:00	Ramon 90+2'	Report	Marcos Paulo 8'; Leandro Canhoto 61'	Stadium: Estádio dos Plátanos; Attendance: 117; Referee: Lucas Guimarães R. Horn

16 August 3	Grêmio	2 – 2	São Paulo-RS	Eldorado do Sul
15:00 UTC-03:00	Jeferson 51'; Marcos Paulo 52'	Report	Marcos Paulo 16' (o.g.); Diego Sapata 54'	Stadium: CT Hélio Dourado; Referee: Leandro José Alflen

17 August 3	Santa Cruz-RS	2 – 1	Bagé	Santa Cruz do Sul
15:00 UTC-03:00	Caio 38'; Rafinha 53'	Report	Fernandinho 90'	Stadium: Estádio dos Plátanos; Attendance: 135; Referee: Daniel Santos Noronha

17 August 3	Lajeadense	0 – 0	Guarani (VA)	Lajeado
15:00 UTC-03:00		Report		Stadium: Arena Alviazul; Referee: Fábio Souza de Souza

24 August 4	São Paulo-RS	1 – 1	Santa Cruz-RS	Rio Grande
15:00 UTC-03:00	Mano Garcia 42'	Report	Wiliam Campos 70'	Stadium: Aldo Dapuzzo; Referee: Eduardo Maia da Luz

24 August 4	Guarani (VA)	1 – 0	Grêmio	Venâncio Aires
19:00 UTC-03:00	Paulinho	Report		Stadium: Edmundo Feix

Rescheduled 4	Farroupilha	v	Lajeadense	Pelotas
				Stadium: Nicolau Fico

30 August 5	Grêmio	1 – 0	Farroupilha	Eldorado do Sul
15:00 UTC-03:00	Marcos Paulo 13'	Report		Stadium: CT Hélio Dourado; Referee: Alessandro Vanni Mocelin

30 August 5	Santa Cruz-RS	2 – 1	Guarani (VA)	Santa Cruz do Sul
15:30 UTC-03:00	Kleyton 3'; Ramon 49'	Report	Carlinhos 90+1'	Stadium: Estádio dos Plátanos; Referee: Marcelo Cavalheiro Pereira

31 August 5	Bagé	3 – 0	São Paulo-RS	Bagé
15:00 UTC-03:00	Fernandinho 54', 63'; Gabriel 81'	Report		Stadium: Pedra Moura; Referee: Sérgio Rodrigues de Ávila

7 September 6	Santa Cruz-RS	v	Farroupilha	Santa Cruz do Sul
15:00 UTC-03:00				Stadium: Estádio dos Plátanos

7 September 6	São Paulo-RS	v	Guarani (VA)	Rio Grande
15:00 UTC-03:00				Stadium: Aldo Dapuzzo

7 September 6	Bagé	v	Lajeadense	Bagé
15:00 UTC-03:00				Stadium: Pedra Moura

14 September 7	Guarani (VA)	v	Bagé	Venâncio Aires
15:00 UTC-03:00				Stadium: Edmundo Feix

14 September 7	Lajeadense	v	Grêmio	Lajeado
15:00 UTC-03:00				Stadium: Arena Alviazul

14 September 7	Farroupilha	v	São Paulo-RS	Pelotas
15:00 UTC-03:00				Stadium: Nicolau Fico
