= Marabá (footballer) =

Brazilian footballer

Personal information
- Full name: Márcio da Silva Gomes
- Date of birth: August 7, 1986 (age 40)
- Place of birth: São Miguel do Guamá, Brazil
- Height: 1.74 m (5 ft 9 in)
- Position: Midfielder

Team information
- Current team: Caxias

Youth career
- 2004: Paysandu

Senior career*
Years	Team	Apps	(Gls)
2005	Paysandu		
2006–2008	Flamengo		
2006	→ Goytacaz (loan)		
2006–2007	→ Fortaleza (loan)		
2007–2008	→ Ipatinga (loan)		
2009	Carajás		
2009	São Raimundo-PA		
2010–2012	São José-RS		
2012	ABC		
2013	Boa Esporte		
2014–2016	Lajeadense		
2017–	Caxias		
- * Club domestic league appearances and goals as of 31 January 2011

Márcio da Silva Gomes, aka Marabá (born August 7, 1986 in São Miguel do Guamá, Pará), is a Brazilian footballer who plays for Boa Esporte Clube as a defensive midfielder.
