= Anderson Luís =

Anderson Luís (Anderson Luiz) is a Portuguese given name, may refer to:

- Anderson Luís de Azevedo Rodrigues Marques known as Anderson Luís (born 1987), Brazilian footballer, youths internationals in 2007 South American Youth Championship
- Anderson Luiz Gomes Ribeiro, known as Anderson Luiz (born 1982), Brazilian footballer
- Anderson (footballer, born 1988) (born 1988), Brazilian footballer
- Anderson Luís (footballer, born 1988), Anderson Luís Ribeiro Pereira, Brazilian football right-back
- Anderson Luiz Domingos, known as just Anderson (born 1988), Brazilian footballer
- Deco, real name Anderson Luís de Souza (born 1977), naturalized Portuguese footballer
- Luisão, real name Anderson Luís da Silva (born 1981), Brazilian international footballer
- Nenê, real name Anderson Luis de Carvalho (born 1981), Brazilian footballer
- Paquito, real name Anderson Luiz Pinheiro (born 1981) Italian–Brazilian footballer
