= São Leopoldo Insurrection =

- Part of the Ragamuffin War
Date	21 January 1836
Location	São Leopoldo colony, Rio Grande do Sul, Empire of Brazil
Result	Insurrection successful

Belligerents
Ragamuffin rebels	Empire of Brazil

Commanders and leaders
Hermann von Salisch	João P. Mena Barreto; Viscount of Castro

Strength
~50 men	330 men

Casualties and losses
None	280 men deserted

The São Leopoldo Insurrection was an episode of the Ragamuffin War in 21 January 1836, when ragamuffin rebels under Captain Hermann von Salisch convinced German colonists from the São Leopoldo colony (near modern São Leopoldo) to mutiny against their Imperial commanders in the colony, Brigadier Mena Barreto and the Viscount of Castro.

== Events ==
German immigrant Hermann von Salisch was the foremost sympathizer for the rebel side in the São Leopoldo colony, located in modern Rio Grande do Sul, during the Ragamuffin War. He had settled there in 1824 after his unit in the Army, the 27th Caçadores Battalion, was dissolved; he served in it as an officer. In 1836, a year after Porto Alegre had been taken by the rebels, Salisch went from there to the colony, under orders to make the Imperial supporters under Brigadier João Propício Mena Barreto in nearby São Leopoldo disband. Salisch, commanding circa 50 Brazilians and some colonists, faced the Brigadier's 50 Portuguese troops, and another 280 German men, 80 of them cavalrymen and the rest infantry; they had been moving to occupy the left bank of the Sinos river.

The rebel leader received permission to have a brief conversation with the Brigadier. He then proceeded to make a speech to the German troops under Imperial command in German, which Mena Barreto did not speak. Salisch's words are not recorded, but he managed to convince the Germans to abandon the Imperial ranks, many of them joining the rebel armies, and some returning to their homes.
