= Ruy Carlos Ostermann =

Brazilian politician (1934–2025)

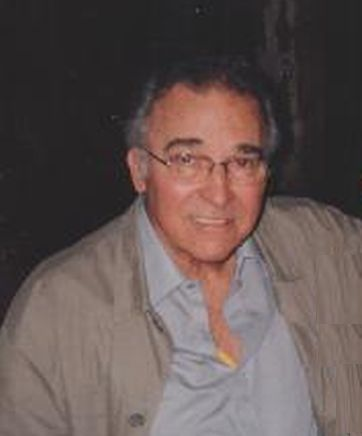
- Ostermann in 2008

Member of the Legislative Assembly of Rio Grande do Sul
- In office 1 February 1983 – 31 January 1991

Personal details
- Born: 26 September 1934; São Leopoldo, Brazil
- Died: 27 June 2025 (aged 90); Porto Alegre, Brazil
- Political party: PMDB
- Education: Federal University of Rio Grande do Sul
- Occupation: Writer

Ruy Carlos Ostermann (26 September 1934 – 27 June 2025) was a Brazilian journalist, writer, academic and politician. A member of the Brazilian Democratic Movement Party, he served in the Legislative Assembly of Rio Grande do Sul from 1983 to 1991.

Ostermann died of complications from pneumonia in Porto Alegre, on 27 June 2025, at the age of 90.
