= Copa Sul-Fronteira =

- Founded: 2013
- Abolished: 2016
- Region: Rio Grande do Sul
- Number of teams: 7
- Website: Official website

The Campeonato da Região Sul-Fronteira, commonly known as the Copa Sul-Fronteira, is an annual competition organized by the Rio Grande do Sul state football federation for clubs that are in the first, second and third divisions of the Campeonato Gaúcho and are located in the southern half of the state . It is held in the second half of the year and usually clubs participating in the higher levels of the Campeonato Brasileiro do not participate with the first team squad, using his academy.

The competition was founded in 2013, being a qualifying tournament for the Super Copa Gaúcha, where the winner ensures participation in the Campeonato Brasileiro Série D of the following year. The Copa Sul-Fronteira occasionally receive a different name, honoring important people related to football in Rio Grande do Sul. The 2014 edition is called Copa Ivânio Branco de Araújo, in posthumous tribute to former Brasil (PE) president who died in November 2012.

The current holders are Pelotas, having beaten their biggest rival Brasil (PE) by criterion of goal away after 2–2 aggregate in the 2013 finals. With this title, the Pelotas became the first winner of the Copa Sul-Fronteira in history.

== History ==
Over the past decades, one of the major problems of Brazilian football has been the lack of an annual schedule for smaller clubs. These teams usually played in the state leagues and in the rest of the year closed, only reopening in the following year. Thus, FGF decided to create new competitions for this to not occur more, creating three regional tournaments: the Copa Sul-Fronteira, the Copa Metropolitana and the Copa Serrana. Along with the traditional domestic cup, the Copa FGF, the winners qualify for the Super Copa Gaúcha, where the four clubs play a qualification for the Campeonato Brasileiro Série D and also a place in the dispute of the state supercup, the Recopa Gaúcha, against the champion of the Campeonato Gaúcho.

The first edition of the Copa Sul-Fronteira was held in the second half of 2013, with the participation of five clubs of the southern half of the state. The finals was played between Pelotas, winner of the first round, and Brasil (PE), winner of the second round. The Pelotas won by criterion of goal away after 2–2 aggregate, winning the first title.

== Format ==
=== Competition ===
In the first stage, all teams face off in round-robin, which will qualify the top four for the next phase, known as the semi-finals. At this stage, the first placed facing the fourth place and second place playing against the third placed in two matches each. The winners face off in the final two matches to define the winner of the competition.

=== Qualification for competitions ===
The Copa Sul-Fronteira winners qualify for the Super Copa Gaúcha, where it will have the opportunity to qualify for next year's Campeonato Brasileiro Série D. The winner of the Super Copa Gaúcha also dispute the Recopa Gaúcha, against the winner of Campeonato Gaúcho at the beginning of next season.

== Clubs ==
Having been established in 2013, the Copa Sul-Fronteira is played by clubs located in the southern half of the Rio Grande do Sul and compete in the first, second or third division of the Campeonato Gaúcho. In some cases, clubs of the Metropolitan Porto Alegre compete in the cup, usually Grêmio or Internacional, to theoretically equal the competitions and let everyone on equal conditions. The following seven clubs will compete in the Copa Sul-Fronteira during the 2014 edition.

Club	City	Stadium	Capacity	Division in 2014	First app	Number of apps	Titles	Last title
Bagé	Bagé	Pedra Moura	12,000	Série B	2013	2	—	—
Farroupilha	Pelotas	Nicolau Fico	8,000	Série B	2013	2	—	—
Grêmio	Porto Alegre	CT Hélio Dourado	1,500	Série A1	2014	1	—	—
Guarani (VA)	Venâncio Aires	Edmundo Feix	4,000	Série B	2014	1	—	—
Lajeadense	Lajeado	Arena Alviazul	7,000	Série A1	2014	1	—	—
Santa Cruz-RS	Santa Cruz do Sul	Estádio dos Plátanos	7,000	Série A2	2014	1	—	—
São Paulo-RS	Rio Grande	Aldo Dapuzzo	11,500	Série A1	2013	2	—	—

== Records and statistics ==
=== List of champions ===
Below is the complete list of winners and runners-up of the competition.

Season	Champions	Runners-up
2013	Pelotas (1)	Brasil de Pelotas
2014	Lajeadense (1)	Grêmio B
2015	São José (1)	Internacional B
2016	Internacional B (1)	Bagé

=== Goalscorers ===
Are exposed here the goalscorers of all editions of the competition.

Season	Player(s)	Club(s)	Goals
2013	(Brazil) Willian Kozlowski	Brasil (PE)	5
2014	—	—	—

== See also ==
- Campeonato Gaúcho
- Campeonato Gaúcho Série A2
- Campeonato Gaúcho Série B
- Recopa Gaúcha
- Super Copa Gaúcha
- Copa FGF
- Copa Metropolitana
- Copa Serrana
