= Juliano (footballer, born 1994) =

Brazilian footballer

Personal information
- Full name: Juliano Silva Almeida
- Date of birth: 28 November 1994 (age 31)
- Place of birth: Lavras, Brazil
- Height: 1.77 m (5 ft 9 1/2 in)
- Position: Defensive midfielder

Team information
- Current team: Bangu

Youth career
- XV de Piracicaba

Senior career*
Years	Team	Apps	(Gls)
2014–2016	XV de Piracicaba	8	(0)
2015	→ Metropolitano (loan)	4	(0)
2016	Olímpia	0	(0)
2017	Penapolense	14	(2)
2017–2019	Santos	0	(0)
2019	→ Ponte Preta (loan)	2	(0)
2020–	Bangu	19	(3)
- * Club domestic league appearances and goals as of 23:41, 2 November 2020 (UTC)

Juliano Silva Almeida (born 28 November 1994), simply known as Juliano, is a Brazilian footballer who plays for Bangu as a defensive midfielder.

== Club career ==
Born in Lavras, Minas Gerais, Juliano finished his formation with XV de Piracicaba. He made his first team debut on 3 August 2013, coming on as a half-time substitute for Jonathan Cafu in a 1–0 Copa Paulista home win against São Carlos.

Juliano made his professional debut on 18 February 2014, in a 1–1 away draw against Mogi Mirim for the Campeonato Paulista championship. On 5 August of the following year, he was loaned to Série D club Metropolitano until the end of the year.

After his contract expired, Juliano went on to appear for Olímpia, Penapolense and Santos B in quick succession. In late August 2018, he also took part of the first team trainings after being promoted by manager Cuca.

On 24 January 2019, Juliano was loaned to Ponte Preta for the season.

== Career statistics ==
As of 27 October 2023

Club	Season	League			State League		Cup		Continental		Other		Total	
Club	Season	Division	Apps	Goals	Apps	Goals	Apps	Goals	Apps	Goals	Apps	Goals	Apps	Goals
XV de Piracicaba	2013	Paulista	—		0	0	—		—		4 (Note: Appearance(s) in Copa Paulista)	0	4	0
XV de Piracicaba	2014	Paulista	—		4	0	—		—		20	2	24	2
XV de Piracicaba	2015	Paulista	—		4	0	—		—		1	0	5	0
XV de Piracicaba	2016	Paulista A2	—		0	0	—		—		—		0	0
XV de Piracicaba	Total		—		8	0	—		—		25	2	33	2
Metropolitano (loan)	2015	Série D	4	0	—		—		—		—		4	0
Olímpia	2016	Paulista A3	—		0	0	—		—		4	0	4	0
Penapolense	2017	Paulista A2	—		14	2	—		—		—		14	2
Santos	2017	Série A	0	0	—		—		—		3	0	3	0
Santos	2018	Série A	0	0	—		—		—		4	0	4	0
Santos	Total		0	0	—		—		—		7	0	7	0
Ponte Preta (loan)	2019	Série B	0	0	2	0	0	0	—		—		2	0
Bangu	2020	Série D	8	0	11	3	1	0	—		—		20	3
Pelotas	2021	Gaúcho	—		10	1	—		—		—		10	1
Avenida	2021	Gaúcho A2	—		13	1	—		—		—		13	1
Total			12	0	58	7	1	0	0	0	36	2	107	9
