= Copa Metropolitana =

- Founded: 2013
- Abolished: 2016
- Region: Rio Grande do Sul
- Number of teams: 7
- Most successful club(s): Novo Hamburgo (2 titles)
- Website: Official website

The Campeonato da Região Metropolitana, commonly known as the Copa Metropolitana, is an annual competition organized by the Rio Grande do Sul state football federation for clubs that are in the first, second and third divisions of the Campeonato Gaúcho and are located in the Metropolitan Porto Alegre. It is held in the second half of the year and usually clubs participating in the higher levels of the Campeonato Brasileiro do not participate with the first team squad, using his academy.

The competition was founded in 2013, being a qualifying tournament for the Super Copa Gaúcha, where the winner ensures participation in the Campeonato Brasileiro Série D of the following year. The Copa Metropolitana occasionally receive a different name, honoring important people related to football in Rio Grande do Sul. The 2014 edition is called Copa Nestor Ludwig, in posthumous tribute to former Internacional director who died in September 2013.

The current holders are Novo Hamburgo, having beaten Internacional by 2–1 aggregate in the 2013 finals. With this title, the Novo Hamburgo became the first winner of the Copa Metropolitana in history.

== History ==
Over the past decades, one of the major problems of Brazilian football has been the lack of an annual schedule for smaller clubs. These teams usually played in the state leagues and in the rest of the year closed, only reopening in the following year. Thus, FGF decided to create new competitions for this to not occur more, creating three regional tournaments: the Copa Metropolitana, the Copa Serrana and the Copa Sul-Fronteira. Along with the traditional domestic cup, the Copa FGF, the winners qualify for the Super Copa Gaúcha, where the four clubs play a qualification for the Campeonato Brasileiro Série D and also a place in the dispute of the state supercup, the Recopa Gaúcha, against the champion of the Campeonato Gaúcho.

The first edition of the Copa Metropolitana was held in the second half of 2013, with the participation of eight clubs of the metropolitan region. The finals was played between Novo Hamburgo, winner of the first round, and Internacional, winner of the second round. The Novo Hamburgo won by 2–1 aggregate, winning the first title.

== Format ==
=== Competition ===
In the first stage, all teams face off in round-robin, which will qualify the top four for the next phase, known as the semi-finals. At this stage, the first placed facing the fourth place and second place playing against the third placed in two matches each. The winners face off in the final two matches to define the winner of the competition.

=== Qualification for competitions ===
The Copa Metropolitana winners qualify for the Super Copa Gaúcha, where it will have the opportunity to qualify for next year's Campeonato Brasileiro Série D. The winner of the Super Copa Gaúcha also dispute the Recopa Gaúcha, against the winner of Campeonato Gaúcho at the beginning of next season.

== Clubs ==
Having been established in 2013, the Copa Metropolitana is played by clubs located in the Metropolitan Porto Alegre and compete in the first, second or third division of the Campeonato Gaúcho. In some cases, clubs outside the metropolitan region compete in the tournament, occupying the space left by Grêmio or Internacional, who do not play together the competition because are very large compared to others teams and theoretically make unequal competition. Thus, one often dispute the Copa Serrana or the Copa Sul-Fronteira. The following 7 clubs will compete in the Copa Metropolitana during the 2014 edition.

Club	City	Stadium	Capacity	Division in 2014	First app	Number of apps	Titles	Last title
15 de Novembro	Campo Bom	Sady Schmidt	4,000	Série B	2013	2	—	—
Aimoré	São Leopoldo	Cristo Rei	10,000	Série A1	2013	2	—	—
Cerâmica	Gravataí	Vieirão	8,000	Série A1	2013	2	—	—
Estância Velha	Canoas	Estádio das Cabriúvas	5,000	Série B	2014	1	—	—
Internacional	Porto Alegre	Morada dos Quero-Queros	2,000	Série A1	2013	2	—	—
Novo Hamburgo	Novo Hamburgo	Estádio do Vale	6,500	Série A1	2013	2	1	2013
São José-RS	Porto Alegre	Passo D'Areia	8,000	Série A1	2013	2	—	—

== Records and statistics ==
=== List of champions ===
Below is the complete list of winners and runners-up of the competition.

Season	Champions	Runners-up
2013	Novo Hamburgo (1)	Internacional B
2014	Novo Hamburgo (2)	Internacional B
2015	Cruzeiro (1)	Juventude B
2016	São José (1)	Novo Hamburgo

=== Goalscorers ===
Are exposed here the goalscorers of all editions of the competition.

Season	Player(s)	Club(s)	Goals
2013	(Brazil) Lucas Santos (Brazil) Diogo (Brazil) Maicon Santana	Novo Hamburgo; Novo Hamburgo; Cerâmica	4
2014	—	—	—

== See also ==
- Campeonato Gaúcho
- Campeonato Gaúcho (lower levels)
- Copa FGF
- Copa Sul-Fronteira
- Copa Serrana
