= Estádio Boca do Lobo =

Stadium in Pelotas, Brazil

Coordinates: 31°45′40″S 52°20′10″W

- Estádio Boca do Lobo
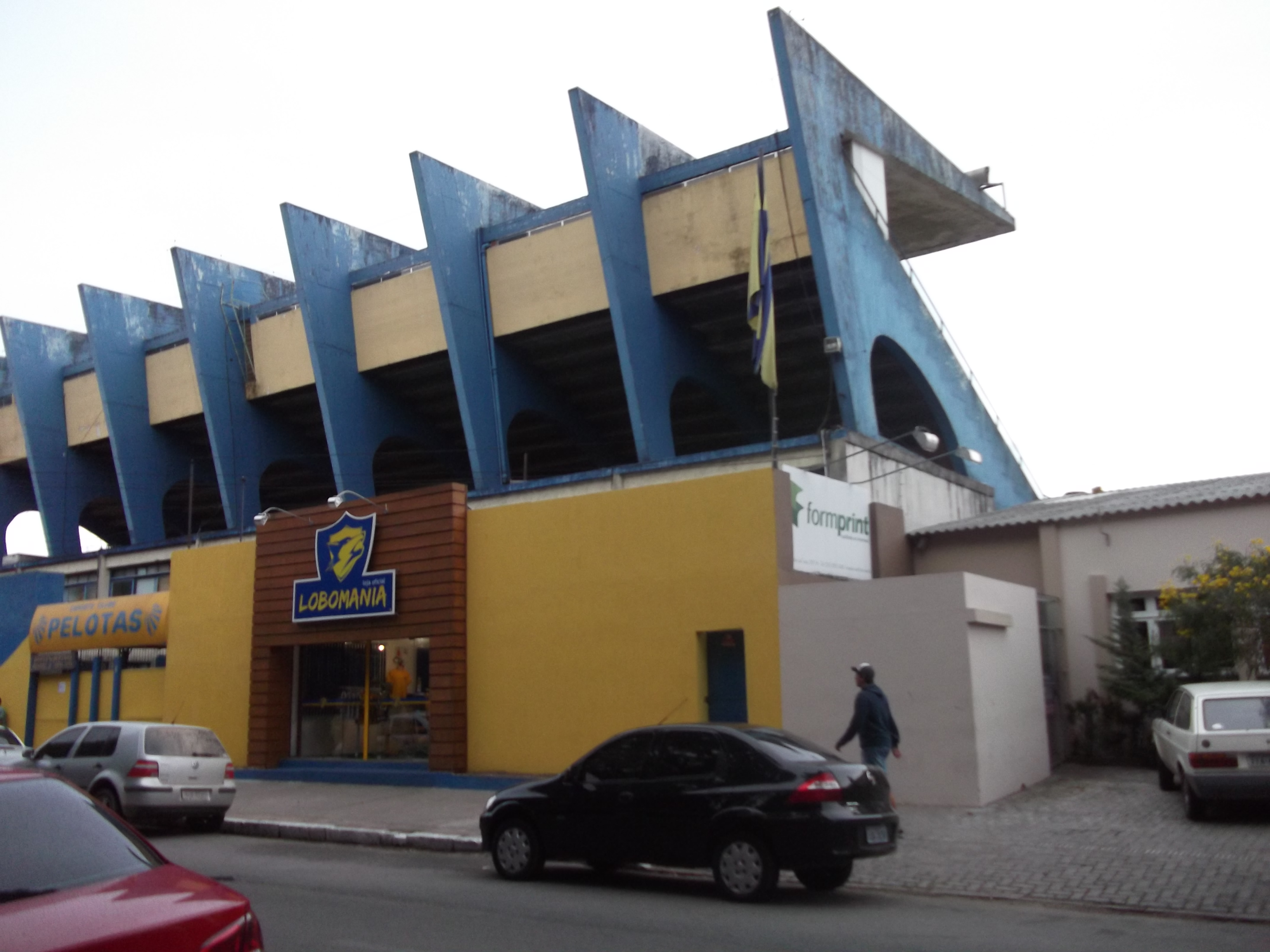
- Sisbrace
- Interactive map of Estádio Boca do Lobo
- Full name: Estádio Boca do Lobo
- Location: Pelotas, Rio Grande do Sul, Brazil
- Capacity: 18,000
- Surface: Grass

Construction
- Opened: 1917

Tenant
- Esporte Clube Pelotas

Estádio Boca do Lobo is a stadium in Pelotas, Brazil. It has a capacity of 18,000 spectators. It is the home of Esporte Clube Pelotas.
