= Anderson Mineiro (footballer, born 1986) =

Brazilian footballer

Personal information
- Full name: Anderson Francisco da Cunha
- Date of birth: April 15, 1986 (age 40)
- Place of birth: Rio de Janeiro, Brazil
- Height: 1.75 m (5 ft 9 in)
- Position: Defender

Team information
- Current team: Portuguesa (RJ)

Senior career*
Years	Team	Apps	(Gls)
2007–2008	Portuguesa (RJ)	0	(0)
2008	→ Olaria (loan)	0	(0)
2008	Alania Vladikavkaz	12	(0)
2009–2011	Portuguesa (RJ)	0	(0)
2012	Duque de Caxias		
2013–	Walter Ormeño de Cañete		
- * Club domestic league appearances and goals as of 1 January 2009

Anderson Francisco da Cunha, commonly known as Anderson Mineiro (born April 15, 1986) is a Brazilian footballer who plays for Walter Ormeño de Cañete.

In 2008 season, he played for Olaria since February, and then in August he moved to FC Alania Vladikavkaz.
