= Super Copa Gaúcha =

- Organising body: FGF
- Founded: 2013
- Abolished: 2016
- Region: Rio Grande do Sul, Brazil
- Related competitions: Campeonato Gaúcho; Copa FGF
- Television broadcasters: SporTV

The Super Copa Gaúcha (English: Rio Grande do Sul Supercup), was a tournament organized by the FGF during 2013 to 2016 reuniting the winners of Copa Metropolitana, Copa Serrana (Copa Norte), Copa Sul-Fronteira (Copa Sul), and Copa FGF. The winner of the competition won the classification for the Copa do Brasil of the next season, and for the Recopa Gaúcha.

== List of champions ==
Following is the list with all the champions of the Super Copa Gaúcha.

Season	Champions	Runners-up
2013	Pelotas (1)	Internacional
2014	Lajeadense (1)	Novo Hamburgo
2015	São José (1)	Cruzeiro
2016	Internacional (1)	Ypiranga
