= Anderson (footballer, born September 1988) =

Brazilian footballer

Personal information
- Full name: Anderson Luiz Domingos
- Date of birth: September 15, 1988 (age 38)
- Place of birth: São Paulo, Brazil
- Height: 1.70 m (5 ft 7 in)
- Position: Left back

Team information
- Current team: Sergipe

Youth career
- 2003–2006: Osasco-SP

Senior career*
Years	Team	Apps	(Gls)
2007–2009	Cruzeiro	2	(0)
2008–2009	→ Ipatinga (loan)	2	(0)
2009–2010	Joinville		
2010	Bragantino	5	(0)
2010	Ponte Preta	1	(0)
2011	Sertãozinho		
2011	Luverdense		
2011	Americana	3	(0)
2012–	Sergipe		
- * Club domestic league appearances and goals

Anderson Luis Domingos or simply Anderson (born September 15, 1988) is a Brazilian footballer who plays as a left back for Club Sportivo Sergipe.

He made his professional debut for Cruzeiro in a 0–3 home defeat to Corinthians in the Campeonato Brasileiro, on May 20, 2007, coming on as a half-time substitute for Léo Fortunato.
