= Copa FGF =

- Founded: 2004
- Region: Rio Grande do Sul
- Teams: 22
- Current champions: Gramadense (1st)
- Most championships: Internacional; Juventude; Lajeadense; Novo Hamburgo; Pelotas; São Luiz; São José (2 titles each)
- Website: Official website

The Copa Federação Gaúcha de Futebol, commonly known as the Copa FGF, is an annual cup competition organized by the Rio Grande do Sul state football federation for clubs that are in the first, second and third divisions of the Campeonato Gaúcho. It is held in the second half of the year and usually clubs participating in the higher levels of the Campeonato Brasileiro do not participate with the first team squad, using their academies.

The competition was founded in 2004 being the most important knockout cup competition in Rio Grande do Sul football. It was created with the objective of filling the calendar of smaller teams, as the Campeonato Gaúcho runs only in the first months of the year, leaving many smaller teams of the state without games to play on the rest of the year, thus, the Copa FGF is considered a competition that values local Gaúcho football, because the greatest clubs in the state, Grêmio and Internacional, usually play the cup with their academy teams, opening up the possibility of smaller clubs of the state win the title. The winners of the Copa FGF faces the winners of the Campeonato Gaúcho at the super cup Recopa Gaúcha.

The Copa FGF usually receive a different name in each edition, honoring important people related to football in Rio Grande do Sul. The 2014 edition is called Copa Fernandão, in posthumous tribute to former Internacional footballer who died in June of the same year.

== Format ==
=== Competition ===
The competition is a knockout tournament with pairings for first round (round of 22) drawn at random, being the best placed club in the FGF Club Ranking plays the first leg at away. If that club wins by a difference of two or more goals, it will be automatically qualified for the next round. The same rules serves to Round of 12. From the quarter-finals, the order of matches is decided by lot and the second leg is required.

Twenty-two clubs beginning in the round of 22, being the winners and the best loser advancing to the second round. In the round of 12, the winners and the two best losers qualify for the quarter-finals. Thereafter, only the winners advance to the semifinals and the finals.

=== Qualification for competitions ===
The Copa FGF winners qualify for the following season's Copa do Brasil. Currently, the competition does not grant more qualifying for the Campeonato Brasileiro Série D, because since the creation of the Super Copa Gaúcha, this new competition received that right for the champion. However, the Copa FGF winner also qualifies for this cup, having the opportunity to qualify for the Campeonato Brasileiro Série D.

== Champions ==
Following is the list with all champions and runners-up:

Season	Name	Champions	Runners-up
2004	Copa LG/Colombo	Esportivo	Gaúcho
2005	Copa FGF	Novo Hamburgo	Ulbra
2006	Copa FGF	Grêmio	Ulbra
2007	Copa Rogério Amoretty	Caxias	Brasil de Pelotas
2008	Copa Lupi Martins	Pelotas	Cerâmica
2009	Copa Arthur Dallegrave	Internacional B	Ypiranga
2010	Copa Enio Costamilan	Internacional	Cerâmica
2011	Copa Dra. Lacy Ughini	Juventude	Lajeadense
2012	Copa Hélio Dourado	Juventude	Brasil de Pelotas
2013	Copa Willy Sanvitto	Novo Hamburgo	São José
2014	Copa Fernandão	Lajeadense	Guarani-VA
2015	Copa Luiz Fernando Costa	Lajeadense	Pelotas
2016	Not held		
2017	Copa Paulo Sant'Ana	São José	Aimoré
2018	Copa Wianey Carlet	Avenida	Gaúcho
2019	Copa Seu Verardi	Pelotas	São José
2020	Troféu Ibsen Pinheiro	Santa Cruz	São José
2021	Troféu Dirceu de Castro	Glória	Novo Hamburgo
2022	Troféu Tarciso Flecha Negra	São Luiz	Passo Fundo
2023	Copa Rei Pelé	São Luiz	São José
2024	Copa Zagallo	São José	Ypiranga
2025	Copa Prof. Ruy Carlos Ostermann	Brasil de Pelotas	Aimoré
2026	Copa Carlos Caetano Verri	Gramadense	Brasil de Pelotas

== Records and statistics ==
=== List of champions ===
Below is the complete list of winners and runners-up of the competition.

Club	Won	Runner-up	Years won	Years runner-up
São José	2	4	2017, 2024	2013, 2019, 2020, 2023
Lajeadense	2	1	2014, 2015	2011
Pelotas	2	1	2008, 2019	2015
Novo Hamburgo	2	1	2005, 2013	2021
Juventude	2	0	2011, 2012	—
Internacional	2	0	2009, 2010	—
São Luiz	2	0	2022, 2023	–
Brasil de Pelotas	1	3	2025	2007, 2012, 2026
Santa Cruz	1	0	2020	—
Avenida	1	0	2018	—
Caxias	1	0	2007	—
Grêmio	1	0	2006	—
Esportivo	1	0	2004	—
Glória	1	0	2021	—
Gramadense	1	0	2026	—
Gaúcho	0	2	—	2004, 2018
Canoas	0	2	—	2005, 2006
Cerâmica	0	2	—	2008, 2010
Ypiranga	0	2	—	2009, 2024
Aimoré	0	2	—	2017, 2025
Passo Fundo	0	1	-	2022
Guarani-VA	0	1	—	2014

== See also ==
- Campeonato Gaúcho
- Campeonato Gaúcho Série A2
- Campeonato Gaúcho Série B
- Copa Metropolitana
- Copa Sul-Fronteira
- Copa Serrana
