= Aratiba =

Municipal district in Brazil

Coordinates: 27°24′S 52°19′W

- Municipality
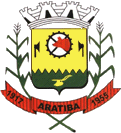
- Flag Coat of arms
- Interactive map of Aratiba
- Country: Brazil
- Time zone: UTC−3 (BRT)

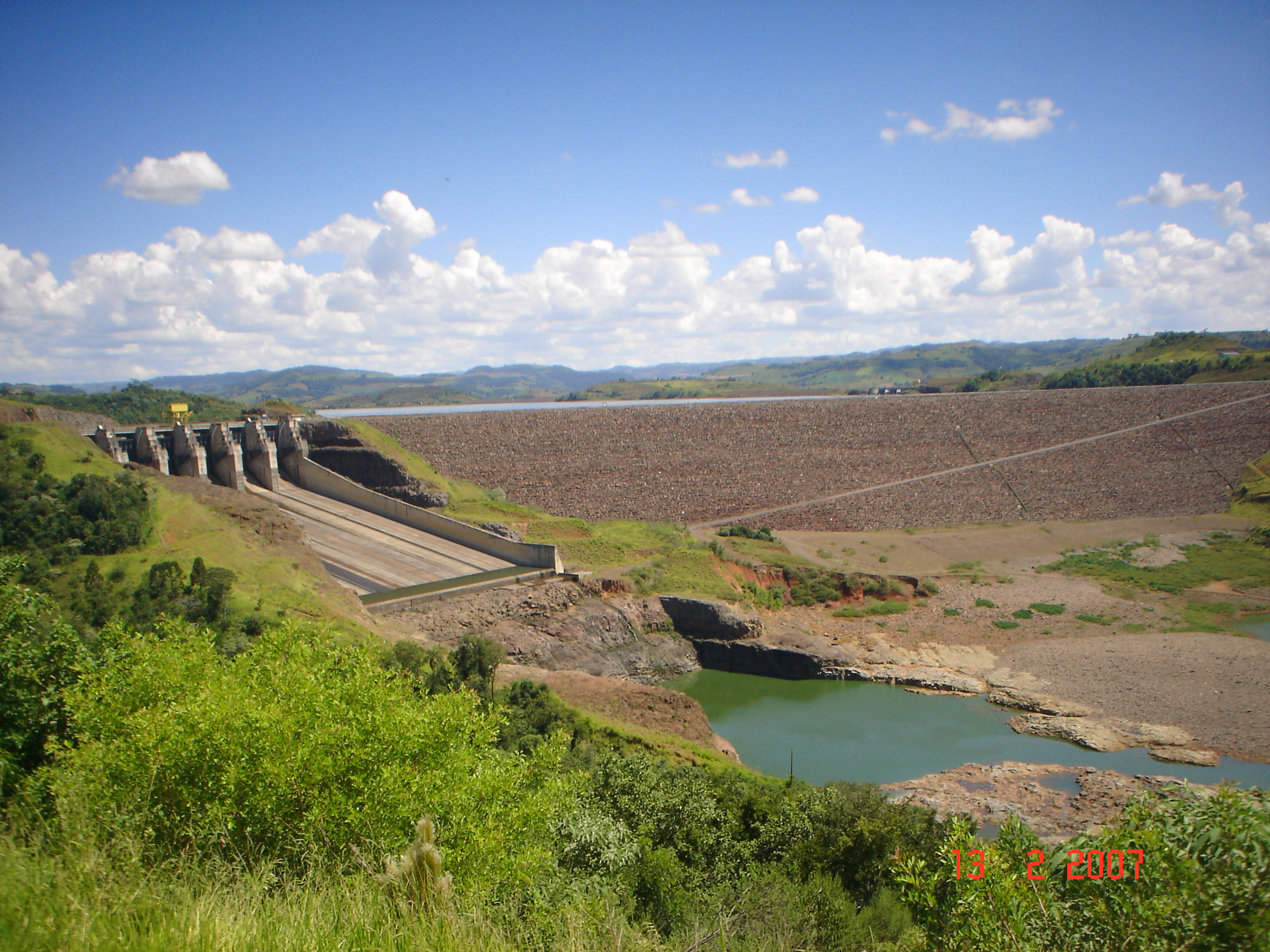

Aratiba (Portuguese: [a.ɾaˈt͡ʃi.bɐ]) is the 117° Municipal district created in the Brazilian state of Rio Grande do Sul.

== Geography ==
Aratiba's Municipal district is located in the north of Rio Grande do Sul's State, emblem with Santa Catarina to 420 km capital Porto Alegre, and to 35 km city of Erechim. As of 2020, the estimated population was 6,189.

== History ==
The areas colonization began in 1917 and in 1919, the community was named "Rio Novo". In 1924 it was elevated to the category of 7° district of Erechim. In 1944, the village Rio Novo was renamed Aratiba, which loosely translated means "flocks of parakeets". On 19 October 1953 the attempt to separate itself from Aratiba's District began, which was successful on June 5, 1955 through a plebiscite. The elevation for the Municipal district category occurred on 4 October 1955 through the Law n°2.710, signed by the governor of the Estado Ildo Meneghetti. Officially, the Municipal district was installed on 1 January 1956.

== See also ==
- List of municipalities in Rio Grande do Sul
