= Venâncio Aires =

Municipality of Rio Grande do Sul, Brazil

- Municipality
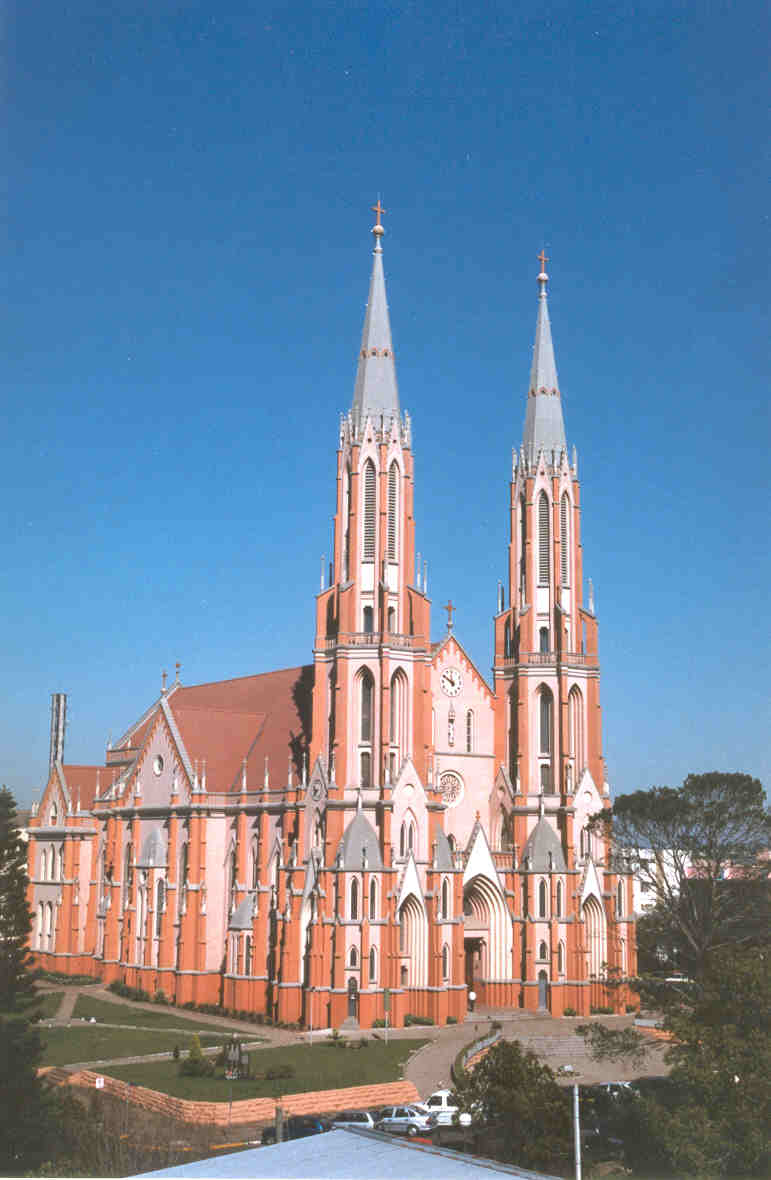
- Church of Saint Sebastian

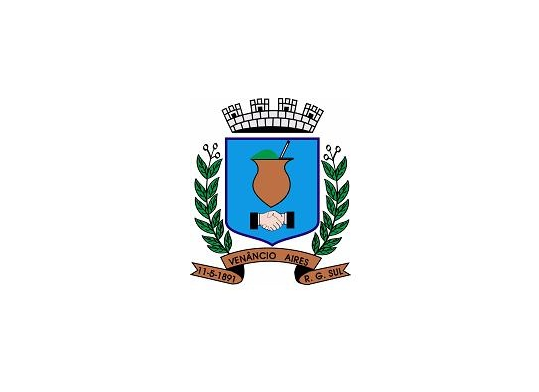
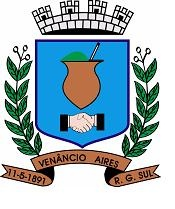
- Flag Coat of arms

- Location within Rio Grande do Sul

- Location in Brazil
- Coordinates: 29°36′S 52°11′W
- Country: Brazil
- Region: South
- State: Rio Grande do Sul

Government
  - Mayor: Jarbas Daniel da Rosa (2021-Present)

Population (2020)
  - Total: 71,973
- Time zone: UTC−3 (BRT)
- Website: venancioaires.rs.gov.br

Venâncio Aires is a city in the state of Rio Grande do Sul, Brazil. It is the capital of chimarrão, with approximately 72,000 inhabitants. The main industry is tobacco.

== See also ==
- Esporte Clube Guarani
