= São Leopoldo =

Municipality of Rio Grande do Sul, Brazil

- Municipality
- Municipality of São Leopoldo
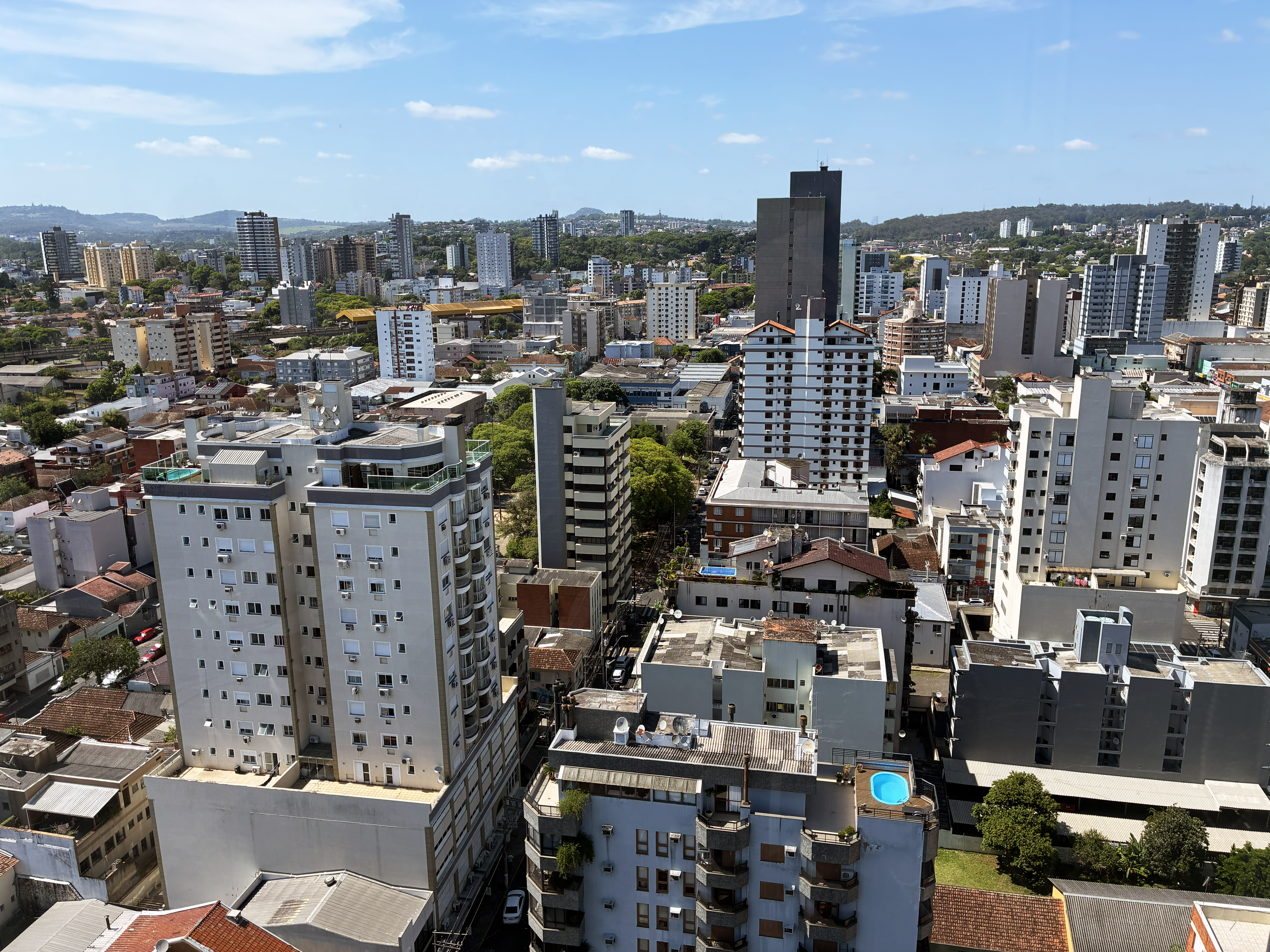
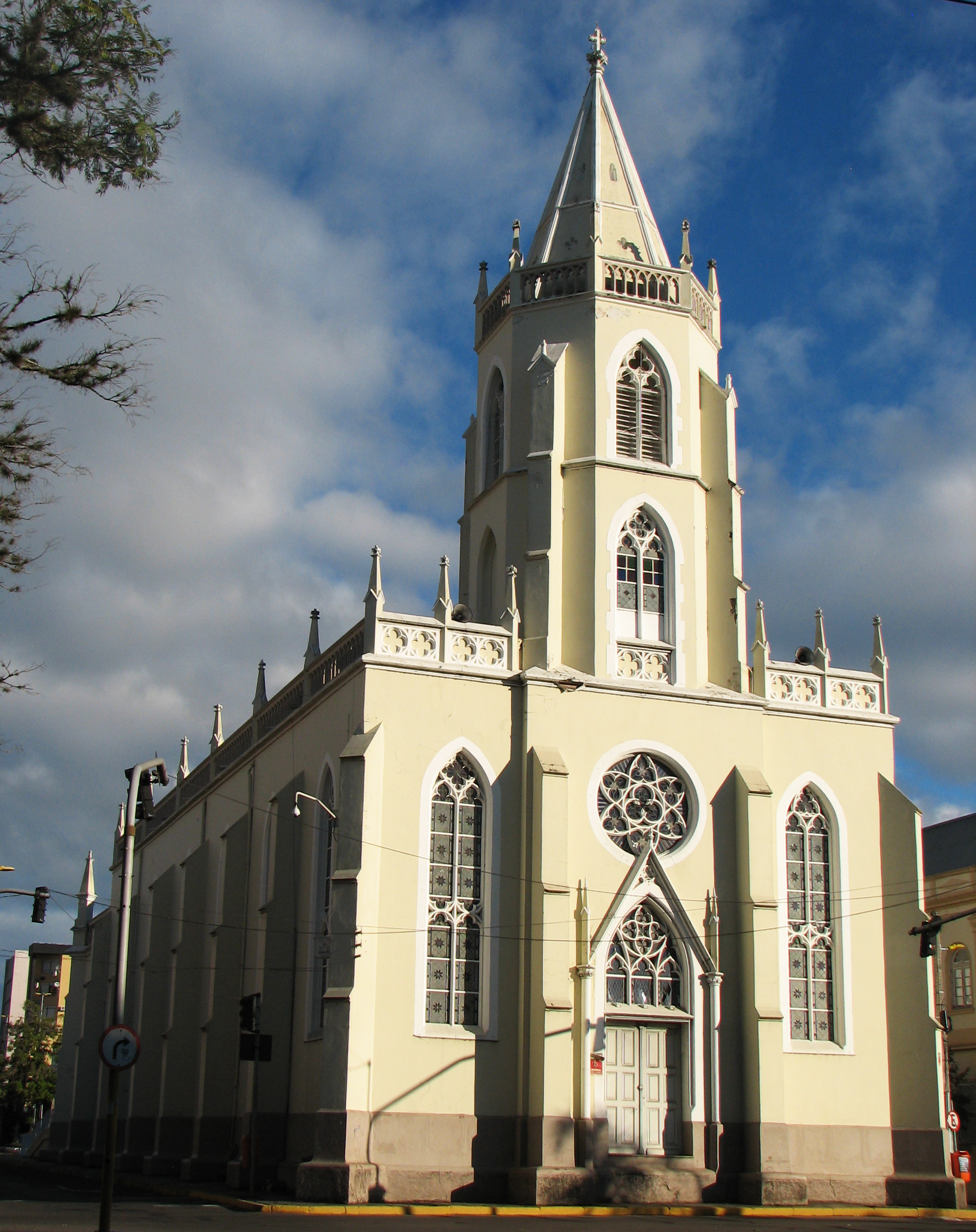
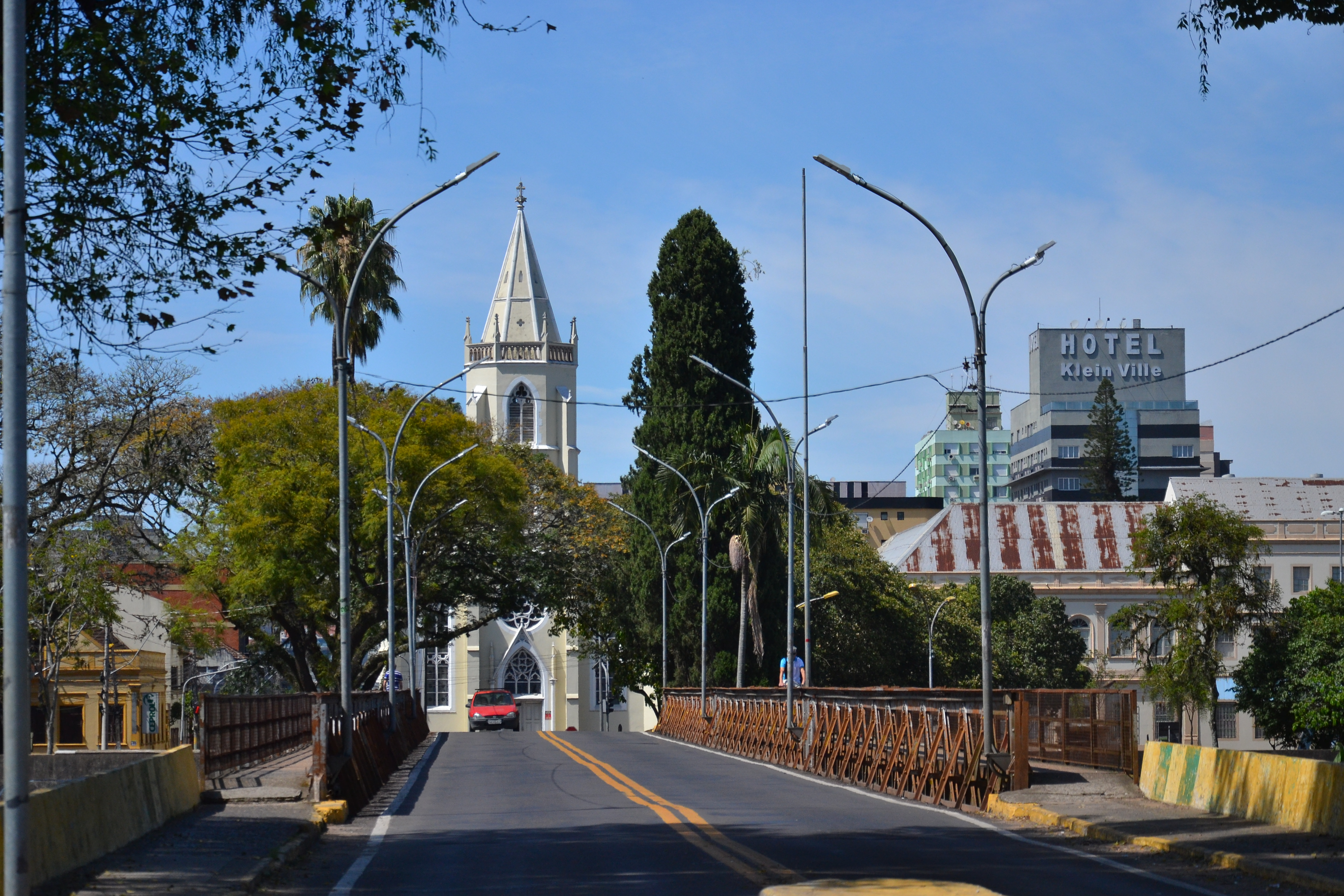
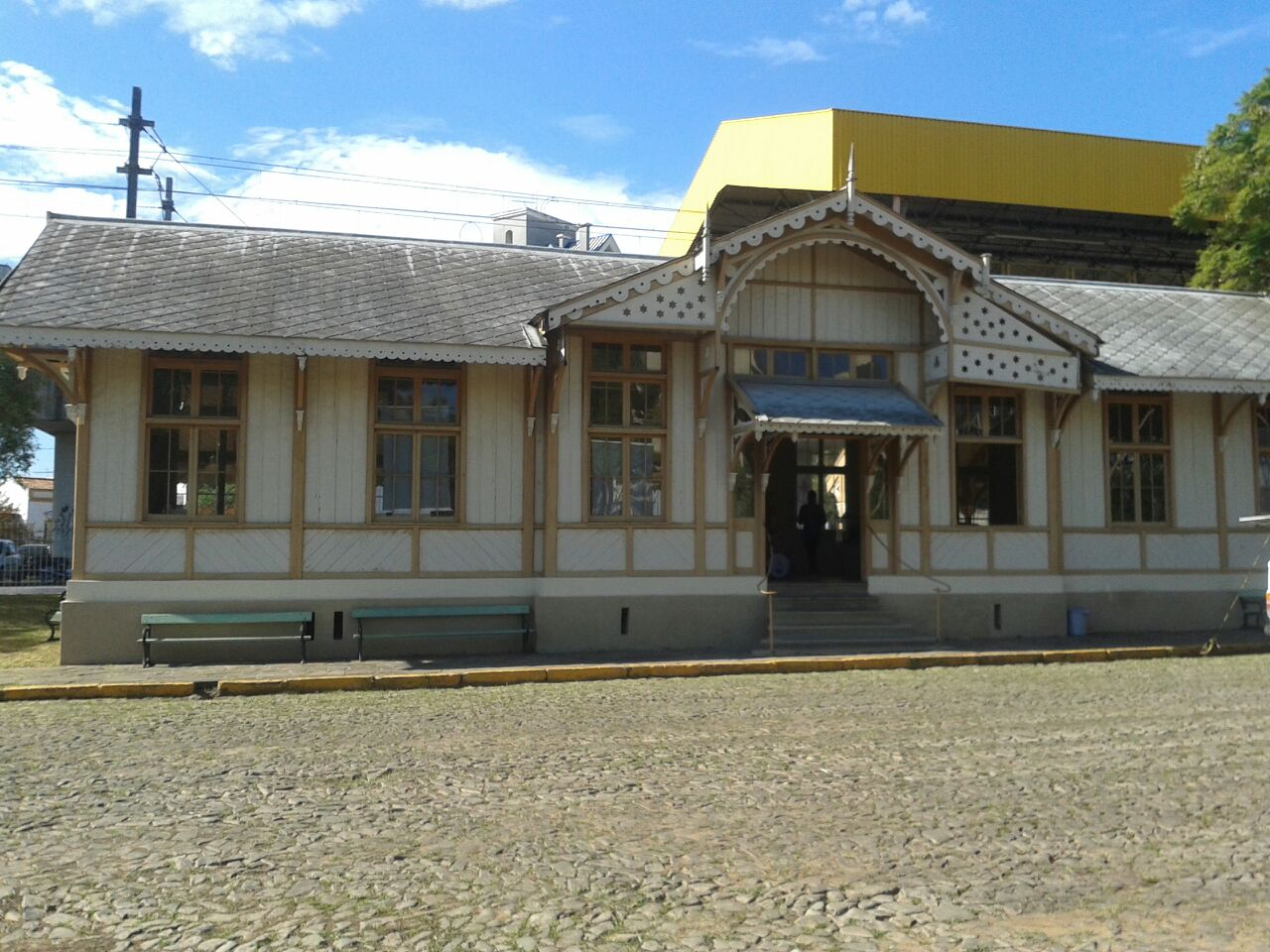
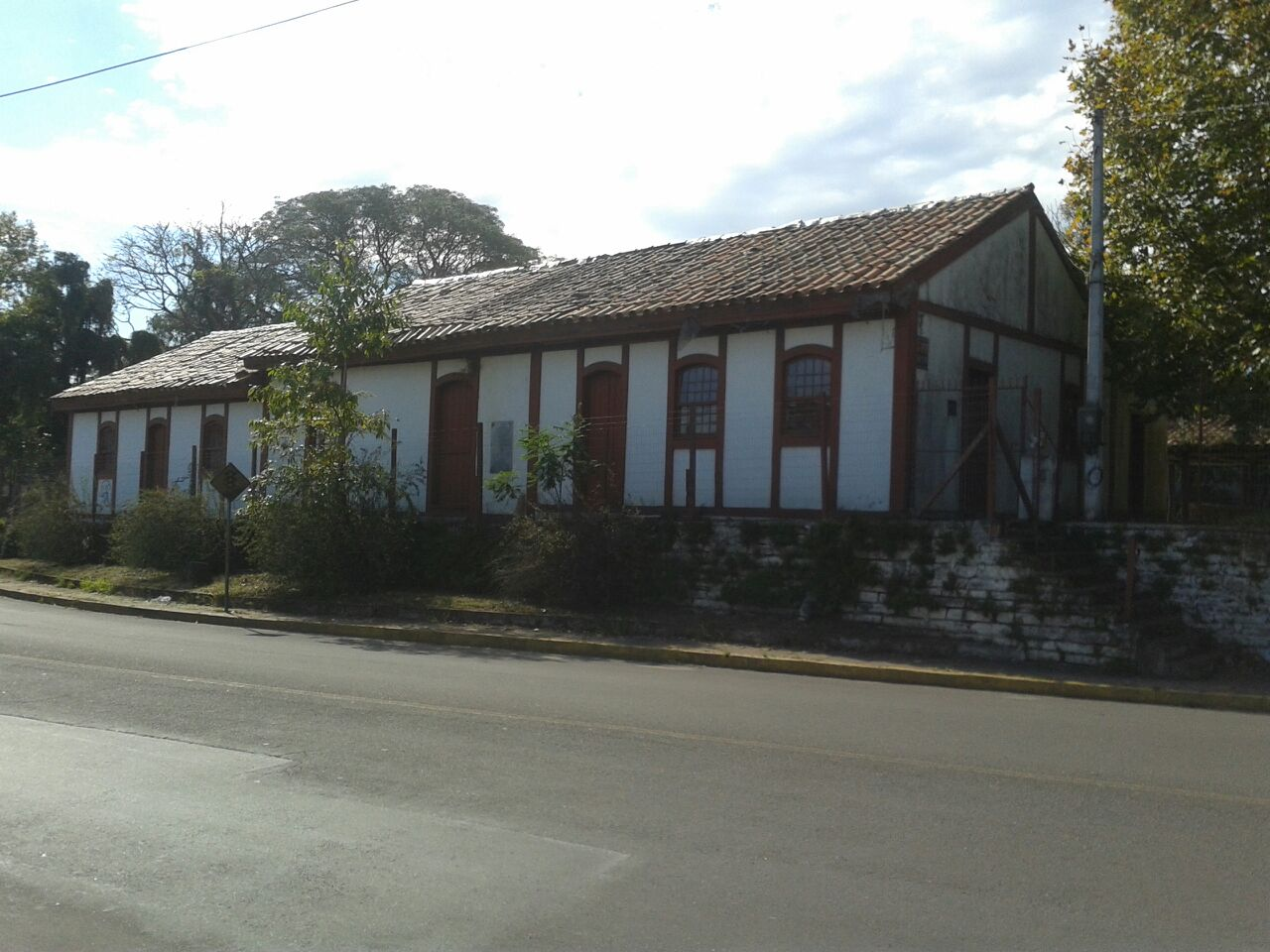

- Flag Coat of arms
- Nickname: The Giant of the Valley (O Gigante do Vale)
- Location in Rio Grande do Sul

- Location in Brazil
- Coordinates: 29°45′36″S 51°08′49″W
- Country: Brazil
- Region: South
- State: Rio Grande do Sul
- Founded: July 25, 1824
- Incorporated: April 1, 1846 (town)
- 1864 (city)

Government
  - Mayor: Heliomar Athaydes Franco (PL)

Area
  - Total: 102.313 km^{2} (39.503 sq mi)
- Elevation: 26 m (85 ft)

Population (2022 Brazilian census)
  - Total: 217,409
  - Estimate (2025): 225,737
  - Density: 2,124.94/km^{2} (5,503.57/sq mi)
- Demonym: capilé or leopoldense
- Time zone: UTC−3 (BRT)
- HDI (2010): 0.739 – high
- Website: saoleopoldo.rs.gov.br

São Leopoldo (Portuguese pronunciation: [sɐ̃w lewˈpowdu]) (Portuguese for Saint Leopold) is a Brazilian industrial city located in the south state of Rio Grande do Sul.

== Geography ==
It occupies a total area of 103.9 km^{2} (around 80 km^{2} urban area) at circa 30 km from the State Capital, Porto Alegre. The climate is sub-tropical, with temperatures varying from -2 °C minimum at Winter to more than 40 °C maximum during summer time. Summers are fairly dry.

== History ==
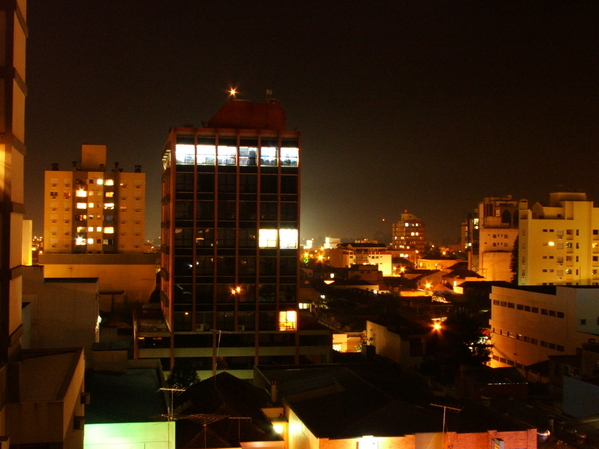
Buildings in São Leopoldo at night

Established on July 25, 1824, by German immigrants, São Leopoldo is considered the cradle of German culture in Brazil, that is to say, it is the first official city designed by the national Brazilian governor to start the German plan of immigration in the country. It had, in 2006, a population of approximately 210,000.

São Leopoldo is one of the 13 cities along the Rota Romântica ('Romantic Route'), a touristic scenic route that runs from the State Capital towards the Serra Gaúcha.

== Minority language ==
Riograndenser Hunsrückisch German is a regional language in South America like Pennsylvania Deitsch is in North America. They are also similar because of their origin in the Rhine region of southwest Germany. As a Brazilian variant of European Moselle Franconian, it is also spoken beyond the state of Rio Grande do Sul, where for almost two hundred years it has been historically centered and where most of its 2 to 3 millions speakers live (there are speakers in neighboring southern Brazilian states, as well as in Argentina, Paraguay and Uruguay).

There are many other municipalities with this bilingual profile throughout the state and the German language is experiencing a strong revival: in 2012 the state chamber of deputies voted unanimously in favor of recognizing the Hunsrückisch Germanic dialect of Rio Grande do Sul as an official historical intangible cultural heritage to be preserved.

== Economy ==
The municipality of São Leopoldo ranks among the top ten in Rio Grande do Sul in terms of Gross Domestic Product and boasts a diversified, globalized industrial base, alongside a significant commercial and service sector. Several global multinational leaders have operations in the city, such as the German companies Stihl, SAP, Ensinger, and Gedore, as well as the local firm Taurus. It is one of the 50 best cities in the country to live in. The city is also home to the largest IT hub in Rio Grande do Sul, which is affiliated with the University of Vale do Rio dos Sinos.

== Education ==
The area had a German school, Instituto Preteologico. The city is the headquarters of Unisinos University.

== See also ==
- List of municipalities in Rio Grande do Sul
- São Leopoldo Insurrection
