= Esporte Clube Pelotas =

Pelotas
- Full name: Esporte Clube Pelotas
- Nickname: Lobão (Big Wolf)
- Founded: October 11, 1908; 117 years ago
- Ground: Boca do Lobo
- Capacity: 18,000
- President: Luis Aleixo
- Head coach: Antônio Picoli
- League: Campeonato Gaúcho Série A2
- 2025: Gaúcho, 12th of 12 (relegated)
- Website: www.ecpelotas.com.br
Home colors	Away colors

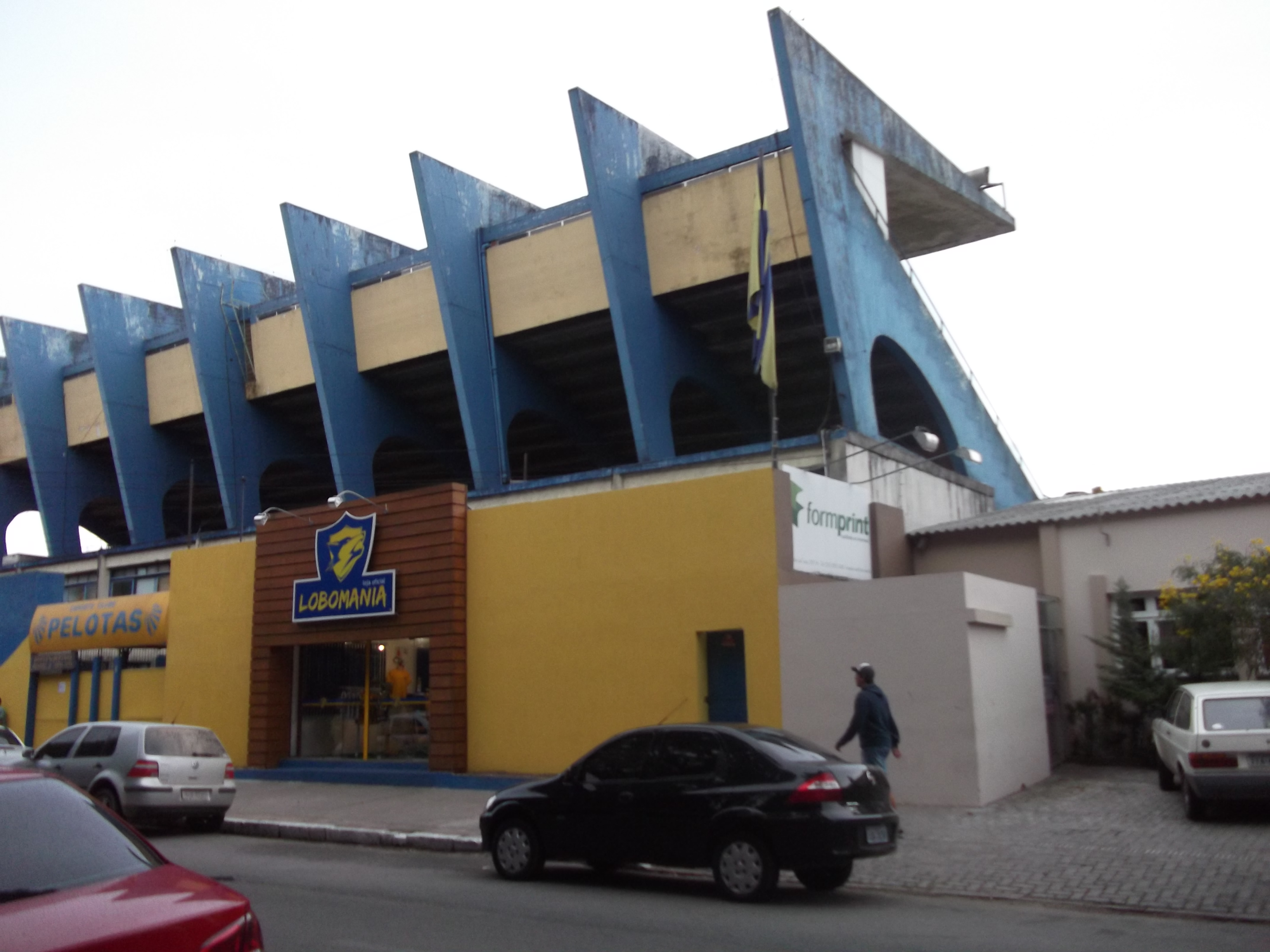
Estádio Boca do Lobo

Esporte Clube Pelotas, more commonly referred to as Pelotas, is a professional football club based in Pelotas, Rio Grande do Sul, Brazil. Founded in 1908, it plays in the Campeonato Gaúcho A2, the second level of Rio Grande do sul state league, holding home games at Estádio Boca do Lobo, with a 23,336-seat capacity.

The club competed several times in the Campeonato Brasileiro Série B and in the Campeonato Brasileiro Série C, and won the Campeonato Gaúcho in 1930. Esporte Clube Pelotas women's football team competed in the 2008 Copa do Brasil de Futebol Feminino.

== History ==
The club was founded on October 11, 1908, after two clubs from Pelotas, Club Sportivo Internacional and Football Club, merged. In 1930, Pelotas won the Campeonato Gaúcho, beating Grêmio in the final.

In 1983, Pelotas won the Campeonato Gaúcho Second Level. In 1988, Pelotas competed in the Campeonato Brasileiro Série B for the first time, but was eliminated in the first stage. In 1989, the club competed again in the Série B, being eliminated in the first stage again.

In 1995, 1996 and in 1998, Pelotas competed in the Campeonato Brasileiro Série C, being eliminated in the first stage in all three seasons. In 2003, the club competed again in the Série C, where they were eliminated by RS Futebol in the third stage of the competition. In the same year, Pelotas competed in the Copa do Brasil, being eliminated in the cup's first round, by Guarani.

In 2008, the club won the Copa FGF for the first time, after beating Cerâmica in the final, thus qualifying to the same season's Recopa Sul-Brasileira, and the following season's Campeonato Brasileiro Série D. The club was eliminated in the Recopa Sul-Brasileira in the semifinals 2–0, by Atlético Sorocaba.

== Honours ==
=== Official tournaments ===
State
Competitions	Titles	Seasons
Campeonato Gaúcho	1	1930
Copa FGF	2^{s}	2008, 2019
Recopa Gaúcha	2	2014, 2020
Super Copa Gaúcha	1^{s}	2013
Campeonato Gaúcho Série A2	2	1983, 2018

- record
- ^{s} shared record

=== Others tournaments ===
==== State ====
- Copa Sul-Fronteira (1): 2013
- Campeonato do Interior Gaúcho (8): 1930, 1932, 1945, 1951, 1956, 1960, 1988, 1992

==== State Regional ====
- Campeonato Gaúcho-Região Litoral (9): 1930, 1932, 1939, 1944, 1945, 1951, 1956, 1958, 1960

==== City ====
- Campeonato Citadino de Pelotas (22): 1912, 1913, 1915, 1916, 1925, 1928, 1930, 1932, 1933, 1939, 1944, 1945, 1951, 1956, 1957, 1958, 1960, 1965, 1971, 1976, 1981, 1996
- Torneio Início de Pelotas (9): 1927, 1928, 1935, 1936, 1944, 1949, 1951, 1952, 1996
- Taça Cidade de Pelotas (3): 1924, 1973, 1976

=== Runners-up ===
- Campeonato Gaúcho (5): 1932, 1945, 1951, 1956, 1960
- Copa FGF (1): 2015
- Campeonato Gaúcho Série A2 (3): 2009, 2016, 2024

=== Women's Football ===
- Campeonato Gaúcho de Futebol Feminino (1): 2008

== Women's football team ==
Esporte Clube Pelotas women's football team competed in the 2008 Copa do Brasil de Futebol Feminino, but was eliminated in the first round by Kindermann, of Caçador, Santa Catarina. In the first leg, the club was beaten 5–0, then in the second leg the club was defeated again, 3–0.

== Rivals ==
Pelotas's rivals are Brasil de Pelotas and Farroupilha. The first derby is known as Bra-Pel, while the second derby is known as Far-Pel.

== Stadium ==
The club usually plays its home games at Estádio Boca do Lobo, which is a stadium located in Pelotas, and it has a maximum capacity of 23,336 people.

== Current squad ==
Note: Flags indicate national team as defined under FIFA eligibility rules; some limited exceptions apply. Players may hold more than one non-FIFA nationality.

No.	Pos.	Nation	Player
1	GK	BRA	Bruno Hepp
2	DF	BRA	Jefferson Sandes
3	DF	BRA	Stevys
6	DF	BRA	Elbér
8	MF	BRA	Ademir
11	FW	BRA	Gilian

No.	Pos.	Nation	Player
12	GK	BRA	Igor Rayan
13	DF	BRA	Anderson Luis
14	MF	BRA	Arthur
15	DF	BRA	Gere Itaqui
25	FW	BRA	Feliphe
