= Esporte Clube São José =

Brazilian association football club based in Porto Alegre, Rio Grande do Sul, Brazil

São José
- Full name: Esporte Clube São José
- Nicknames: Zequinha (Little Zeca); O Mais Simpático do Sul (The Most Friendly of the South); Zecavirus
- Founded: 24 May 1913; 113 years ago
- Ground: Passo D'Areia
- Capacity: 13,000
- President: Flávio Abreu
- Head coach: Thiago Gomes
- League: Campeonato Brasileiro Série D Campeonato Gaúcho
- 2025 2025: Série D, 19th of 64; Gaúcho, 10th of 12
- Website: saojosefutebol.com.br
Home colors	Away colors	Third colors

Esporte Clube São José, commonly referred to as São José, is a Brazilian professional club based in Porto Alegre, Rio Grande do Sul founded on 24 May 1913. It competes in the Campeonato Brasileiro Série D, the fourth tier of Brazilian football, as well as in the Campeonato Gaúcho, the top flight of the Rio Grande do Sul state football league.

== History ==
São José was founded in 1913, when, among conversations and football games during class breaks at São José High School, a group of students decided to leave the school fields to face big teams in the professional fields. With the encouragement of Brother Constantino José, an admirer of Italian football and intellectual mentor of the venture, six students formed the Esporte Clube São José, which from its birth showed the will to seek new challenges. Léo de la Rue, one of the founders, inaugurated the presidents' gallery, in a management where each player bought his own uniform and contributed with a monthly fee of $500 to kick-start this great project. After several changes of headquarters, in 1939 the club found its home in a piece of land in the North Zone of Porto Alegre.

On Sunday, 5 June 1927, in the morning, São José boarded the hydroplane Dornier Do J Wal “Atlantico” of Varig, for a game away from Porto Alegre. This was the first time in the whole world, that a football team traveled by plane to play a match. The feat, recognized by FIFA in 1992, is recorded in the entity's archives. The flight, which lasted two and a half hours, went from the state capital to Pelotas, about 260 km to the south, where São José played a friendly match against Esporte Clube Pelotas.

The club changed its headquarters several times, until in 1939 the land of the current stadium was purchased. The Passo D'Areia Stadium was inaugurated on 24 May 1940. In its opening, São José received Grêmio, but lost on the occasion by the score of 3x2. Currently, the stadium no longer has any bleachers from the time, which were made of wood. In the place there are 3 stands, two on the sides and one behind the goal, all fully covered, which together hold about 13,000 spectators.

In 1998, in a marketing move, São José hired Careca, former Brazil National team, São Paulo and Napoli. He played a few matches on the Campeonato Gaúcho and finished his career there.

In 2010 São José achieved its best campaign in the State Championship, with fourth place, winning a place in the Campeonato Brasileiro Série D, and also was the top scorer in the 2010 Gauchão. São José won a slot to compete in its first Copa do Brasil, in 2011.

In 2018, São José was promoted to the Campeonato Brasileiro Série C, after beating Linense by 2x0 in the Passo D'areia at the 2018 Campeonato Brasileiro Série D quarter-finals. The team was eliminated from the Série D playoffs against Ferroviário-CE at the semi-finals. The team has competed in the Série C since then and it is part of the select list of Brazilian clubs that have never been relegated by any of the national divisions of the Brasileirão.

== Stadium ==
São José's stadium is the Estádio Passo D'Areia, built in 1940 and renovated in 2011 with the implantation of artificial turf (with FIFA approval). The stadium has a maximum capacity of 13,000 people.

== Honours ==
=== Official tournaments ===
State
Competitions	Titles	Seasons
Copa FGF	2^{s}	2017, 2024
Recopa Gaúcha	1	2018
Super Copa Gaúcha	1^{s}	2015
Copa Governador do Estado	1	1971
Campeonato Gaúcho Série A2	2	1963, 1981

- record
- ^{s} shared record

=== Others tournaments ===
==== State ====
- Copa Metropolitana (1): 2016
- Copa Sul-Fronteira (1): 2015
- Campeonato do Interior Gaúcho (2): 2016, 2018

=== Runners-up ===
- Copa FGF (4): 2013, 2019, 2020, 2023
- Recopa Gaúcha (1): 2025
- Campeonato Gaúcho Série A2 (1): 1996
