= Paulo =

- Gender: male

Origin
- Region of origin: Portugal, Brazil

Other names
- Related names: Paul, Pavel, Paweł, Pavol, Paolo, Pablo

Paulo is a Portuguese masculine given name equivalent to the English name Paul. Notable people with the name include:

- Paulo Jr., Brazilian bassist
- Paulo Jr. (footballer), Brazilian footballer
- Paulo Almeida, Brazilian footballer
- Paulo André Cren Benini (born 1983), Brazilian football defender
- Paulo Angeles (born 1997), Filipino actor, singer and dancer
- Paulo Avelino (born 1988), Filipino actor and film actor
- Paulo Bilynskyj (born 1987), Brazilian politician
- Paulo de Carvalho (born 1947), Portuguese singer-songwriter and actor
- Paulo Coelho (born 1947), Brazilian lyricist and novelist
- Paulo Diebold (1925–1983), Brazilian rower
- Paulo Dybala (born 1993), Argentine professional footballer also called "La Joya"
- Paulo Fernando Craveiro, Brazilian author
- Paulo César Martin (1962–2026), Brazilian journalist and radio host
- Paulo Freire (1921–1997), Brazilian educator and philosopher
- Paulo R. Holvorcem, Brazilian amateur astronomer, a prolific discoverer of asteroids
- Paulo Jorge (disambiguation), several people
- Paulo Kanoa (1802–1885), Governor of Kauaʻi
- Paulo P. Kanoa (1832–1895), Governor of Kauaʻi
- Paulo Machado (disambiguation), several people
- Paulo Miklos (born 1959), Brazilian multi-instrumentalist, musician and actor
- Paulo Muacho (born 1990), Portuguese politician
- Paulo Antonio de Oliveira (born 1982), Brazilian football striker
- Paulo Oppliger (born 1971), Chilean alpine skier
- Paulo Orlando (born 1985), Brazil-born Major League Baseball player
- Paulo Ribenboim (born 1928), Brazil-born mathematician who specializes in number theory
- Paulo Ribeiro (disambiguation), several people
- Paulo Rogério da Silva (born 1970), also known as Gero Camilo, Brazilian actor, director, poet and musician
- Paulo Santos (disambiguation), several people
- Paulo Sousa (disambiguation), several people

== Fictional characters ==
- Paulo (Lost), in the television series Lost
- Paulo Bardosa, in the television series Footballers' Wives
- Paulo, from Pokémon Masters EX

== See also ==
- Paulo (surname)
- São Paulo (disambiguation)
- Paul O (born 1967), Nigerian event promoter and music director executive
- An alternative name used in Australia for wine made from the Palomino grape
- Paolo
- Paulão
- Paulinho
- João Paulo
