= TV Jornal do Brasil =

- Type: Defunct broadcasting television network
- Branding: TV JB
- Country: Brazil
- Availability: Brazil
- Headquarters: Rio de Janeiro, RJ; São Paulo, SP
- Broadcast area: Brazil
- Owner: Companhia Brasileira de Multimídia
- Launch date: April 17, 2007; 19 years ago
- Dissolved: September 17, 2007; 18 years ago

TV Jornal do Brasil (better known as TV JB) was a Brazilian television network founded in Rio de Janeiro on April 17, 2007, by businessman Nelson Tanure, owner of Companhia Brasileira de Multimídia (CBM), initially broadcast through a partnership with Flávio Martinez of CNT. The partnership lasted until September 5, when, by court decision, the network had its signal cut due to lack of payment, combined with an internal crisis. On September 10, it returned to air through Rede Brasil, which lasted just one week. The channel closed on September 17, 2007.

Initially, TV JB broadcast six hours a day of its own production, from 6pm to midnight. The channel had headquarters in Rio de Janeiro, São Paulo (at Gugu Produções) and in Brasília (at the news branch of Grupo CBM). The name was inspired by the newspaper of the same name, owned by the same group.

== History ==
Jornal do Brasil had been aiming to establish a television station since the 1950s. This interest first emerged during Juscelino Kubitschek’s term as president (1956–1961). Although the process was well underway, the Federal Government ultimately did not grant the license. In 1961, another attempt, with Jânio Quadros as president, also fell through due to his resignation from office that same year. His vice president and successor, João Goulart, facilitated discussions, but without success. In 1973, during the administration of Emílio Médici, under the military dictatorship, the station was granted VHF Channel 9 (formerly occupied by TV Continental) in the then-state of Guanabara, which was subsequently transferred to Niterói, a neighboring city and then the capital of the state of Rio de Janeiro, on the grounds that a TV station was needed there.

In 1974, at the beginning of Ernesto Geisel’s term, the newspaper secured a license for Channel 9 in the city of São Paulo with the intention of forming a national network, a plan that ultimately failed. The then-CEO of Jornal do Brasil, Nacimento Brito, stated that the station faced a boycott regarding corporate sponsorship and federal advertising funds—the newspaper had been critical of the government's statist economic policies. In 1978, with the deadline for launching the network approaching, the two channels allocated to the newspaper were returned to the federal government.

In 1985, in another attempt to create a network, Jornal do Brasil, together with João Havelange—then president of the International Federation of Association Football (FIFA)—and with the support of executives from the Mexican media conglomerate Televisa, acquired the shares held by TV host Silvio Santos in the radio and television broadcasting group owned by businessman Paulo Machado de Carvalho. Among them were the Record AM and FM radio stations in São Paulo, TV Record in São Paulo and Rio de Janeiro, TV Rio Preto and TV Imperador. However, shortly thereafter, control of the networks returned to the Machado de Carvalho family (with the exception of Record in Rio, which went to Guilherme Stoliar, Silvio Santos's nephew).

In August 2006, CNT owner Flávio Martinez leased all programming rights for his stations to CBM president Nelson Tanure for R$3 million per month under a five-year renewable contract. In September, CBM took over the channel's programming and commercial management, though with no apparent changes. In October, the new managers leased the premises of the Casablanca production company to use as the new station's headquarters. In November, Boris Casoy and Clodovil Hernandes were hired. In December, CNT broadcast the FIFA Club World Cup under the CNT/JB brand. In January 2007, the new management decided against leasing the Casablanca venue and instead opted to lease the building owned by Gugu Produções, Gugu Liberato's production company, in Barueri. CNT Jornal begins to be produced on a temporary basis at the studios of the Central Nacional de Televisão in Rio de Janeiro (produced in the same studio as Jornal do Meio Dia, which at the time was broadcast only in Rio de Janeiro). In February, the Rio de Janeiro Samba School Parade (Accesso A) is broadcast, still under the CNT brand. In March, all programs produced by CNT are discontinued, including sports and news programs such as CNT Jornal.

=== Launch ===
On Tuesday, April 17 (originally scheduled for the previous Tuesday, April 10), at 6pm on, the station opens (between midnight and 6pm, the time was occupied by independent productions and infomercials). In a report published in Jornal do Brasil on the same day, it is highlighted that the channel's idea was to "get away from the easy audience and low-level programming - so in vogue on over-the-air channels", through "critical journalism and programs with the refinement of Pay TV". The programthat marked the beginning of the station's activities was a program aimed at teenagers entitled Na Rua. At 10pm, Telejornal do Brasil premiered. At the premiere of the programming, the network's main transmitter in São Paulo, with 40 kW, caught fire and TV JB is forced to debut with a 10 kW backup transmitter. The enthusiasm provoked by the launch of the channel was such that Nelson Tanure, president of the CBM group, stated in a report published in Jornal do Brasil that the new broadcaster would easily be "the third largest television network in Brazil" with an expected affiliation of 66 stations, hoping to achieve the goal by 2012. The network was also one of the possible affiliations TV Pampa would follow after May 31, when its contract with Record expired.

In April of the same year, the Portuguese-Brazilian series Segredo premiered, originally shown by RTP and presented in a soap opera format by TV JB under the name Coração Navegador. The decision was made to Brazilianize the series with another title, a new opening with the song "Vira Virou", by Kleiton & Kledir and the dubbing of the Portuguese actors' lines. The plot was recorded in Porto Alegre.

=== Financial problems, move to Rede Brasil and shutdown ===
In May, the first complaints from employees about the station's financial situation occurred. On May 25, a team from TV JB in Rio de Janeiro was robbed in Complexo do Alemão. In May, the program Manhã Mulher debuted, presented daily between 10am and 12pm. In June, it was reported that the channel's audience was just 0.1 point (known in local terminology as the "traço", literally "dash") on IBOPE in São Paulo, justified by its poor signal. In the same month, Coração Navegador stopped being shown without explanation, so its ending was not presented. 15 of the 60 episodes were shown, later being repeated before taken off the air. TV JB suspends payments for both channel leasing and studio rental. On June 27, the channel inaugurates a new transmitter in Rio de Janeiro. In July, Clodovil Hernandes was fired from the network after disagreements with the production of his program, without the right to a termination fine.

In August, TV JB's programming schedule changes constantly due to the crisis. Despite the attempt at renegotiation, Flávio Martinez gives up on the deal and asks the court to break the contract. On September 3, TV JB announced with great excitement the hiring of Sérgio Mallandro for a program on Sunday afternoons, but it never debuted. In September, the São Paulo court, in an injunction favorable to the CNT, authorized it to cut the signal, carried out on the 6th. To cover the space left, reruns of its own programs, originally produced in the 1990s, were shown. On the same day, TV JB returned to air on the newly created Rede Brasil. The official launch of the new partnership took place on September 10. However, after a week on the air, CBM decided to end its television project, claiming that its end was linked to "the technical quality of the transmission network [CNT] which did not serve commercial customers or TVJB's audience". With the closure, 200 employees were laid off. In the same month, the group requested a survey of all TV quotes for sale in the period to try to relaunch the channel. The short-lived TV JB was called "Mico do Ano" (Mistake of the Year) in an article published in the newspaper O Globo, at the end of 2007.

== Programs ==
From its launch until its closure, TV JB produced and aired the following programs:

- Telejornal do Brasil - presented by Boris Casoy, brought the latest information of the day with analysis and enlightening interviews. It was shown throughout the network's existence. It was also broadcast on a cable channel belonging to TV Alphaville.
- Repórter JB - documentary and report program focused on the country's paradisiacal beauty.
- Nei e Nani - variety program that focused on topics such as aesthetics, cooking, curiosities, news and sport. It was presented by Ney Gonçalves Dias and Nani Venâncio, the program was shown on Rede Brasil.
- Manhã Mulher – Brazilian television program broadcast by TVJB, shown from Monday to Friday from 10:00 am to 12:00 pm with the presentation of Ney Gonçalves Dias and Nani Venâncio. It was a women's program that focused on topics such as aesthetics, cooking, news and fashion.
- Bagatela – program that was broadcast at 12pm for a few weeks, and which held auctions in reverse, in which the person who gave the lowest single bid won.
- Verso & Reverso - Talk show with Augusto Nunes, which covered current affairs and success stories.
- Caderno de Empregos - interview program presented by Bruna Calmon, gave tips on how to prepare a CV, how to behave in interviews and what the job market is like.
- Por Excelência - Talk show presented by Clodovil Hernandes on Sunday nights.
- Magnavita - interview program, tourism, glamor and with people from high society, led by Claudio Magnavita.
- Planeta Turismo - revealed the greatest curiosities of the country's environmental beauty.
- + Pop - music video slot of the network.
- Sinfonia Fina - musical program with a presentation by Anélis Assumpção. He was dedicated to both classical and popular music.
- Café & MPB - program that interviewed beginning or established artists of Brazilian Popular Music.
- JB Stage – program that showed varied shows.
- Loucos por Bola, presented by Alexandre Araújo, Smigol and Lopes.
- On the Street – Program aimed at young audiences. Main guests included varied bands and artists.
