= TV Pampa Porto Alegre =

TV Pampa Porto Alegre (ZYP 102)
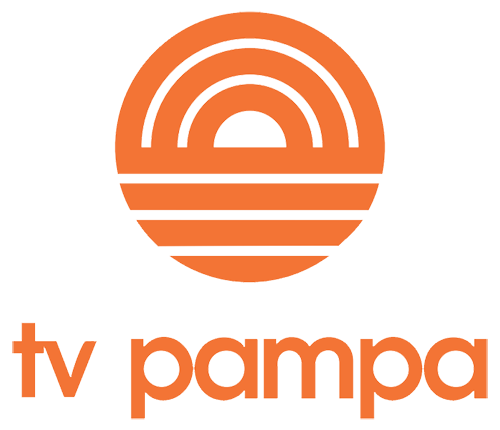
- Porto Alegre, Rio Grande do Sul; Brazil
- Channels: Digital: 26 (UHF); Virtual: 4

Programming
- Affiliations: RedeTV!

Ownership
- Owner: Rede Pampa de Comunicação; (Empresa Portoalegrense de Comunicação Ltda.)

History
- First air date: July 14, 1980; 46 years ago
- Former channel numbers: Analog: 4 (VHF, 1980–2018)
- Former affiliations: Independent (1980-1983; 1992); Rede Manchete (1983-1992; 1992-1997); Rede Record (1997-2002; 2003-2007)

Technical information
- Licensing authority: ANATEL
- ERP: 8 kW
- Transmitter coordinates: 30°4′51″S 51°10′59.5″W

Links
- Public license information: Profile
- Website: tvpampa.com.br

TV Pampa Porto Alegre (channel 4) is a RedeTV!-affiliated television station licensed to Porto Alegre, capital of the Brazilian state of Rio Grande do Sul. It is one of the four stations that make up Rede Pampa and its flagship, producing programs that are seen statewide. Its studios are located in the Santa Tereza neighborhood, next to the Rede Pampa de Comunicação holding, and its transmitting antenna is atop Morro da Polícia.

== History ==
TV Pampa was founded on July 14, 1980 by Otávio Dumit Gadret, owner of the then-Rede Riograndense de Emissoras. In its early years, it was an independent station, like TV Guaíba, founded a year earlier by Breno Caldas. Its local programming at the time included children's shows featuring Tampinha the clown, which occupied most of the daytime schedule. In the mornings, it aired Trem da Alegria, then Carrossel in the afternoons and Tampinlândia on weekends. At 7pm, the station aired Sessão Bangue-Bangue, with US Western series such as James West, Bonanza, The Big Valley, Chaparral and Laredo. At primetime, it aired Sessão das Nove, with movies introduced by presenter Rosa Helena Horst. The station's news department produced Panorama, with two daily editions, in the morning and late at night. On Saturday mornings, a cooking show aired, presented by the sister of the owner, Mirza Gadret. On Sundays, there was a cooking show with Abigail Blattner. While nominally independent, TV Pampa received imported series by means of a partnership with TV Record (from São Paulo).

Unlike TV Guaíba, TV Pampa did not maintain its local programming for a long time. In May 1983, with no conditions to continue its quality line of local programming, it signed an agreement with Oscar Sigelmann, vice-president of Grupo Bloch, to carry Rede Manchete's programming, becoming its first affiliate. Networked programming produced from Rio de Janeiro appeared on the network's launch day, June 5, 1983.

In late 1984, Pampa tried to heat up its competition with RBS TV and TV Guaíba, which was entering bankruptcy, by signing some of the key names of those stations, who had left Companhia Jornalística Caldas Júnior for lack of payments. Commercial director Enio Berwanger brought Tânia Carvalho, who had left Guaíba Feminina, and Balala Campos, former presenter of the local slot of Globo's TV Mulher, to create a female-oriented interview program at lunchtime. Lauro Quadros gained a segment at night, before Jornal da Manchete. When Lauro was hired by RBS TV, Edegar Schmidt took his place. Rogério Mendelski and Adroaldo Streck also had their commentary programs in prime time, right after Jornal da Manchete, delaying the programming sequence by twenty minutes.

In 1986, with inflation artificially frozen in the early months of Plano Cruzado, the local advertising market heated up, causing Pampa to invest even higher. Claudia Nocchi and Flavio Porcelo, coming from Jornal da RBS, became the presenters of Jornal Meridional, sponsored by Banco Meridional and airing late at night. It only lasted one year, due to criticism made to the state government following a teachers' strike, which led to the removal of its sponsorship.

Between 1987 and 1992, TV Pampa created several stations inland, the first of which being TV Pampa Sul in Pelotas and TV Pampa Centro in Cachoeiro, both created in 1987. The latter of the two was subsequently sold off, renamed TV Cachoeiro and is now an affiliate of the Adventist network Novo Tempo. This was followed by TV Pampa Norte in 1988, in Carazinho (Passo Fundo), and lastly TV Pampa Santa Maria in 1992, which later took on the name TV Pampa Centro following TV Cachoeiro's sale.

When Manchete was sold to IBF following a crisis the network faced in 1992, TV Pampa Porto Alegre became independent again, with music videos and some local programs. However, dissatisfied by the low ratings, it resumed its affiliation with Rede Manchete after a few months, when the network returned to be under Grupo Bloch's hands. During this time, the Porto Alegre station was a Manchete affiliate, while the stations inland were SBT affiliates.

The partnership with Rede Manchete was broken in 1997, when, in December of that year, it became an affiliate of the Record network, even airing its overnight UCKG programming.

On January 1, 2003, TV Pampa broke with Record and signed up to RedeTV!, with which it had signed a contract weeks before (on December 12, 2002). The agreement only lasted three months, as, according to the local press, there was a default from RedeTV! TV Pampa was not satisfied with its results, since the good ratings obtained in some networked programming was not reflected in the sale of airtime. Also, vice-president Paulo Sérgio Pinto noted that many viewers were unhappy about the loss of their favorite programs after the affiliation switch. TV Pampa returned to Rede Record on April 3, three months after its experience with RedeTV!.

However, in later years, relations between TV Pampa and Record deteriorated, as the station wanted to keep a local schedule that wasn't compatible with the network's standards. Grupo Record even made an offer to acquire the station and its three inland sisters, as well as newspaper O Sul, however its owner, Otávio Dumit Gadret, refused the offer. On February 22, 2007, Grupo Record acquired Sistema Guaíba-Correio do Povo, which included TV Guaíba, thus becoming a Record owned-and-operated station. This meant that TV Pampa did not renew its contract with the network, and had to find a new network. On June 21, a new contract with RedeTV! was signed, and from July 1, TV Pampa resumed carrying the network's programming, while Record migrated to its new O&O on channel 2, now named TV Record Rio Grande do Sul.

With the end of channel 2's independent programming, several of its productions migrated to TV Pampa, such as Programa Rosaura Fraga (renamed Pampa Bom Dia), Dois Toques, Guerrilheiros da Notícia, Clovis Duarte's Câmera Dois (which was split in two: Programa Clovis Duarte, at 6pm, and Câmera Pampa, at 11:30pm), and Zoom, which had migrated even before the new schedule began. New programs also joined the line-up.

In November 2007, TV Pampa won a 1997 lawsuit, being presented the right to use the "TV Manchete" brand. The decision from the Federal Justice came with a surprise to the station, as the network was shut down eight years earlier. Station vice-president Paulo Sérgio Pinto told to the press as he was unaware of what would be done with the brand and that the decision could not be taken at the short term.

In 2016, facing a crisis and poor management, it cancelled Studio Pampa and Pampa Meio Dia.

== Technical information ==
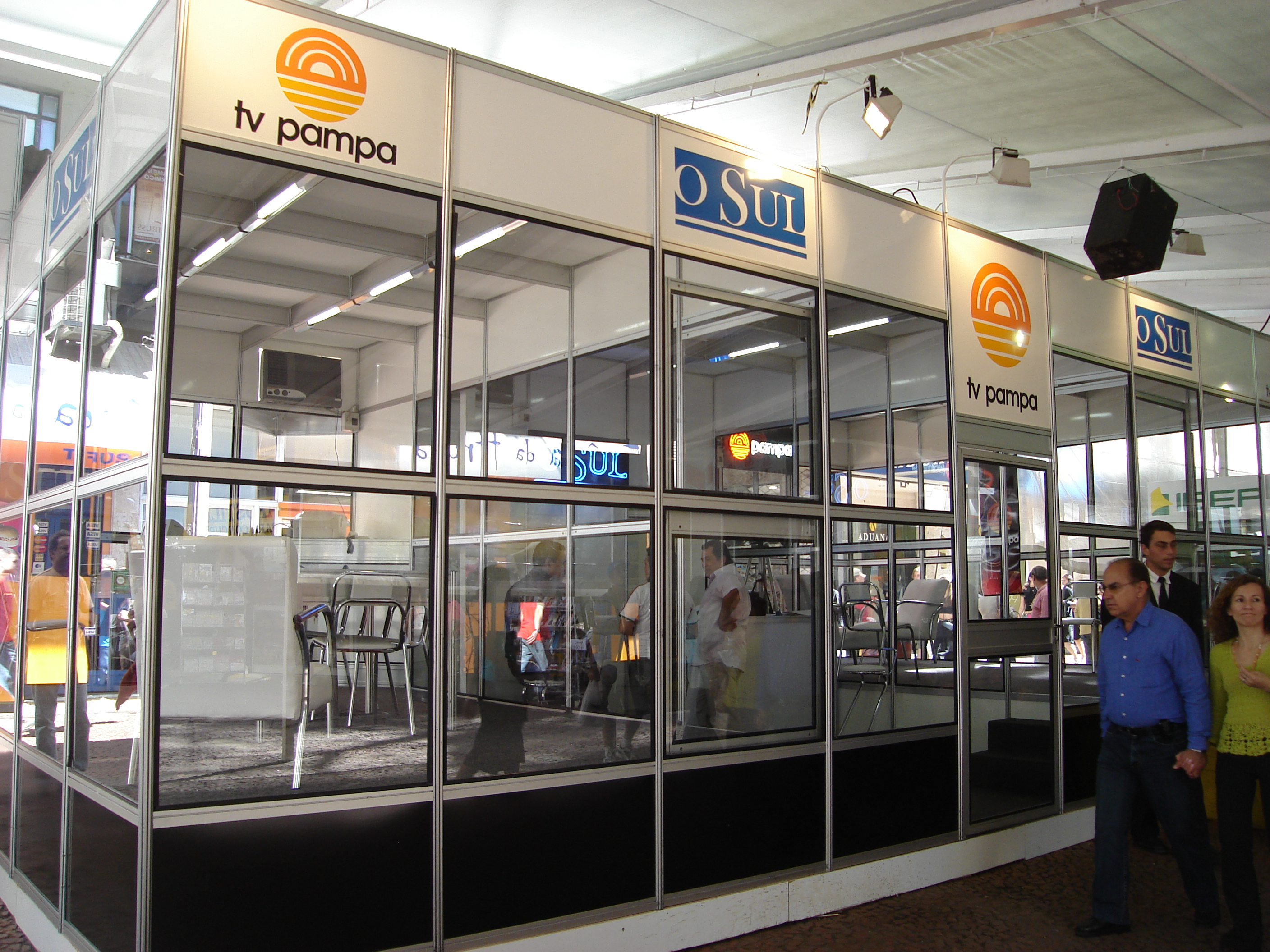
TV Pampa studios at the Porto Alegre Book Fair.

Virtual channel	Digital channel	Screen	Content
4.1	26 UHF	1080i	TV Pampa Porto Alegre/RedeTV!'s main schedule

In the week starting April 26, 2012, TV Pampa made a one-week experimental digital broadcast on UHF channel 26 and adjacent areas, without airing local programming or high definition content, nor RedeTV!'s programming. On the afternoon of April 2, 2013, TV Pampa started digital broadcasts, with local and RedeTV! programming in high definition.

The station shut down its analog signal on March 14, 2018, following the official ANATEL roadmap.

== Programming ==
In addition to RedeTV!'s networked programming, TV Pampa produces and airs the following programming:

- Algo Mais: Variety, with Pedro de Oxum;
- Pampa Debates: Talk show, with Paulo Sérgio Pinto;
- Jornal da Pampa: News, with Gabriela Markus;
- Atualidades Pampa: Current affairs, Magda Beatriz;
- Aliadas com Ali Klemt: Interview program, Ali Klemt.

As a result of airing local programming during network slots, TV Pampa does not air programs such as Papo com Dani, Fica Com a Gente, A Tarde É Sua and RedeTV! News (except the Saturday edition). The station also airs networked programming in different days and timeslots, in a programming block known as Pampa Show. Just like on RedeTV!, most of the schedule is sold to independent or religious progrmaming. Several other local programs also aired on the station and were discontinued:

- Bailanta
- Câmera 4
- Câmera Pampa
- Camisa 10
- Campeões do Ringue
- Carrossel
- Cine Pampa
- Dois Toques
- Estúdio Pampa
- Guerrilheiros da Notícia
- Jornal Meridional
- Marcas e Veículos
- Mensagens do Sul
- Pampa Bom Dia
- Pampa Boa Noite
- Pampa Destaque
- Pampa Esportes
- Pampa em Manchete
- Pampa Entrevista
- Pampa Kids
- Pampa Meio Dia
- Pampa Notícias
- Pampa Repórter
- Panorama
- Programa Clóvis Duarte
- Programa Rosaura Fraga
- Programa Xicão Tofani
- Repórter Pampa
- Rio Grande Nativo
- Saúde em Dia
- Studio Pampa
- Tampinlândia
- Trem da Alegria
- Tri Legal
- Universal FM TV
- Videomúsica
- Vivi na TV
- Zoom
