= Paulinho =

Paulinho is a Portuguese nickname for people named Paulo (Paulo -inho, little Paulo). People known as Paulinho include:

== Music ==
- Paulinho da Costa (born 1948), Brazilian percussionist
- Paulinho da Viola (born 1942), Brazilian sambista
- Paulinho Moska (born 1967), Brazilian composer
- Paulinho Nogueira (1929–2003), Brazilian guitarist
- Paulo César dos Santos (1952–2020), Brazilian vocalist of Roupa Nova

== Portuguese sportsmen ==
=== Football ===
- Paulinho (footballer, born 1966) (Paulo José Ramos Mendes)
- Paulinho Santos (born 1970) (João Paulo Maio dos Santos)
- Paulinho (footballer, born 1985) (Paulo Dinarte Gouveia Pestana)
- Paulinho (footballer, born 1991) (Paulo Sérgio Mota)
- Paulinho (footballer, born March 1992) (Paulo Jorge Almeida Silva)
- Paulinho (footballer, born November 1992) (João Paulo Dias Fernandes)
- Paulinho (footballer, born December 1997) (Paulo Manuel Neves Alves)
- Paulinho (footballer, born 1999) (Paulo Rafael Pereira Araújo)
- Paulinho (footballer, born August 2000) (Paulo Miguel Gomes Ferreira)

=== Futsal ===
- Paulinho (futsal player) (born 1983), full name Paulo Jorge Camões Martins, futsal player

== Brazilian sportsmen ==
=== Football ===
- Paulinho de Almeida (1932–2007)
- Paulinho (footballer, born 1933) (Paulo de Almeida)
- Paulinho Nunes (1936–1994)
- Paulinho Ferreira (born 1940)
- Paulinho (footballer, born 1958) (Paulo Luiz Massariol)
- Paulinho Batistote (born 1959)
- Paulinho Cascavel (born 1959)
- Paulinho Kiss (1960–2015)
- Paulinho Criciúma (born 1961)
- Paulinho McLaren (born 1963)
- Paulinho Carioca (born 1964)
- Paulinho Kobayashi (born 1970)
- Paulinho (footballer, born 1975) (Paulo Benedito Bonifácio Maximiano)
- Paulinho (footballer, born 1977) (Marcos Paulo Paulini)
- Paulinho Guará (born 1979)
- Paulinho Marília (born 1980)
- Paulinho (footballer, born 1981) (Paulo Cesar Rodriguez)
- Paulinho (footballer, born 1982) (Paulo Antonio de Oliveira)
- Paulinho (footballer, born January 1983) (Paulo Robspierry Carreiro)
- Paulinho (footballer, born August 1983) (Paulo Roberto Teles Goes Sobrinho)
- Paulinho (footballer, born January 1986) (Paulo Sérgio Betanin)
- Paulinho Guerreiro (born March 1986)
- Paulinho (footballer, born 5 May 1988) (Paulo Oliveira de Souza Júnior)
- Paulinho Dias (born 13 May 1988)
- Paulinho (footballer, born June 1988) (Paulo Luiz Beraldo Santos)
- Paulinho (footballer, born July 1988) (José Paulo Bezerra Maciel Júnior)
- Paulinho Le Petit (born 1989)
- Paulinho (footballer, born January 1989) (Paulo Roberto Gonzaga)
- Paulinho (footballer, born May 1989) (Paulo Sérgio de Oliveira)
- Paulinho (footballer, born January 1993) (Paulo Modesto da Silva Júnior)
- Paulinho (footballer, born May 1993) (Paulo Victor de Menezes Melo)
- Paulinho Moccelin (born 1994)
- Paulinho (footballer, born 1994) (Paulo Henrique Soares dos Santos)
- Paulinho (footballer, born 1995) (Paulo Victor da Silva)
- Paulinho (footballer, born January 1997) (Paulo Lucas Santos de Paula)
- Paulinho (footballer, born August 1997) (Paulo Henrique Rolim de Genova)
- Paulinho (footballer, born 1998) (Paulo Henrique Pereira da Silva)
- Paulinho (footballer, born July 2000) (Paulo Henrique Sampaio Filho)
- Paulinho (footballer, born 2004) (Paulo Ricardo Alves Ibelli)
- Paulinho (footballer, born 17 May 2005) (Paulo Sérgio Venuto Bezerra)
- Paulinho (footballer, born 23 May 2005) (Paulo Ricardo de Souza Babilônia)

=== Basketball ===
- Paulinho Boracini (born 1984)

== Others ==
- Paulinho Paiakan (1955–2020), Brazilian indigenous leader

== See also ==
- Paul (disambiguation)
- Paulão
- Paulo
- Palhinha
