= Paulo Machado (disambiguation) =

Paulo Machado may refer to:

- Paulo Machado (born 1986), Portuguese footballer
- Paulo Machado (swimmer) (born 1978), Brazilian swimmer
- Paulo Machado de Carvalho, president of São Paulo Futebol Clube and founder of Rede Record
- Paulo Machado de Carvalho Filho (1924–2010), Brazilian businessman

== See also ==
- Estádio do Pacaembu, Brazil, official name Estádio Municipal Paulo Machado de Carvalho
