= Record Litoral e Vale =

Record Litoral e Vale (ZYB 894)
- Santos/São José dos Campos, São Paulo; Brazil
- City: Santos
- Channels: Digital: 33 (UHF); Virtual: 8

Programming
- Affiliations: Record

Ownership
- Owner: Grupo Record; (Rádio e Televisão Record S.A.)

History
- First air date: February 20, 1993
- Former names: TV Mar (1993-2008); TV Record Litoral (2008-2016); TV Record Vale do Paraíba (2009-2016); RecordTV Litoral/Vale (2016-2021); RecordTV Litoral e Vale (2016-2023)
- Former channel numbers: Analog: 8 (VHF, 1993–2017)
- Former affiliations: Rede Manchete (1992-1999); RedeTV! (transitional TV! phase only, 1999)

Technical information
- Licensing authority: ANATEL
- ERP: 1.07 kW
- Transmitter coordinates: 23°57′35.9″S 46°21′10.1″W

Links
- Public license information: Profile
- Website: noticias.r7.com/sao-paulo/litoral-vale/

Record Litoral e Vale (channel 8) is a Record-owned-and-operated station licensed to Santos. Its studios are located on the Vila Mathias neighborhood, while its transmitting antenna is atop Morro Santa Teresinha. The station also has an office in São José dos Campos, where parts of its local programming, as well as reports from Vale do Paraíba, are produced.

== History ==
TV Mar started broadcasting on February 20, 1993, owned by politician Gastone Righi's company Mar Comunicação. Initially, it was an affiliate of Rede Manchete, which received financing from its sister radio outlet, 95 FM, to obtain the necessary investments. Since at least 1995, the station had a strong local production unit, beginning with the debate program Jornal Opinião with Hélio Ansaldo. In 1997, iconic local program Ilha Porchat na TV moved here from TVB Santos.

Rede Manchete was facing a crisis, and in 1998, the station started replacing some of the network's infomercials evangelical paid programming with programs from TV Senac. Although it experienced the experimental phase of RedeTV! when it was simply branded as TV!, it decided not to renew its contract and opted to join Record instead. This caused a unique situation where Santos had two Record stations on the VHF band, the other being a relay of Record São Paulo that was on channel 6. The switch took place when the transitional phase between Manchete and the full launch of RedeTV! was carrying a rerun of Pantanal, which was left unfinished. Even after the affiliation changed, its newscast was still named Mar em Manchete. The network, through its main station in São Paulo, did have a first in Santos, the first major outside broadcast of a football match, in 1955.

In 2004, the station was acquired by the Record network. Gradually, the network's brand was being enforced: Mar em Manchete was renamed Litoral Record in 2006 and the station was renamed Record Litoral.

On April 8, 2008, the station bought a plot of land to build its new studios, worth US$22 million. With the expansion of its coverage area in 2009 to Vale do Paraíba, replacing the former Record São Paulo relays, it was renamed Record Litoral e Vale.
