= Record Interior SP =

- Franca/Ribeirão Preto, São Paulo; Brazil
- Channels: Digital: 20 (UHF); Virtual: 13

Programming
- Affiliations: Record

Ownership
- Owner: Grupo Record; (TV Imperador Ltda.)

History
- First air date: July 7, 1979
- Former names: TV Imperador (1979–1990); TV Record Franca/Ribeirão Preto (1990–2014); TV Record Interior (2014–2016); RecordTV Interior SP (2016–2023)
- Former channel numbers: Analog: 7 (VHF, 1979-2017)

Technical information
- Licensing authority: ANATEL
- ERP: 15 kW
- Transmitter coordinates: 20°30′19.9″S 47°24′7.7″W

Links
- Public license information: Profile
- Website: record.r7.com/record-emissoras/sudeste/record-interior-sp/

Record Interior SP (channel 13) is a Record-owned-and-operated television station located in Franca, covering parts of the state's inland.

== History ==
The license for VHF channel 4 in Franca was granted by president Ernesto Geisel on November 10, 1975, to a company led by businessman Agostinho Galgani, owner of Rádio Imperador, founded in 1971. TV Imperador was inaugurated on July 7, 1979, holiday of the 1932 Constitutionalist Revolution, at 5pm. Initially, it had a line-up consisting of local programs and relays from TV Record from the state capital.

On June 23, 1981, the station was sold to the owners of TV Record, Paulo Machado de Carvalho and Silvio Santos, being another phase of the expansion of the Record network in the state. In that decade, the station inaugurated its headquarters at Jardim Redentor, in 1982, and the implementation of an office in Ribeirão Preto, created in 1984, which was replaced years later by a larger facility, at the Sumarezinho neighborhood. In 1989, it was acquired by businessman and bishop of the Universal Church of the Kingdom of God, Edir Macedo, and, with the creation of a national Record network in 1990, it was renamed TV Record Franca/Ribeirão Preto.

On August 29, 2010, the station inaugurated an office with commercial, marketing and news departments in the city of São Carlos. On April 12, 2011, it was the turn for the Ribeirão Preto office to move to new premises, erected in the same location as the former one, with 3000 m² and a wide newsroom, where the station's news operation was now being produced. In 2014, its nomenclature became TV Record Interior, then with the 2016 rebrand, RecordTV Interior SP, and with the 2023 rebrand, Record Interior SP.

== Technical information ==
=== Subchannels ===
Channel	Video	Aspect	Short name	Programming
13.1	1080i	16:9	Record	Main Record Interior SP programming / Record

The station started its digital broadcasts on September 25, 2014, for Franca and the surrounding region on UHF channel 14, and on October 16 to Ribeirão Preto and neighboring areas, on UHF channel 28. In the operation, instead of using virtual channel 4.1 which would be from the generator in Franca, 13.1 is used instead, which was the analog channel of the relayer in Ribeirão Preto.

=== Analog-to-digital conversion ===
The station shut down its analog signal on February 21, 2018, per the official ANATEL roadmap.

=== Satellite relay ===
Record Interior SP started relaying its signal on the Star One D2 satellite in Ku Band mode on December 21, 2023.
