= Boris Casoy =

Brazilian journalist

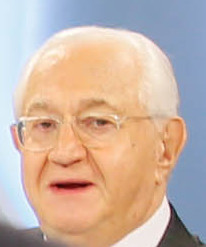
- Casoy in 2015
- Born: February 13, 1941 (age 85); São Paulo, Brazil
- Occupations: Journalist, newscaster
- Relatives: Ilana Casoy (niece)

Boris Casoy (born February 13, 1941) is a Brazilian journalist, the son of Russian Jewish immigrant parents. He has spent most of his professional life in TV journalism and is currently a Brazilian TV news anchorman.

== Career ==
Casoy's journalism career started when he worked as a reporter for the now defunct television network TV Tupi in 1961. During the 1960s, in the early phases of the military dictatorship in Brazil, he was charged by the press with belonging to a paramilitary right-wing organization, Commando for Communist Hunting (Comando de Caça aos Comunistas, CCC) which was aimed at harassing and bullying leftist students.

From 1974 to 1984, Casoy worked in the Paulista newspaper, Folha de S.Paulo - firstly as chief editor, a position in which he had to share power with the redaction director, the Trotskyist sympathizer Cláudio Abramo. In 1976, Casoy left this position and began editing a column on political faits divers, while Abramo took over the paper's chief editorship. However, in September 1977, Casoy resumed his earlier position, after the military threatened to intervene in the paper, holding Abramo responsible for the publication in the paper of a chronicle, by Lourenço Diaféria, deemed as demeaning to the historical figure of the Luís Alves de Lima e Silva, Duke of Caxias, the civic patron of the Brazilian Army.

In 1988, Casoy returned to television as the anchor of a new newscast for SBT, Telejornal Brasil (TJ Brasil, for short). TJ Brasil ran from 1988 until being canceled in 1997. After Casoy left TJ Brasil on June 30, 1997, he became the main anchor of Rede Record's national news, Jornal da Record. As anchor, Casoy became famous for his rhetorical outbursts, as he acquired the habit of expressing disagreement with unpleasant facts (mainly corruption scandals) he had described by uttering repeatedly: "For shame!" ("isto é uma vergonha!") - a stock-phrase that gave him the reputation of a vigilante who would speak truth to power.

Casoy was fired from TV Record in late December 2005 – officially, for disagreements with changes that the station wanted to make on his program. However, he had speculated that there was pressure from the Worker's Party, since he and his crew were unrelenting in investigating and exposing alleged scandals and corruption cases in the left-wing government.

After being fired from Rede Record, Casoy returned to television, but this time on a small regional television network in Rio de Janeiro, TV JB. He was the main anchor to the main newscast, Telejornal do Brasil. On April 14, 2008, Boris Casoy returned to national television on Rede Bandeirantes as the main anchor for its nightly newscast, Jornal da Noite. Casoy also presents the news in Rede Bandeirantes' radio news network, BandNews FM.

In 2010, Casoy was involved in a scandal: after a TV news broadcast in which two street sweepers appeared offering season's greetings, he offered a private comment during commercials, without noticing that the audio channel was inadvertently open: "Shit, two garbage men offering greetings from atop their brooms... the lowest rung of the working ladder." – a comment for which he had to apologize in public.

On September 30, 2016, Casoy left Band's nightly news program Jornal da Noite. On October 17, he became anchor of RedeTV!'s national news, RedeTV! News, replacing Sérgio Cursino. However on September 29, 2020, he was fired from the station.

After being fired from RedeTV!, Casoy launched his own YouTube channel named Jornal do Boris in October of the same year. The channel was inspired from O Trabuco, a program presented by journalist and broadcaster Vicente Leporaceby from Radio Bandeirantes, which was broadcast on Alpha Channel TV.
