= Paulão =

Paulão is a Portuguese nickname derived from Paulo, meaning "Great Paul" or "Big Paul". Notable people known as Paulão include:

- Paulão (1962–2026), Brazilian journalist and radio host born Paulo César Martin
- Paulão (born 1963), Brazilian volleyball player born Paulo André Jukoski da Silva
- Paulão (footballer, born 1969) (1969-2021), Angolan football midfielder born Paulo António Alves
- Paulão (born 1967), Brazilian football defender born Paulo César Batista dos Santos
- Paulão Moreira (1969-2025), Brazilian beach volleyball player born Paulo Roberto Moreira da Costa
- Paulão (born 1973), Brazilian football defender born Paulo Frederico Benevenute
- Paulão (born 1982), Brazilian football defender born Paulo Afonso Santos Júnior
- Paulão (born 1985), Brazilian football striker born Paulo Roberto do Carmo
- Paulão (born 1986), Brazilian football defender born Paulo Marcos de Jesus Ribeiro
- Paulão (footballer, born 1989), Brazilian football defender born Luis Paulo da Silva
- Paulão Prestes (born 1988), Brazilian basketball player born Paulo Sérgio Prestes
- Paulão (1962–2026), Brazilian journalist and radio host born Paulo César Martin

== See also ==
- Paulinho (disambiguation), the opposite, Little Paul
