= Jornal do Brasil =

Brazilian newspaper

Coordinates: 22.89393°S 43.21522°W

- Type: Daily newspaper
- Format: Berliner (when printed); Virtual
- Owner: Omar Resende Peres Filho
- Founder: Rodolfo Dantas
- Editor: Gilberto Menezes Côrtes
- Photo editor: José Marinho Peres
- Founded: 9 April 1891; 135 years ago
- Language: Brazilian Portuguese
- Headquarters: Avenida Rio Branco, 53, Rio de Janeiro, RJ
- Country: Brazil
- OCLC number: 1754340
- Website: jb.com.br

Jornal do Brasil, widely known as JB, is a daily newspaper published by Editora JB in Rio de Janeiro, Brazil. The paper was founded in 1891 and is the third oldest extant Brazilian paper, after the Diário de Pernambuco and O Estado de S. Paulo. On 31 August 2010 it became a digital newspaper, folding its print edition until 25 February 2018, when it resumed publication.

== History ==
It is often believed that the newspaper was founded by former supporters of the deposed monarchy and sported conservative views in its early decades. However at the time, the monarchy was leading the fight for the end of slavery so can be considered liberal for the period. Many important Brazilian writers and journalists eventually worked for Jornal do Brasil, especially after the 1964 coup d'état. Jornal do Brasil was an important opponent for challenging censorship although it never was radically against the dictatorship and its editors did not follow a rebellious line against the government, rather they avoided such conflict. At times however, but to a lesser extent than the São Paulo paper 'Estadão' they replaced censored news with cake recipes, or news from articles on international news instead of polemic Brazilian stories.

What some people do not realise that the newspaper made its great profits from the advertisement it sold, it had at times up to 5 supplements on different areas of the Rio market. To sell almost anything in Rio de Janeiro, the main city in Brazil at the time, you had to advertise in JB. News was of secondary consequence until its owner, the countess, decided to change the line of the paper to a more standard format, and journalism was taken more seriously.

In 1992 the paper published an unflattering photo of Henry Kissinger on the front page. Kissinger's lawyer sent a cease and desist letter threatening to sue them if they sold the photo. The newspaper refused and one of the buyers was the advertising agency Woolward & Partners who used it in an advertisement for computer equipment. Woolward & Partners was also threatened with legal action. The photograph was also used in the 1996 book Washington Babylon by Alexander Cockburn and Ken Silverstein.

The paper suffered after the Brazilian boom years having too much credit in dollar. With the oil crisis their stocks fell and they suffered until they were sold JB was the first Brazilian newspaper to have an electronic edition which included partial PDF-publishing. In 2002, it was sold to businessman Nelson Tanure who restructured it again. It still holds slightly left positions, compared to its major rival, O Globo.

JB is pictured in the Academy Award-nominated film Cidade de Deus, as the newspaper where the main character, Buscapé, begins working as a photographer. The movie is set in Rio de Janeiro during the 1960s-1980s, the golden age of the paper, before it started its long decaying period.

On 31 August 2010, JB ceased its printed version, becoming online-only until 25 February 2018, when it was relaunched at Rio's newsstands.

== See also ==
- TV Jornal do Brasil
