= Paulo Sousa (disambiguation) =

Paulo Sousa (born 1970) is a Portuguese footballer and coach.

Paulo Sousa may also refer to:

- Paulo Sousa (singer) (born 1992), Portuguese singer-songwriter and YouTuber
- Paulo Sousa (footballer, born 1967), Portuguese footballer
- Paulo Sousa (footballer, born 1975), Portuguese footballer
- Paulo Sousa (footballer, born 1980), Portuguese footballer

== See also ==
- Paulo Souza (disambiguation)
