= Record Rio Preto =

Record Rio Preto (ZYQ 887)
São José do Rio Preto, São Paulo; Brazil
- Channels: Digital: 42 (UHF); Virtual: 7

Programming
- Affiliations: Record

Ownership
- Owner: Grupo Record; (TV Record de Rio Preto S/A)

History
- First air date: September 15, 1971
- Former call signs: ZYB 861 (1971–2018)
- Former names: TV Rio Preto (1971–1990); TV Record Rio Preto (1990–2016); RecordTV Rio Preto (2016–2023)
- Former channel numbers: Analog: 7 (VHF, 1971–2018)
- Former affiliations: Rede Tupi (1971–1978)

Technical information
- Licensing authority: ANATEL
- ERP: 3.4 kW
- Transmitter coordinates: 23°33′36.6″S 46°39′25.4″W

Links
- Public license information: Profile
- Website: record.r7.com/record-rio-preto/

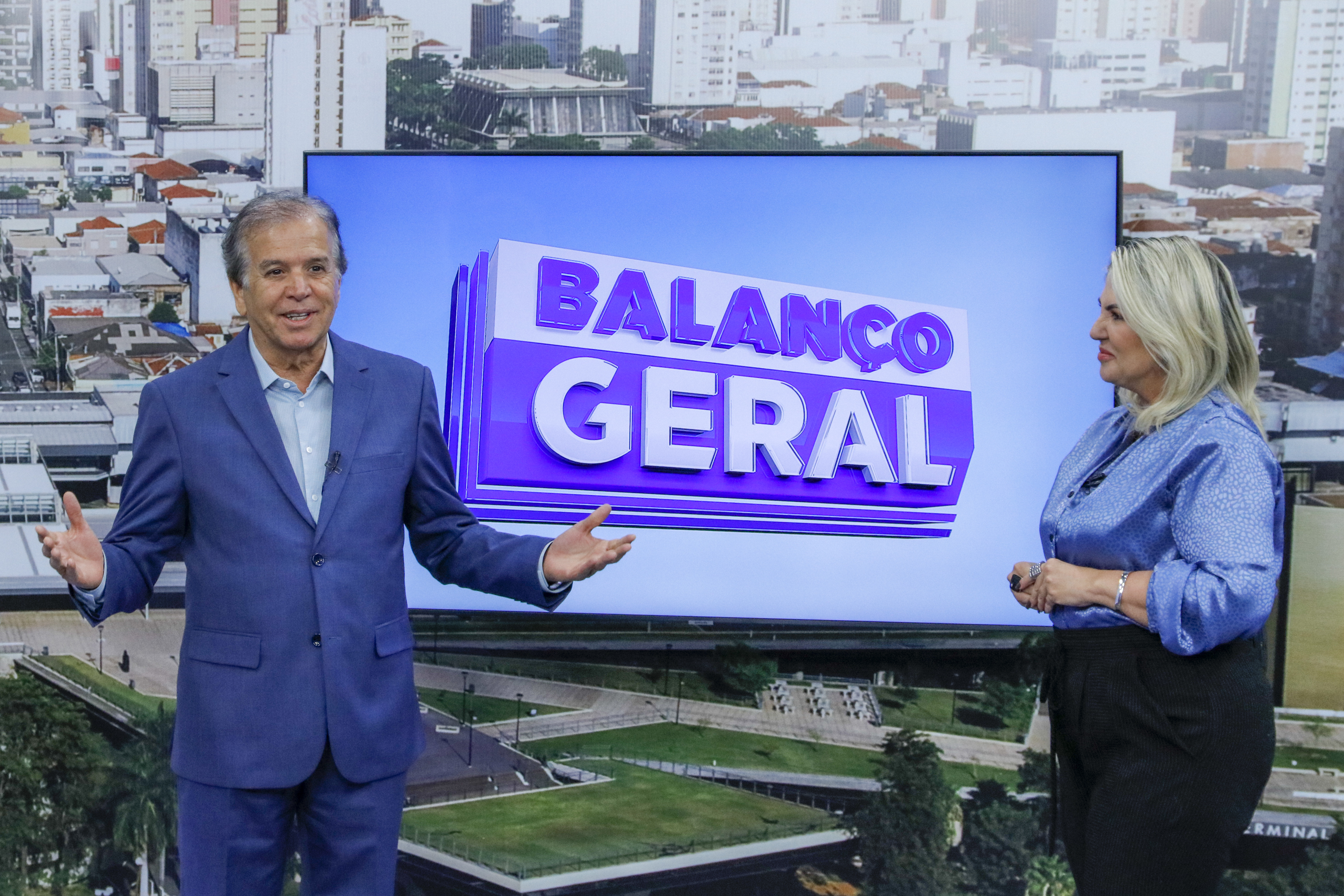
Set of the local Balanço Geral

Record Rio Preto (channel 7) is a Brazilian television station located in São José do Rio Preto, as a Record affiliate for 198 municipalities in northern, north-western and western São Paulo.

== History ==
The station opened on September 15, 1971, as a Rede Tupi affiliate associated with TV Record from the state capital. It was owned by businessman Edson Garcia Nunes and its schedule consisted mainly of films and TV series. In 1973, the station was acquired by Catanduva businessman Varlei Agudo Romão and started carrying sporting events, usually soccer matches from local teams América and Rio Preto, as well as children's tournaments. During its early years, Ana Maria Braga started her television career presenting its news program Jornal de Verdade. At the end of 1978, the station was de facto independent, alongside TV Record. Other key local programs from its independent phase included Amaury Júnior na TV, Programa Silveira Lima, Sala dos Esportes and A Porteira do 8, which survived the 1989 buying.

In 1989, Edir Macedo bought the Record stations in São Paulo to build a national network. The TV Rio Preto archives were destroyed. As a Record O&O, this time as part of a national instead of regional network, its directorate changed in 1998, prioritizing local productions.

== Technical information ==
Channel	Video	Aspect	Short name	Programming
7.1	1080i	16:9	Record	Main Record Rio Preto programming / Record

The station shut down its VHF signal on March 28, 2018, following the official ANATEL roadmap.
