= Paulo Santos =

Paulo Santos may refer to:

- Paulo Santos (Portuguese footballer) (Paulo Jorge Silva dos Santos, born 1972), Portuguese football goalkeeper
- Paulo Futre (Paulo Jorge dos Santos Futre, born 1966), former Portuguese football winger
- Paulo Dos Santos (Cape Verdean footballer) (born 1973), Cape Verdean football midfielder
- Paulo Santos (Brazilian footballer) (born 1960), Brazilian former footballer
- Paulo Roberto Santos (born 1958), Brazilian footballer and manager

== See also ==
- Paulo
