= Paulo Ribeiro (disambiguation) =

Paulo Ribeiro (born 1984) is a Portuguese football goalkeeper.

Paulo Ribeiro may also refer to:

- Paulo Machado (born 1986), Portuguese football midfielder
- João Paulo Pinto Ribeiro (born 1980), Portuguese football centre forward
- Paulo Almeida Ribeiro (1932–2007), Brazilian football player
