= Paulo Machado de Carvalho Filho =

Paulo Machado de Carvalho Filho (April 25, 1924 – September 14, 2010) was a Brazilian businessman and impresario who founded Jovem Pan Radio, which is based in São Paulo. He was also known as Paulinho Machado de Carvalho. He served as the first president of the Associação Brasileira das Emissoras de Rádio e Televisão (ABERT). Terra Networks has called him one of the most important people in the history of Brazilian media.

Filho was born in São Paulo, the son of Paulo Machado de Carvalho (1901–1992), who founded Rádio Record in 1932. Filho worked at for several years, until the company was sold to Edir Macedo. He began working in Brazilian television, which was at its infancy in the country at the time. Filho was credited with creating several important Brazilian television series, including Família Trapo.

Filho also worked as a concert promoter and impresario, recruiting such international artists as Sammy Davis Jr., Louis Armstrong and Nat King Cole to perform in Brazil. He served as the head of Rádio Records during the 1960s and promoted several important music festivals during that era. He founded Rádio Panamericana, which is now known as Jovem Pan.

Paulo Machado de Carvalho Filho died of prostate cancer on September 14, 2010, at the hospital Sírio-Libanês in São Paulo at the age of 86. He was buried at the Cemitério do Morumbi in São Paulo.
