= Paulinho Batistote =

Brazilian footballer

Personal information
- Full name: Paulo Batistote
- Date of birth: 30 January 1959 (age 67)
- Place of birth: Campo Grande, Brazil
- Position: Right winger

Youth career
- Comercial-MS

Senior career*
Years	Team	Apps	(Gls)
1975–1979	Comercial-MS		
1978	→ Rio Preto (loan)		
1979	→ São Paulo (loan)	2	(0)
1980–1981	Democrata-GV		
1982–1983	Santos	64	(4)
1983	Cruzeiro	21	(1)
1984–1985	Taquaritinga		
- * Club domestic league appearances and goals as of 30 December 2023

Paulo Batistote (born 30 January 1959), is a Brazilian former professional footballer who played as a right winger.

== Career ==
Right winger, Paulinho Batistote played for São Paulo, Santos, where he was part of the Brazilian runner-up squad in 1983, and Cruzeiro. He ended his career at CA Taquaritinga in 1985.

== Honours ==
Comercial-MS

- Campeonato Mato-Grossense: 1975

Democrata-GV

- Taça Minas Gerais: 1981
