= Paulo Souza =

Paulo Souza may refer to:

- Paulo Renato Souza (1945–2011), Brazilian economist and politician
- Paulo Souza (athlete), see Brazil at the 2012 Summer Paralympics and Brazil at the 2011 Parapan American Games
- Paulo Souza (footballer) (1944–2006), Brazilian football central defender

== See also ==
- Paulo Sousa (disambiguation)
- Marcos (footballer, born 1974) (Marcos Paulo Souza Ribeiro)
- Leandro Souza (footballer, born 1987) (Leandro Paulo Roberto Souza)
- João Paulo (footballer, born April 1988) (João Paulo de Souza Dantas)
- Paulo Vinícius (footballer, born 1990) (Paulo Vinícius Souza dos Santos)
