= Record Guaíba =

Record Guaíba (ZYB 622)
- Porto Alegre, Rio Grande do Sul; Brazil
- Channels: Digital: 21 (UHF); Virtual: 2

Programming
- Affiliations: Record

Ownership
- Owner: Grupo Record; (Televisão Guaíba Ltda.)
- Sister stations: Rádio Guaíba

History
- First air date: March 10, 1979
- Former names: TV2 Guaíba (1979-2007); TV Record Rio Grande do Sul (2007-2016); RecordTV RS (2016-2023); Record RS (2023-2024)
- Former channel numbers: Analog: 2 (VHF, 1979–2018)
- Former affiliations: Independent (1979-2007)

Technical information
- Licensing authority: ANATEL
- ERP: 6 kW
- Transmitter coordinates: 30°4′54″S 51°10′59.6″W

Links
- Public license information: Profile
- Website: record.r7.com/record-emissoras/sul/record-rs/

Record Guaíba (channel 2) is a Brazilian television station based in Porto Alegre, capital of the state of Rio Grande do Sul carrying the Record network for most of the state. It is owned by Grupo Record, alongside Rádio Guaíba and the newspaper Correio do Povo with its studios being located in Santa Tereza, and its transmitter is at the top of Morro da Polícia.

== History ==
TV Guaíba was founded on March 10, 1979, by Breno Caldas, son of journalist Caldas Júnior, the founder of the newspaper Correio do Povo. The channel's first broadcast was at 9pm, with the broadcast of the Rainha das Piscinas beauty contest, live from Ginásio Gigantinho. Without any type of affiliation with other national networks, TV Guaíba stood out in regional programs focusing on journalism, sport, cuisine, variety and culture. Films and series also occupied a large part of the programming, mainly Paramount productions distributed by Network Distribuidora de Filmes, as well as international documentaries distributed by the German Transtel (today incorporated by Deutsche Welle).

In the station's first phase, channel 2 broadcast its programming from 5:30 pm, when it began its daily schedule with an educational program produced by TVE Brasil in Rio de Janeiro, followed by an American series. From 7:30 pm onwards, Guaíba Ao Vivo was shown, following the model of programs shown locally at lunchtime, with comment boards, news, sports and varieties (such as the pioneer Diário de Notícias, from TV Piratini, Jornal do Almoço, from TV Gaúcha and Portovisão, from TV Difusora). Guaíba Ao Vivo took advantage of the team of communicators from Rádio Guaíba and the newspaper Correio do Povo, such as Rogério Mendelski, Adroaldo Streck, João Carlos Belmonte, Edegar Schmidt, Sérgio Jockymann, Carrion Júnior, as well as Ivette Brandalise, José Fontela, Sérgio Schueller, Gustavo Motta and Paulo Nilson. Actress Suzana Saldanha presented the first section of the program, with interviews and subjects of feminine or cultural interest, but lost her job when the network entered its second phase, on March 31, 1981. On Saturdays, the TV2 Pop Show was shown, with Cascalho Contursi, aimed at young audiences. The program's intro was reused from a homonymous program by TV Cultura in São Paulo, which also had some of its identification vignettes recycled by Guaíba.

When competitor TV Difusora was purchased by Rede Bandeirantes, most of the local programming was eliminated. As a result, Guaíba, which had hired Sérgio Reis (who had opened TV Piratini in the 1950s), brought the big names from channel 10 and started broadcasting from 10:30 am. The first local program to go on air in the new phase was Guaíba Feminina, presented from Monday to Friday from 11:30 am to 2:30 pm, presented by Tânia Carvalho, Magda Beatriz, Liliana Reid, Marina Conter and Aninha Comas.

Tânia Carvalho was one of the best-known names on television in Rio Grande do Sul, since she returned from São Paulo, where she had been part of the group around filmmaker Glauber Rocha, with her husband and father of her son Fabiano, actor Geraldo Del Rey. Tânia had presented the show "Variedades", alongside Célia Bier, on Jornal do Almoço, on TV Gaúcha, later transferring to TV Difusora's competitor, Portovisão. On her debut in Guaíba, she wore a green coat that covered her pregnant belly with her second child with businessman Felício dos Santos, Diogo, who would be born weeks later. Magda Beatriz was the presenter of the news show Câmera 10, on TV Difusora, which aired daily at the end of the night, with a local focus. Liliana Reid had worked on the children's program Clubinho Gaúcha Zero Hora, on channel 12, and came to Guaíba with her husband, programming director Sérgio Reis. Marina Conter had worked decades before at TV Piratini as a poster girl, selling products during commercial breaks, live, at the time. Aninha Comas was a professional cook, popular among Porto Alegre socialites.

In April 1981, Guaíba Criança went on air, filling the afternoons with cartoons and children's games. Actor Roberto de Oliveira became "Remendão", who presented the program, in the first year with actress Cássia Aguiar and, from the second year, with Vera Mucilo. Children who sent coupons cut out from Correio do Povo or Folha da Tarde could be invited to the program's audience and compete live for the famous quindins given by Remendão.

Prime time, created by Sérgio Reis, had, from 9:30 pm, right after Guaíba ao Vivo, several local programs. On Mondays, the Cadeira Cativa sports debate was aired, presented by Armindo Antonio Ranzolin. On Tuesdays there was the political interview program Espaço Aberto, presented by Amir Domingues. Other programs from the broadcaster's golden phase were Vox Populi, with interviews, Ask a Guaíba, presented by Portuguese language professor Édson de Oliveira, from the University Pre-Entrance Course, answering questions from viewers and Viajando com a Guaíba, presented by Ernani Behs.

TV Guaíba was also marked by horse racing broadcasts during commercial breaks, on Saturday and Sunday afternoons, probably thanks to the fact that the owner, Breno Caldas, owns a stud farm and is an avid investor in the sport. The network's Saturday nights, in the early 1980s, were filled with the series Columbo, McMillan and Wife and McCloud, followed by Cine 2.

When Companhia Jornalística Caldas Júnior went bankrupt, journalist and playwright Sérgio Jockymann took the reins of the broadcaster for several months, before businessman Renato Bastos Ribeiro bought the company. During the period in which Jockymann ran the channel, the Aqui e Agora program aired at noon. Soon after, he launched, with producer Claudinho Pereira, the Magda Beatriz Program, featuring cultural interviews. Guaíba Feminina started to be presented in the late afternoons by Marla Martins (daughter of journalist Lasier Martins), Isabel Ibias and Aninha Comas. The Clip Clap music video program was presented by Gaio Fontela. The nights were filled with series and Guaíba Notícias. Every week, José Fontela only lent his voice to the interview program A Nova Face do Rio Grande.

With the purchase by Ribeiro, Jockymann and his programming were replaced and the playwright went to court to demand compensation from Ribeiro for his lost expenses. Jockymann joined the channel's "black list", never appearing in its images again, even though he was, for years, an important councilor in Porto Alegre. During the Ribeiros' management, the TV was managed by the owner's sister, Helena Bastos Ribeiro. It was almost all rented to independent producers who were responsible for sponsorship sales, giving a percentage to the broadcaster.

Some of the highlights of TV Guaíba's local programming, after its purchase by the Ribeiro family, were the journalist Flávio Alcaraz Gomes with his program Guerrilheiros da Notícia, which aired daily from 7pm to 8:15pm; Clovis Duarte with Câmera 2, which went on air at 10:30 pm; the doctor and journalist Abraão Winogron with the weekly Medicina e Saúde; José Silvas with Atividade, daily at noon; Marlei Soares with Palavra de Mulher, which was presented during the week from 4:25 pm, Luiz Carlos Reche with Cadeira Cativa and João Bosco Vaz with Encontro com o Esporte, shown on Saturdays; the traditionalist musical Querência, always broadcast from a different municipality in the state, presented by Jair Silva; The Arco-Íris Project was a pioneering program on ecological issues. Sports program presenter Rogério Amaral spent years at the station, with a night program after Guerrilheiros da Notícia.

Among the famous series that aired in the last phase of TV Guaíba are: Star Trek, Star Trek: The Next Generation, The Wild Wild West, The Three Stooges, JAG, Mission: Impossible, The Love Boat, Automan, Sharivan, Machine Man, Goggle V, Beverly Hills, 90210, Sabrina, the Teenage Witch, Hack, Haunted and Largo Winch.

In early 2003, Rede Record lost coverage in Rio Grande do Sul after its affiliate, TV Pampa, migrated to RedeTV!. At the time, the possibility of forming an affiliation with TV Guaíba was analyzed, but the management of the station in Rio Grande do Sul ruled out this possibility, as it wanted to maintain its independent programming. In April, TV Pampa resumed the network's broadcasts, citing commercial losses with RedeTV!.

In 2004, TV Guaíba participated in the Gaucha Football Federation's bid to broadcast Gauchão 2004, together with RBS TV. Guaíba had won the bid and acquired the championship exclusively, having agreed by contract to broadcast 36 games. RBS TV tried to acquire part of the rights, proposing the payment of 500 thousand reais, but Aluizio Ribeiro, the broadcaster's commercial director, ended up refusing.

TV Guaíba used some professionals from Rádio Guaíba to provide coverage. The team included narrator Paulo Cesar Carvalho, commentators Rogério Amaral and Cláudio Duarte and reporters Denis Luciano and Rodrigo Koch, the latter, on the radio, were sports presenters and on-call staff. Some games were broadcast on VT, with narration by Gilberto Júnior, André Silva and Geraldo Andrade. In the interior of the state, the matches were shown on TV Pampa, which rebroadcast them in regions that were not covered by TV Guaíba. Such transmissions were repeated until the end of the broadcaster, but without broadcast exclusivity, sharing them precisely with RBS TV, including broadcasting VTs of games that took place on days and times when there were no broadcasts from the broadcaster or in Dupla Grenal games in home, usually at night, before or after Camera 2, depending on the time at which the match to be broadcast took place.

On February 21, 2007, the administrative director of Sistema Guaíba-Correio do Povo, Carlos Bastos Ribeiro, Renato's brother, announced that TV Guaíba, together with Rádio Guaíba and Guaíba FM had been sold to Grupo Record for an estimated value of 100 million reais. On March 12, the sale of the newspaper Correio do Povo to the group was also confirmed. On the same day, Rede Record announced the termination of the contract with its then-affiliate, TV Pampa, which was scheduled to run until 2008.

Relations between the two had deteriorated after the Rio Grande do Sul station refused to meet the standards required by the network in its local programming, and also after an unsuccessful attempt to purchase TV Pampa and other outlets from Rede Pampa de Comunicação, which motivated the network to look for a new partnership. However, unlike the Porto Alegre broadcaster, Record continued to maintain its affiliation with the components of Rede Pampa in the interior of the state (TV Pampa Norte de Carazinho, TV Pampa Centro de Santa Maria and TV Pampa Sul de Pelotas) through a secondary agreement expected to run until 2009.

On March 16, Grupo Record executive Jerônimo Alves Ferreira was officially presented as the new CEO of the acquired vehicles, which came under his command on March 20. With the change of control of TV Guaíba, an investment plan was drawn up that involved the installation of state-of-the-art equipment, construction of a modern newsroom and the hiring of professionals specialized in the technical, commercial and journalistic areas of the other competitors.

Channel 2 aired its independent programming for the last time on June 30, and the last program shown as TV Guaíba was Musical (airing The Caliph of Baghdad from the Transtel catalog). Minutes before midnight on July 1, the station aired its traditional sign-on and sign-off video of with images of Rio Grande do Sul to the sound of an instrumental version of "Gauchinha Bem Querer", composed by Tito Madi. Then, a slide went live with a countdown to the debut of TV Record Rio Grande do Sul, with orchestrated music playing and carrying the following message: "Vem aí a TV dos Gaúchos". At noon, a special program was broadcast presenting the new programming to viewers in Rio Grande do Sul, and then the program Tudo É Possível was shown. On the same day, TV Pampa Porto Alegre returned to broadcast RedeTV!'s programming.

On November 14, 2024, eyeing a greater reapproach to the local public, Record RS abandoned the 2007 nomenclature and became Record Guaíba, bringing back its founding name. The announcement was made during Rio Grande Record, which had the presence of advertisers, personalities and presenters of the station. The change eyed at approaching the old phase as an independent station as well as its current phase as a Record O&O, while also approaching its public more to its local programming. Aside from the rename, «Rio Grande no Ar, which came at the start of its affiliation with Record, was renamed Guaíba no Ar, giving more emphasis to the return of the classic nomenclature.
