= Paulo (surname) =

Paulo is a surname. Notable people with the surname include:

- Oriol Paulo (born 1975), Spanish thriller film director and screenwriter
- Ti'i Paulo (born 1983), Samoan rugby player
- Pierre-Antoine Paulo (1944–2021), Haitian bishop
- Helena Paulo (born 1998), Angolan handball player
