= Paulinho Kiss =

Brazilian footballer

Personal information
- Full name: Paulo Roberto Patricio de Souza
- Date of birth: 7 June 1960
- Place of birth: Felixlândia, Brazil
- Date of death: 5 December 2015 (aged 55)
- Place of death: Belo Horizonte, Brazil
- Position: Forward

Senior career*
Years	Team	Apps	(Gls)
1981–1983	América Mineiro		
1983–1984	Atlético Mineiro		
1984	Atlético Paranaense		
1985	Grêmio Maringá		
1985	Villa Nova		
1985	Atlético Mineiro		
1986	Botafogo		
1987	Uberaba		
1987	Villa Nova		
1988	América Mineiro		
1988	Marília		
- * Club domestic league appearances and goals as of 18 March 2024

Paulo Roberto Patricio de Souza (7 June 1960 – 5 December 2015), better known as Paulinho Kiss, was a Brazilian professional footballer who played as a forward.

== Career ==
Top scorer in the Campeonato Mineiro in 1983, Paulinho Kiss received his nickname because he was a big fan of the band Kiss, and went to the show that took place in Belo Horizonte in 1953, at Mineirão, the stadium in which he scored the 100th goal milestone. He was champion in 1985 with Atlético Mineiro.

== Honours ==
Atlético Mineiro

- Campeonato Mineiro: 1983, 1985

Individual

- 1983 Campeonato Mineiro top scorer: 13 goals

== Death ==
Paulinho died after being hospitalized for a week, after falling ill in his tractor parts store, in the Nova Floresta neighborhood, Belo Horizonte.
