= Paulo César Martin =

Brazilian journalist, radio host, and podcaster (1964–2026)

- Born: 1964
- Died: September 15, 2026 (aged 62); São Paulo, Brazil
- Resting place: São Caetano do Sul, São Paulo, Brazil
- Other names: Pauleta, Paulão
- Occupations: Journalist; radio host; podcaster
- Employer(s): Folha de S.Paulo; Notícias Populares; Conrad Editora; UOL; TV Globo; Gazeta FM; Rádio Brasil 2000 FM; Rádio Antenazero
- Known for: Co-creator of Garagem radio program

Paulo César Martin (1964 – 15 September 2026), also known as Pauleta or Paulão, was a Brazilian journalist, radio host and podcaster. Based in Sāo Paulo, he co-created the alternative rock radio program Garagem, which was broadcast from 1992 to 2013. During his career, he worked for several Brazilian media organizations, including Folha de S.Paulo, Notícias Populares, TV Globo, Conrad Editora and UOL. At the time of his death, he was a presenter at Rádio Antenazero.

== Early career and print journalism ==
Martin began his career in print journalism, working as a reporter and editor at Folha de S.Paulo and later joining the staff of Notícias Populares. He also held editorial positions at Editora Conrad and worked as a journalist for the online portal UOL.

== Television and radio ==
Martin later worked in television production at TV Globo. In 1992, he co-created the radio program Garagem with other journalists, including André Barcinski. The program initially aired on Gazeta FM before moving to Brasil 2000 FM. It focused on alternative and underground rock, independent artists, music criticism and interviews. Garagem remained on the air until 2013.

== Later career and death ==
In his later years, Martin worked in radio and digital audio. He joined Rádio Antenazero, where he presented the music programs Pauleta 80/90 and The Beauties of the Afternoon (Os Belos da Tarde) and hosted a weekly podcast, ABFP (Alvaro, Barcinski, Forastieri, and Pauleta).

Martin was hospitalized in São Paulo in September 2026 after developing sudden medical complications. He died of pneumonia on 15 September, at the age of 62, after a 12-hour hospitalization. His funeral and burial took place in São Caetano do Sul, in the São Paulo metropolitan area.
