= Teatro Dermeval Gonçalves =

Theatre in São Paulo, Brazil

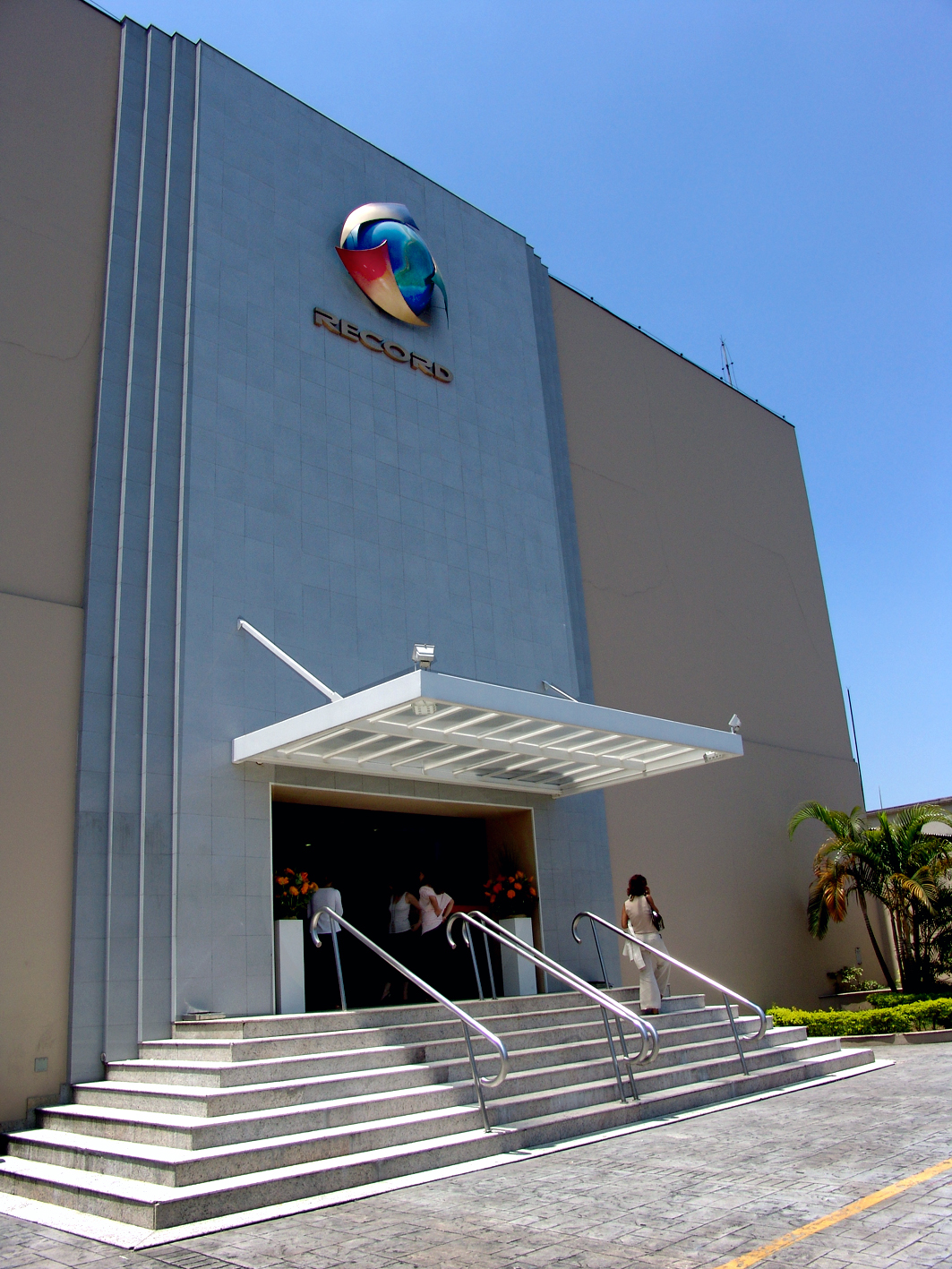
- The theatre, still called Teatro Record, in 2006
- Interactive map of the Teatro Dermeval Gonçalves area

General information
- Location: R. da Várzea, 200; Várzea da Barra Funda, São Paulo, Brazil
- Coordinates: 23°31′29.26″S 46°39′41.19″W

Teatro Dermeval Gonçalves (formerly Teatro Record) is a theatre in São Paulo, Brazil.
