= Paulo Machado de Carvalho =

Brazilian lawyer

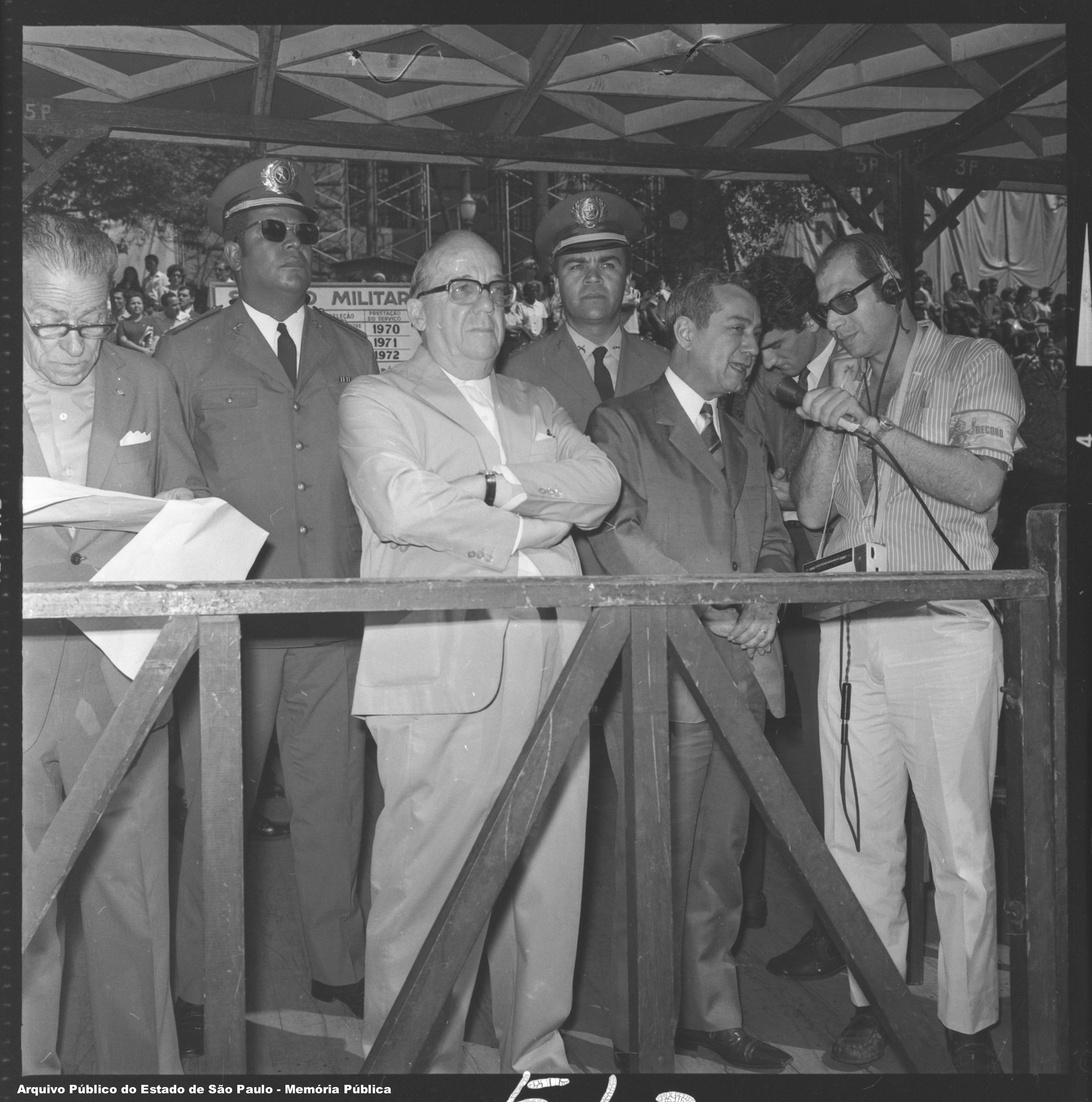
- Born: Paulo Machado de Carvalho; 9 November 1901; São Paulo, Brazil
- Died: 7 March 1992 (aged 90); São Paulo, Brazil
- Education: Law School, University of São Paulo
- Occupations: Businessman, journalist, president of São Paulo FC (1940, 1946–47)
- Years active: 1930s–1970s
- Notable credit: Founder of Rádio Record
- Relatives: Marcelino de Carvalho (brother), Paulo Machado de Carvalho Filho, Antônio Augusto Amaral de Carvalho (sons)

Paulo Machado de Carvalho (9 November 1901 – 7 March 1992), was a Brazilian businessman, journalist and football chairman.

== Biography ==
Graduated from Faculdade do Largo São Francisco, Paulo Machado de Carvalho assumed a prominent position in the 1932 Constitutionalist Revolution, where he was patron and founder of Rádio Sociedade Record, based near Praça da República. He participated in the first radio news broadcasts in Brazil alongside Assis Chateaubriand. In 1944, he acquired Rádio Panamericana, now Jovem Pan. In 1953, he participated in the founding of Rede Record television. Carvalho was the first businessman to organize a media conglomerate in Brazil, years before Roberto Marinho and Grupo Globo.

Paulo Machado de Carvalho also worked in his sporting career, being part of the board of São Paulo FC since 1934, and being elected president in 1940 and 1947. He was also the head of the Brazil national football team delegation in the 1958 and 1962 FIFA World Cups. responsible for making Brazil's blue away shirt official, chosen by him to be worn in the final against Sweden in 1958 because it represents the mantle of Our Lady of Aparecida, the country's patron saint. Its name gives the official name of the Estádio do Pacaembu since 1961.
