= Record (TV network) =

Brazilian commercial television network

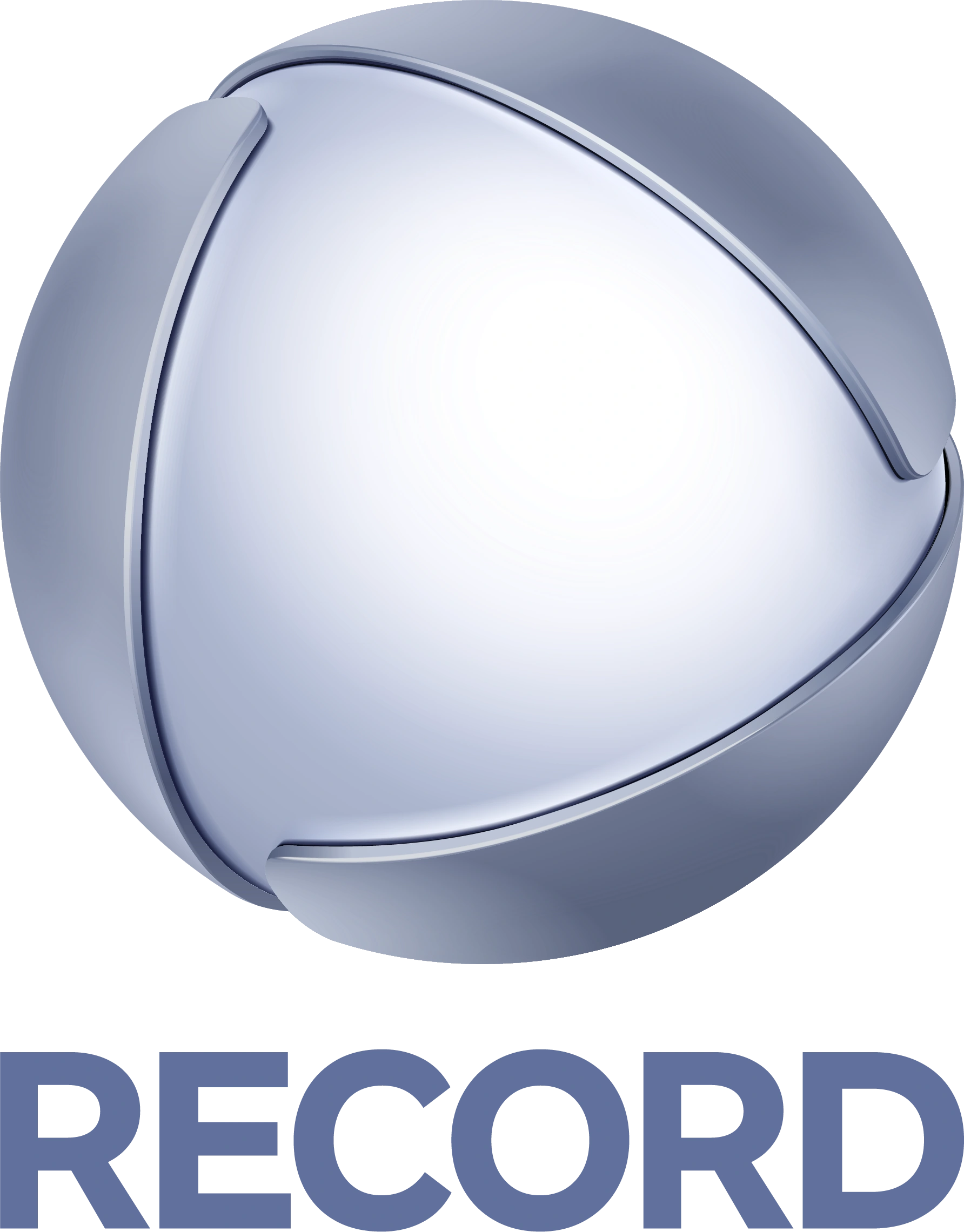
- Type: Free-to-air; Commercial broadcasting Television network
- Country: Brazil
- Stations: Record Belém; Record Brasília; Record Bahia Itabuna; Record Goiás; Record Interior RJ; Record Interior SP; Record Bahia; Record Litoral e Vale; Record Manaus; Record Minas; Record Paulista; Record Rio; Record Rio Preto; Record Guaíba; Record São Paulo
- Headquarters: São Paulo, Brazil

Programming
- Language: Portuguese
- Picture format: 1080i HDTV (downscaled to 480i for the SD feed)

Ownership
- Owner: Edir Macedo
- Parent: Grupo Record
- Key people: Edir Macedo (chairman), Luiz Cláudio Costa (president)
- Sister channels: Record Internacional; Record News

History
- Launched: 27 September 1953; 73 years ago
- Founder: Paulo Machado de Carvalho
- Former names: TV Record (1953–1990); Rede Record (1990–2016); RecordTV (2016–2023)

Links
- Website: record.r7.com

Availability

Terrestrial
- Digital terrestrial television: 14 UHF (Franca); 17 UHF (Itabuna); 18 UHF (Goiânia); 20 UHF (São Paulo); 21 UHF (Porto Alegre and Salvador); 22 UHF (Belém); 23 UHF (Brasília); 27 UHF (Bauru); 28 UHF (Belo Horizonte and Ribeirão Preto); 33 UHF (Santos); 35 UHF (Manaus); 39 UHF (Rio de Janeiro); 42 UHF (São José do Rio Preto); 43 UHF (Maceió)

Record (stylized in uppercase; Portuguese: [ʁeˈkɔʁ]), formerly known as Rede Record and RecordTV, is a Brazilian free-to-air television network. It is the second largest commercial TV station in Brazil, and the 28th largest in the world rankings as of 2012. In 2010, it was elected by the advertising market as the fifth largest station in the world in revenues and the eighth largest network in physical structure. In June 2021, it ranked second among the most watched channels in the country in the National Television Panel, only behind TV Globo.

As the main member of the media company Grupo Record, the network is headquartered in São Paulo, where most of its programming is also generated at the Dermeval Gonçalves Theater, and has a branch in Rio de Janeiro, where its telenovelas and other formats are produced at the Casablanca Estúdios (RecNov) complex. Its national coverage is achieved by retransmission from 111 stations, 15 of which are owned by the company and 96 of which are affiliate stations.

The station was inaugurated in the city of São Paulo on 27 September 1953, by businessman Paulo Machado de Carvalho, owner until then of a radio conglomerate, through a concession obtained in November 1950, the year television was launched in Brazil. TV Record was the fourth station to operate in the country after TV Tupi São Paulo (1950), TV Tupi Rio de Janeiro (1951) and TV Paulista (1952).

During the 1960s, the channel became popular, even leading in audience with the exhibition of music festivals including MPB and Jovem Guarda. In this period, Record headed the Rede de Emissoras Independentes (REI), a chain that integrated stations from various locations in Brazil. In the 1970s, the businessman and TV host Silvio Santos acquired half of the channel's shares through a partnership with Machado de Carvalho. In 1989, Record, after being under unfavorable financial situation in the second half of that decade, was sold to Bishop Edir Macedo, founder and leader of the Universal Church of the Kingdom of God.

The new acquisition spurred major investments in the structure of the station, which in the 1990s formed its national network with purchases of channels and affiliations, resulting in its positioning, from 2007 to 2015, as the country's second largest network in audience and revenues until it was overtaken by SBT until May 2024. As of 2012, both stations began to intensely dispute point tenths and take turns in the IBOPE ranking.

== History ==
=== Background ===
Only two months after the arrival of television in Brazil, businessman and communicator Paulo Machado de Carvalho got a permit to operate a new TV channel in the city of São Paulo on 22 November 1950, being granted channel 7 as its frequency. At the time, Paulo and his family already owned a large conglomerate of radio stations and took advantage of the name of his then Rádio Sociedade Record to baptize his first television channel; it was decided that the new station would be called TV Record.

Setting up the station, modern equipment was provided from the United States and installed in its studios on Miruna Avenue, in the Moema neighborhood, South Zone of São Paulo. Before going on the air, the channel made some experimental broadcasts months before its inauguration, showing the choir of the Escola Normal Caetano de Campos and the orchestra of the São Paulo Public Force.

It was initially set to start on 7 September 1953, Brazil's Independence Day, coinciding with the VHF frequency, channel 7, and also the last number of Paulo Machado de Carvalho's banknotes worth Cr$5 to Cr$1,000, all ending in 7, which he never used for transactions. This was Paulo Machado's lucky number, which was also the last number of the license plates of the vehicles of the other assets he owned. However, some of the imported equipment would only arrive after the initial planned date, forcing the station to wait an extra twenty days to formalize its launch, which had to include the number 7 in the date.

Test broadcasts started on the morning of 27 September 1953, at 9am, with the station airing a soccer match between Corinthians and Guarani at the Pacaembu stadium (which was eventually renamed Paulo Machado de Carvalho Stadium). The transmitter was assembled by Emissoras Unidas, Paulo Machado's media conglomerate, most of its launch day at the studios was used to rehearse and set up the stage for the inaugural musical special, which would formally open the station.

=== Launch and first years ===
The channel went on air on 27 September 1953, at 8:53 pm. In the first image to be shown by the station, the artist couple Blota Júnior and Sônia Ribeiro descended a staircase and announced the launch of TV Record. After Blota made a speech, a show started with Dorival Caymmi, Inezita Barroso, Adoniran Barbosa, Isaura Garcia, Pagano Sobrinho, Randal Juliano, Enrico Simonetti's orchestra and several dancers. This musical attraction was presented by Sandra Amaral and Hélio Ansaldo.

In its early operations, the station aired musical (among which, with celebrities such as Nat King Cole, Charles Aznavour, Ella Fitzgerald and Marlene Dietrich), sports, theater, humorous and informative programs. In 1954, the first serial produced in Brazil, Capitão 7, starring Ayres Campos and Idalina de Oliveira, went on the air, remaining until 1966. In 1954, the program Mesa Redonda was created, hosted by Geraldo José de Almeida and Raul Tabajara. In 1955, Grande Gincana Kibon went on the air, being shown for sixteen years.

=== 1959–67: Emissoras Unidas ===
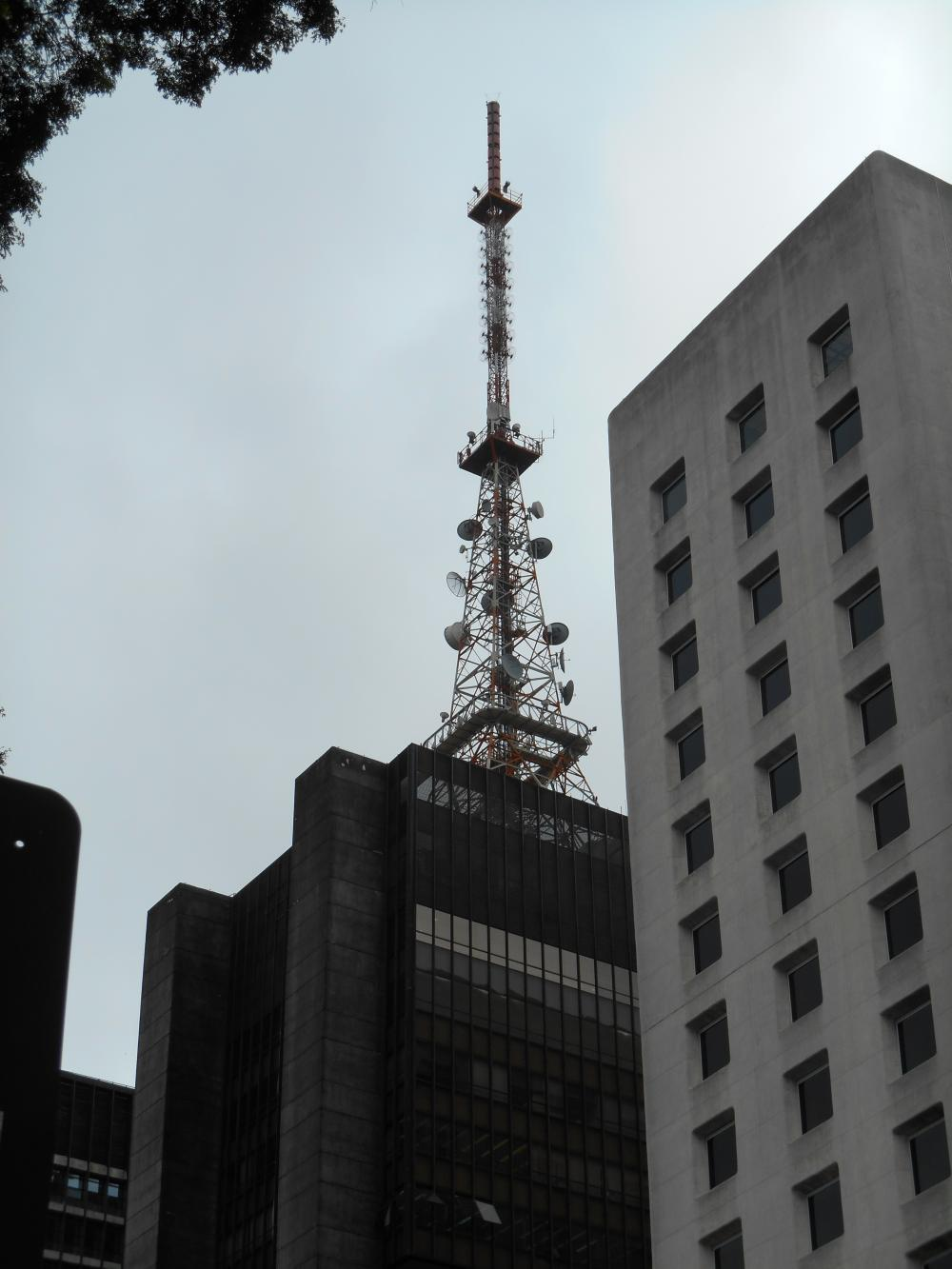
The Grande Avenida Tower, in Paulista Avenue, in São Paulo, is used by Record to transmit its signal in the city and the Metropolitan Region.

==== Early growth ====
With the rapid growth of his new media vehicle, Paulo Machado de Carvalho joined his brother-in-law João Batista do Amaral to establish a partnership between São Paulo's TV Record and Rio's TV Rio (then channel 13 in Rio de Janeiro), originating the Rede Unidas de Televisão (or Rede das Emissoras Unidas) in 1955. With the creation of the new network, a link was built between the cities of Rio de Janeiro and São Paulo that allowed the connection via UHF signal between Record and TV Rio. It was through this link that TV Record broadcast the Brazilian Turf Grand Prix, directly from the Jockey Club in Rio de Janeiro; the link between the two stations also made it possible to exchange productions between them. With this, Emissoras Unidas would get affiliates and retransmissions throughout Brazil under the leadership of the headquarters of both TV Rio and TV Record.

==== Regular programming and pioneering in Brazilian television ====
In 1958, the first regular program produced by Record and TV Rio was launched, Show 713 (alluding to Record's channel 7 and Rio's channel 13), a program in which the slots were divided in half, with each side belonging to each station. The program featured interviews, news reports and musical numbers from the two stations' hometowns. Record ended the 1950s by inaugurating its Teatro Record on Rua da Consolação, which would later be used for musical presentations and program recordings.

The station entered the 1960s by pioneering the inauguration of the new federal capital Brasilia, becoming the only TV station outside the new city to broadcast the event, which included interviews with several Brazilian politicians at the time, including then-president Juscelino Kubitschek.

==== Fires and prestiged programs ====
The station's headquarters in Moema would come to suffer a fire in May 1960, causing Rede Unidas to air more programs from the co-generator TV Rio while Record recovered. It was the first of a series of six fires that Machado de Carvalho family's channel would face, the most serious being in July 1966, where several reels of archival tapes were lost. Despite these bad times, the station managed to achieve great prestige by showing several programs during the 1960s, especially music programs such as O Fino da Bossa and the classic MPB Festivals where several renowned artists such as Gilberto Gil, Caetano Veloso, Chico Buarque, Elis Regina, among others, performed amidst the strong military dictatorship in the country.

==== Competition ====
With the emergence of TV Globo and the growth of its rival TV Tupi, Record's audience gradually decreased. However, the station was able to launch a few more audience hits, such as Família Trapo with Ronald Golias and Jô Soares, and the news program Repórter Esso. The Teatro Record in Consolação suffers a fire that forces Record to transfer the São Paulo headquarters to Augusta Street, closer to downtown São Paulo.

=== 1969–89: Decline and Silvio Santos phase ===
Record logo in the 70s

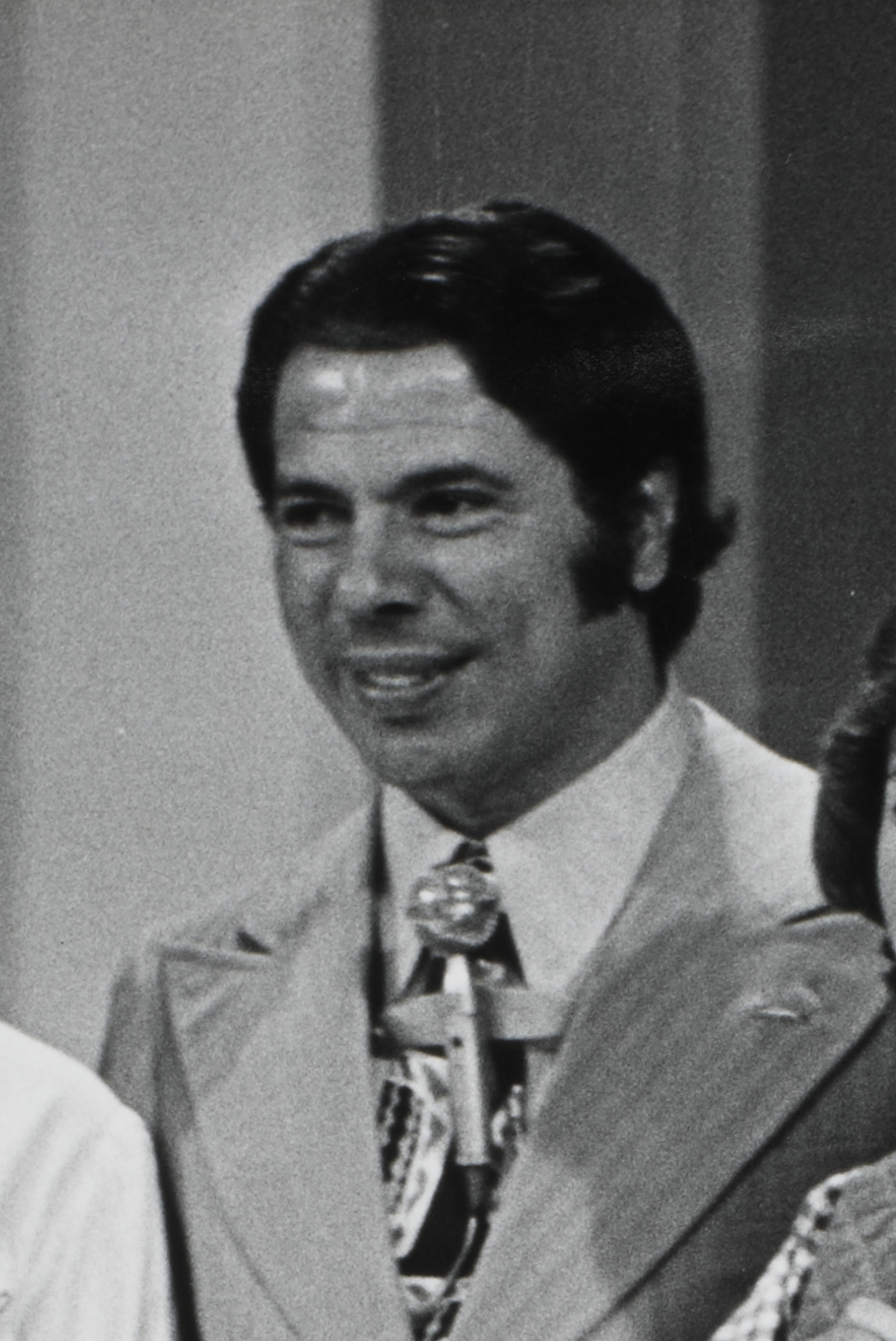
The businessman and television presenter Silvio Santos was co-manager of the network in the 1970s.

==== The founding of REI and the participation of Silvio Santos ====
Due to disagreements between the directors of TV Rio and Record (because the Rio de Janeiro channel had acquired productions from Tupi, which was then a rival of the Machado de Carvalho family station), the Emissoras Unidas was extinguished in 1967. Later, however, the two stations reconnected and founded the Rede de Emissoras Independentes, which became known by the acronym REI. Immediately after this, businessman Silvio Santos acquires half of Record and uses it to show some of his programs (since the entertainer had lost space on other television channels). Despite initially not agreeing, the former owners of Record end up accepting the agreement for Silvio to co-operate the station.

By this time, TV Record had considerably lost its audience to TV Tupi, Rede Globo, and the recently established Rede Bandeirantes, owned by João Saad. Shortly afterwards, TV Rio was disconnected from the Emissoras Independentes, leaving REI with only Record as its sole channel. REI would later broadcast the 1970 FIFA World Cup directly from Mexico, marking the first World Cup to be transmitted by Record. The channel also brings its casts of artists, particularly the famous comedian and entertainer, Chacrinha.

However, due to the decline that was gradually affecting Record, the channel decided to sell its theater in Rua Augusta in downtown São Paulo. Meanwhile, Silvio Santos inaugurates a new TV channel in Rio de Janeiro called TVS (channel 11) and starts to exchange productions of this station with Record, ending with the joint simulcast premiere of Programa Silvio Santos on TVS and Tupi in 1976, ending a 10-year stint with Globo. In 1978, Paulo Machado de Carvalho acquired concessions to operate two more television channels for TV Record: channel 4 in Franca and channel 7 in São José do Rio Preto, making it a statewide network. Two years later, with Tupi's shutdown, Programa Silvio Santos, by now produced in São Paulo, moved to Record.

==== Concessions and the departure of Santos ====
Silvio Santos won some concessions from the former broadcaster from the federal government and founded his own television network, SBT, in 1981, on part of the former Rede Tupi stations and studios. The businessman and entertainer, together with Paulo Machado, starts managing channel 9 in Rio de Janeiro (which had also won the bidding process), which was transformed into TV Record Rio de Janeiro in 1982, becoming the channel's fourth TV station (since the other two stations in the countryside of the state already existed, besides the headquarters in São Paulo). Both stations belonged to the now relapsed Rede de Emissoras Independentes, which until then had a very low audience. It was the channel's next attempt to go national.

After SBT was founded, in 1981, TV Record São Paulo became a second plan for Silvio Santos, but the Machado de Carvalho family, co-owners of the channel, insisted on investing in the small station. In 1983, the program Especial Sertanejo premiered hosted by Marcelo Costa promoting Brazilian country music while journalism remained the station's flagship with the premiere of Jornal da Noite, which scored a victory for the network with a 2-hour broadcast nationwide - more than the competition. In 1985, SBT was nationally consolidated when it debuted its national network programming via satellite for all of Brazil, through Brasilsat, Embratel's exclusive channel. In 1986, Record broadcast its second World Cup in a pool with SBT directly from Mexico. In 1987, at the same time that Programa Silvio Santos stopped being shown on Record (and started being shown only by SBT), Silvio Santos stopped injecting 70% to 80% of his participation in TV Record of São Paulo, and thus forced the Machados, thru Paulo, to give up channel 9, which later rebranded to TV Copacabana with a tourism approach.

==== The end of REI and ostracism ====
In 1989, the then-Rede de Emissoras Independentes that still continued to be led by TV Record de São Paulo succumbs to its crisis and is extinguished. With this, the channel fell into ostracism and Record became a local station again, leaving only the station in São Paulo and the other two in the interior of the state, since channel 9 in Rio de Janeiro had become TV Corcovado, which would later be owned by CNT to become CNT Rio de Janeiro.

==== Sale to Edir Macedo ====
With Record already suffering a serious crisis and on the verge of bankruptcy, Silvio Santos convinces Paulo Machado de Carvalho to put the station up for sale. Until that time, besides the very low audience, the channel had annual revenues of $2.5 million, but had debts that exceeded $20 million.

Beginning in 1988, interest for a potential buyer emerged. One of the first candidates was print conglomerate Grupo Abril, who tried bidding for a network during the auction of the Tupi licenses. In May of that year, the group offered US$14 million to try acquiring the assets that were owned by the Machado de Carvalho family.

Soon after learning about the sale of the channel, the leader of the UCKG, Edir Macedo, became interested in buying Rede Record. At the time, he was in the United States and learned about the sale of the station from his lawyer Paulo Roberto Guimarães. Macedo appointed pastor Laprovita Vieira to be the intermediary of the purchase of Record. Laprovita had a meeting with Demerval Gonçalves, representative of Silvio Santos and Paulo Machado de Carvalho, at the station's old headquarters in the Moema district of São Paulo; the negotiation was quick. Besides TV Record, Edir Macedo also acquired Rádio Record, which, like the television channel, was in bad shape and also belonged to Machado de Carvalho's family and to Grupo Silvio Santos.

A meeting was held with lawyers from both parties, which was attended by Laprovita, Edir, Silvio Santos and his partner Paulo Machado de Carvalho. The requested amount was accepted by both parties, both Edir Macedo and Silvio Santos' representative. Days later, Silvio Santos regretted the sale, but he was aware of Record's precarious situation and had no other way out, since both he and Paulo Machado de Carvalho were still unable to pay Record's debts. Some creditors threatened to file for bankruptcy for the chaotic situation the channel was in.

After the sale, it was rumored that Record would become a channel with completely religious programming which would be used by UCKG, founded by Edir Macedo. However, this did not actually happen, but until today, the station shows some evangelical programs, especially in the early morning hours. The new directors of the station after the purchase, together with Macedo, decided to continue the station's commercial activities.

The deal led to the creation of Central Record de Comunicação (now Grupo Record) in 1989, which became the main media conglomerate controlled by Macedo himself, which today includes, besides Record and Rádio Record, the portal R7, Record Entretenimento, and later Record News.

=== 1990–2007: Growth and investment ===
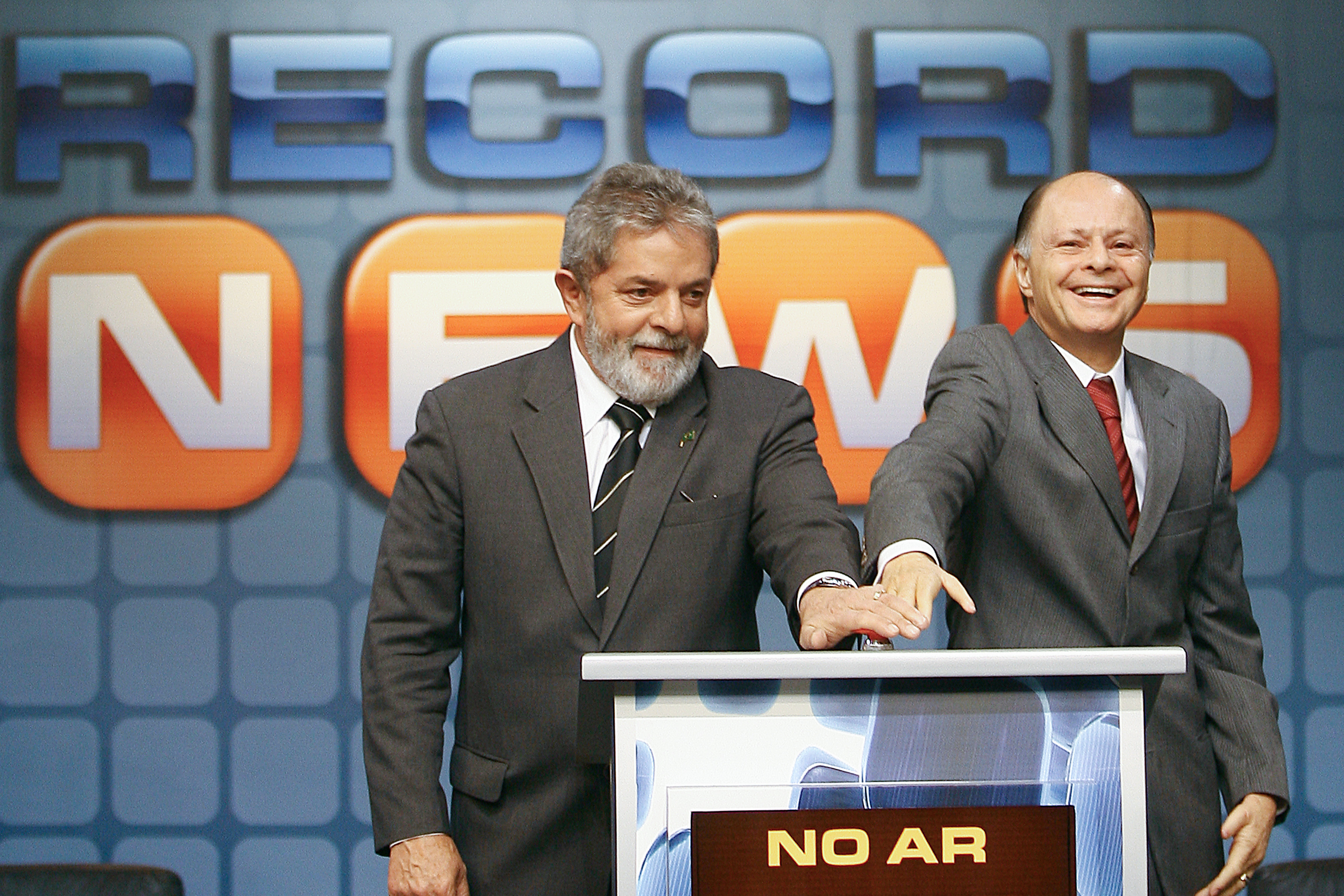
Lula and Edir Macedo at the opening ceremony of Record News

==== Restructuring ====
After its sale, TV Record went through drastic changes: a new visual identity was presented in July 1990 and a reformulation in its programs that managed to recover its lost audience. The station started its national expansion when it began transmitting its signal via the BrasilSat A2 satellite, also distributing its programming to satellite dishes. Contacts were made with TV Rio and TV Corcovado in Rio de Janeiro, TV Capital in Brasília, TV Guaíba in Porto Alegre, TV Minas in Belo Horizonte and a group of four stations in the state of Paraná owned by the same businessman. The channel became Rede Record and began to acquire its own stations, affiliates and retransmitters for renewed expansion. In 1992, Record finally resumed broadcasts to Rio de Janeiro for the first time since 1986-87, using the license used by the second TV Rio, coincidentally an affiliate of Record under Unidas.

In 1995, the station moved to its current headquarters in Barra Funda by acquiring the CBI studios, which was very modern for its time. The acquisition also included its technical equipment, including come Betacam cameras, editing units and OB vans. Despite the acquisition, Record did not finish its move to Barra Funda in July 1998, when it definitively left its former headquarters in the Miruna building in the Moema neighborhood after 45 years. During this period, the company hired several artists to fill its programming line-up, with several artists such as Eliana, Raul Gil, Gilberto Barros, Ratinho (until 1998, now with SBT), Milton Neves and others becoming famous. Record was able to reach third place in the national audience, surpassing Band and the struggling Rede Manchete.

In October 2000, the network appointed Giusti-Loducca as its public relations agency and hired Adriane Galisteu (formerly of RedeTV!) to front É Show, a variety show that premiered on 30 October. In addition, there was also a raft of new titles, mostly from Sony Pictures Entertainment's catalog, as well as the film Lolita, which was an erotic drama with sex scenes. Its new telenovela, Vidas Cruzadas, was set to premiere in November, and had scenes shot in Recife. With these moves, Record attempted to distance itself from its public image as "the bishop's network", by airing certain programs that were seen as being incompatible with the UCKG's norms, giving the notion that Record is a commercial network. The network also planned a new slogan, which was part of the advertising contract.

==== New slogan and further expansion ====
In 2004, the network decided to bet on a new phase aiming for more ratings. With the slogan On the way to leadership, Record begins to expand its offer by producing renowned programs, new IDs, and telenovelas that became popular. Among the successes of this new phase, the productions A Escrava Isaura, Prova de Amor, Vidas Opostas and Caminhos do Coração (which was divided into three seasons due to its huge audience) stood out.

On 27 September 2007, Record News, the first free-to-air news channel on Brazilian television, was inaugurated, occupying the signal of the former Rede Mulher, though it was already owned by Grupo Record 13 years prior. On the day of the foundation of Record News, the governor of the state of São Paulo José Serra, the mayor of the city of São Paulo Gilberto Kassab, the then president of Record Alexandre Raposo, the owner Edir Macedo and the president of the Republic Luiz Inácio Lula da Silva were present. The inauguration ceremony of the new channel was broadcast by Rede Record inside Jornal da Record, as well as Record News itself.

==== Competition with Globo and SBT ====
In 2007, Rede Record was able to overtake SBT to become the second largest Brazilian television station, only remaining behind Rede Globo. However, in some programs, it was able to overtake Globo. In cities such as Goiânia, Belém, and Fortaleza, its news magazine, Domingo Espectacular, surpassed Rede Globo's Fantástico, and Record's morning news program, Fala Brasil, was able to surpass Bom Dia Brasil in São Paulo. On 11 December 2009, Record managed to top first place in Rio during the broadcast of The Elite Squad.

=== 2010–15: Redesign ===
==== Helicopter crash and rescue ====
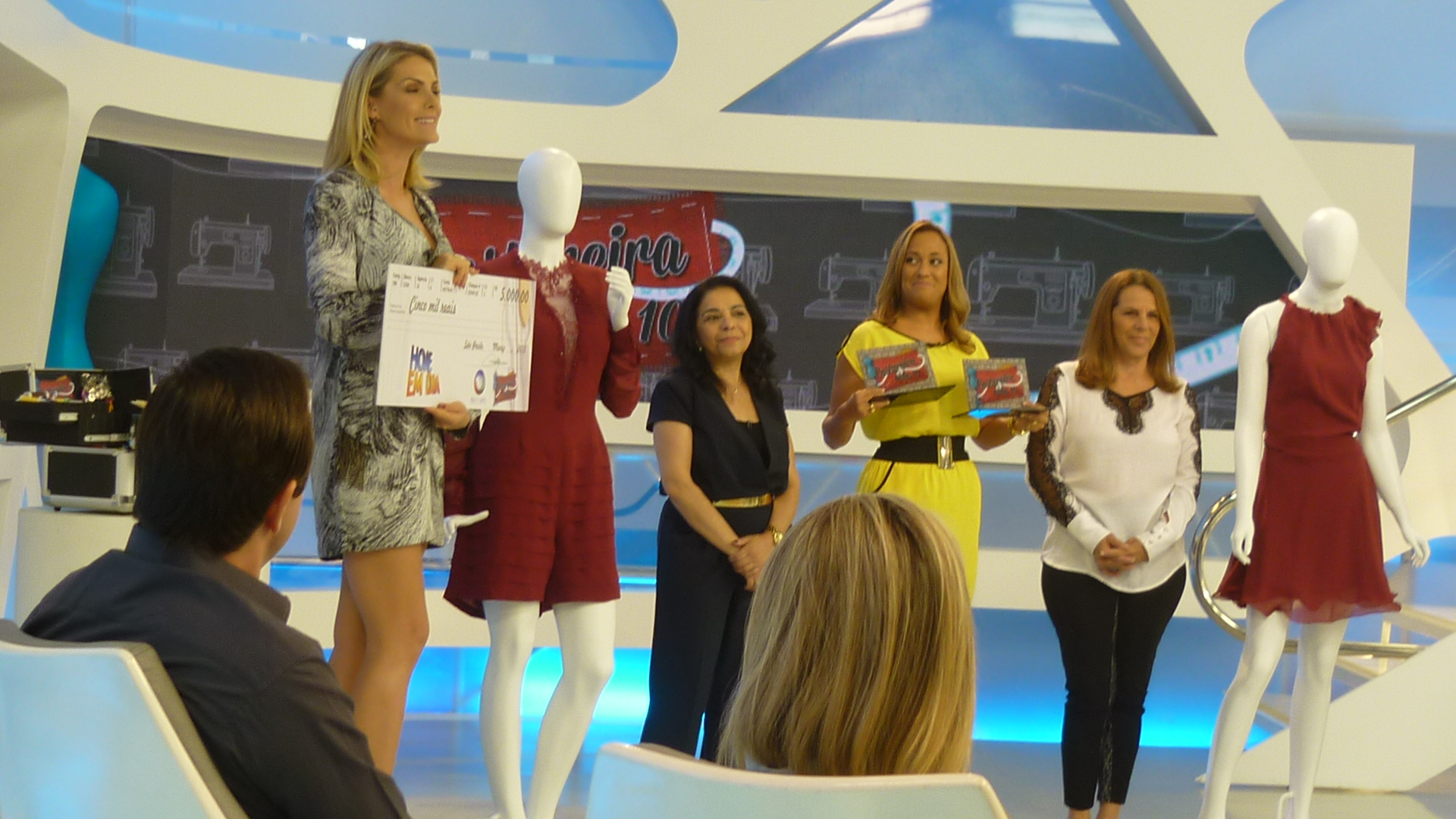
Recording the program Hoje em Dia in 2015

In early 2010, a Record helicopter crashed inside the Jockey Club in São Paulo after suffering a breakdown. The aircraft was in that region to cover a robbery that had occurred in the Morumbi neighborhood, South Zone of São Paulo. The pilot of the helicopter, Rafael Delgado Sobrinho, died on the spot and cameraman Alexandre Silva de Moura "Borracha" was taken in serious condition to hospital; the two occupants were rescued by Globocop from TV Globo. Rede Record lamented the incident at the time and closed that night's Jornal da Record quietly with a moment of silence in honor of their deceased colleagues.

==== Olympic broadcast ====
In 2012, Record exclusively broadcast the 2012 Olympic Games in London and the unprecedented 2010 Winter Olympics in Vancouver. It was the first time that its rival Rede Globo was left out of the Olympics, though them and Rede Record, along with Rede Bandeirantes, would broadcast the Summer Olympics in 2016.

==== Reformulation and loss to SBT ====
In 2013, Record underwent a reformulation, which eventually resulted in the change of the network's top command. Alexandre Raposo was eventually fired and in his place Luiz Cláudio Costa came from TV Record Brasília to the position of president. Another important change in command was that of Honorilton Gonçalves, by Marcelo Silva in the position of vice president of Record. After spending 2012 without much profitability, the company hired a consulting service to reformulate its market strategies.

In 2014, SBT (which always held the second place position in Brazilian television until 2007) was able to take back second place, which shrunk Rede Record's position down to third place for the first time since 2007. However, Rede Record managed to keep its position as one of the top three Brazilian television networks.

In December 2015, it signed a new nine-year agreement with Universal Studios.

=== 2016–present: Rebranding ===
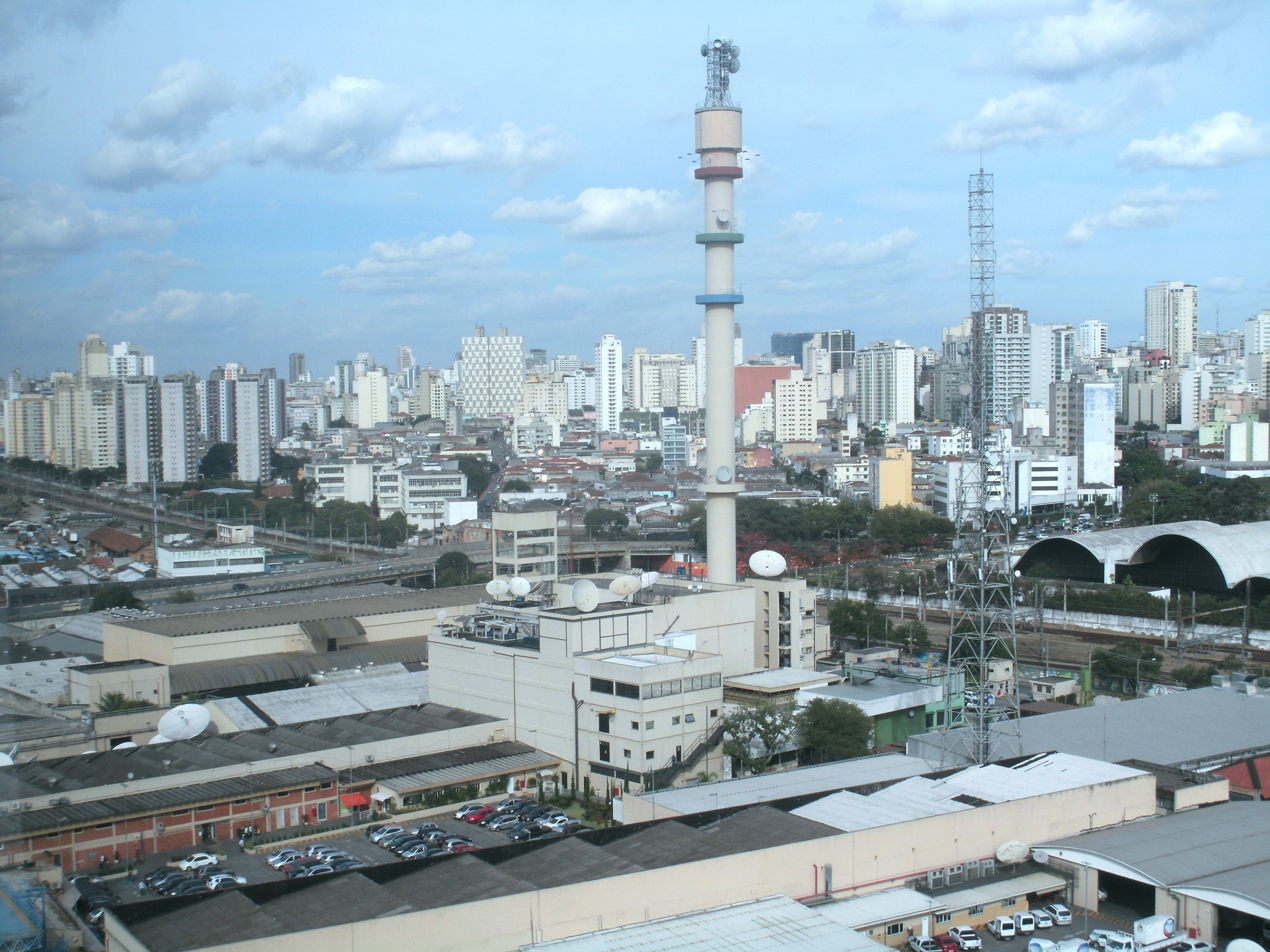
Headquarters of Record, in São Paulo

On 24 November 2016, Rede Record shortened its name to "RecordTV", introduced the new slogan "Reinventar é a nossa marca" ("Reinvention is our brand"), and introduced an updated logo—which replaced its historic red, green, and blue colors with silver and cool gray, and removed the map of South America from its inner globe. Grupo Record stated that the new logo was intended to symbolize its positioning as an "avant-garde", multi-platform broadcaster with an international presence.

On the morning of 8 October 2022, Record was the subject of a ransomware attack affecting many of the broadcaster's systems. The attack led to a disruption of programming, with its Saturday morning program Fala Brasil replaced by reruns of Everybody Hates Chris until operations were restored. SBT and TV Cultura had also faced ransomware attacks the same day.

On 6 November 2023, as part of the network's 70th anniversary, RecordTV underwent another rebranding; it introduced a refined version of the 2016 logo (which has a metallic texture, more greyscale colors, and reshaped "fins" designed to make it resemble a play button in its negative space), and shortened its name to simply "Record".

On July 29, 2025, at approximately 19:33 local time, while the station was reporting on a shooting in Midtown Manhattan, the live feed—particularly affecting its digital YouTube stream—was abruptly cut off. The anonymous hijackers replaced the news coverage with a low-resolution creepypasta video originating from The Wyoming Incident, a well-known 2007 internet Alternate Reality Game (ARG) that centers around a fictional signal intrusion. The pirate broadcast featured jarring, distorted human faces, intense audio noise, and a series of cryptic subliminal text phrases in English, alongside the recurring sequence "333-333-333". The incident sparked widespread discussion across social media platforms regarding the ongoing vulnerabilities of internet-connected television streams.

== Programming ==
=== Telenovelas ===
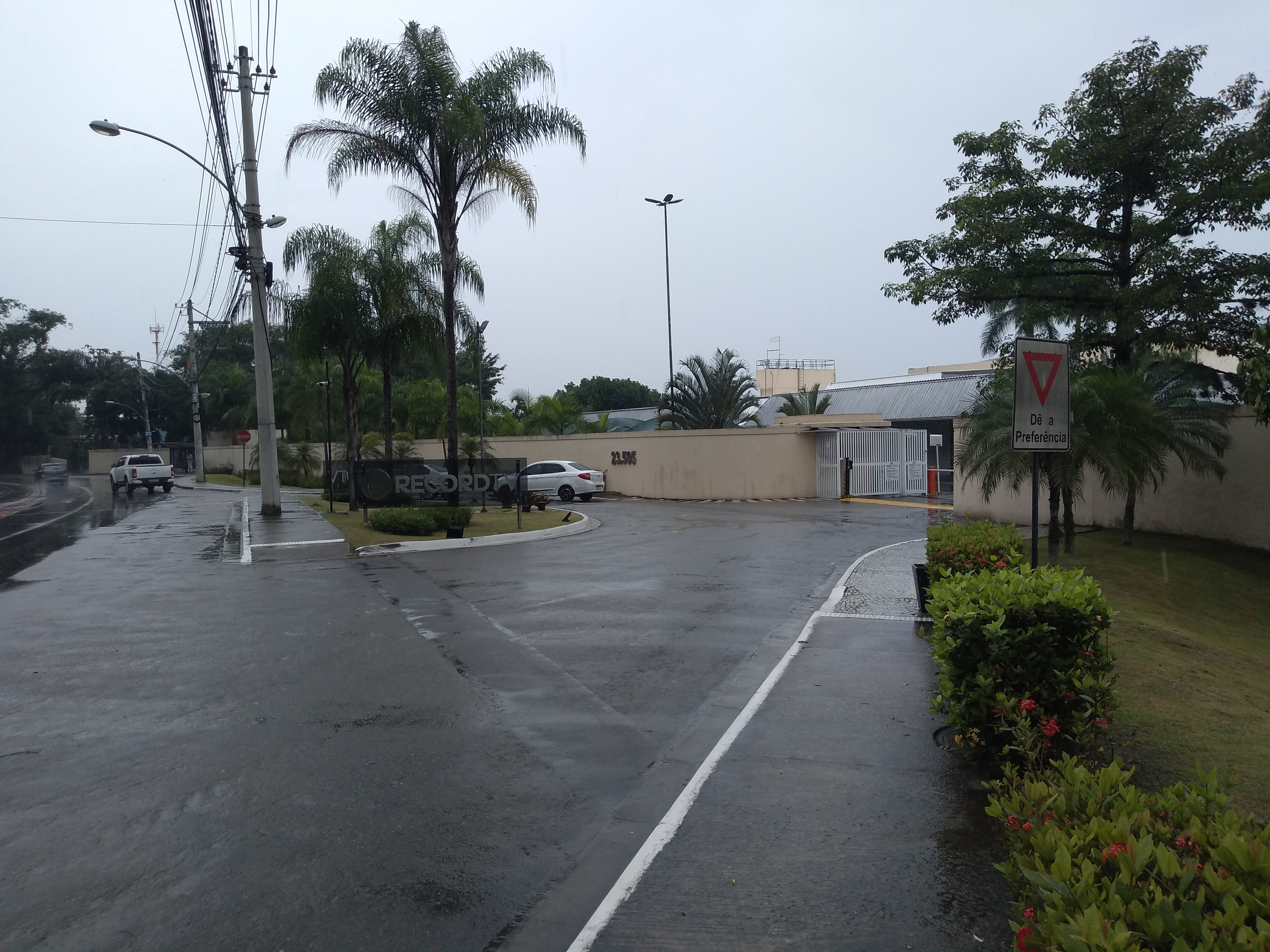
Entrance to the Casablanca Estúdios complex, in Rio de Janeiro

The first telenovela produced and aired by Record was the 1954 novella A Muralha. Between 1954 and 1977, the channel had produced seventy-eight telenovelas. In this first period, still in the era of Silvio Santos and Paulo Machado de Carvalho, the highlights were Os Deuses Estão Mortos and As Pupilas do Senhor Reitor, the latter being, according to Unicamp, the soap opera with the highest audience in Record's history. The last production of the network in this first phase was Meu Adorável Mendigo of 1974, a plot that closed the teledramaturgy core in the network, which was dismantled and the professionals dismissed after this period. In 1977, however, the network aired O Espantalho, a partnership with Ivani Ribeiro, who had started at the channel in 1954. Between 1999 and 2004, eight additional telenovelas were unassumingly produced, originating from Record's partnerships with independent companies.

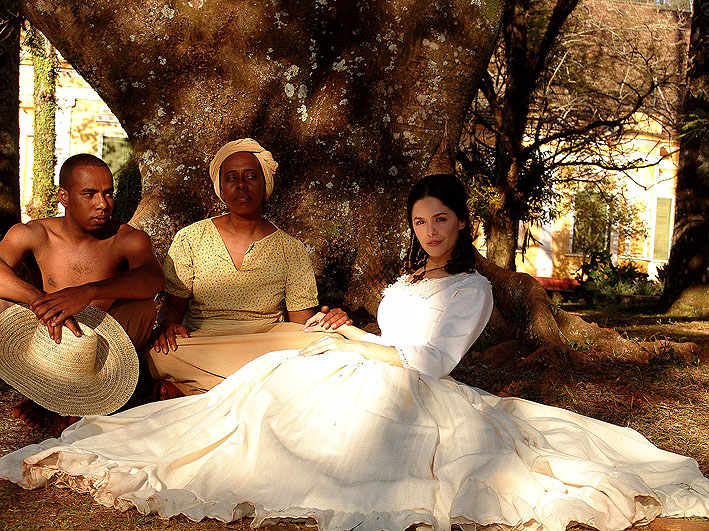
Bianca Rinaldi with the costume of the main character Isaura from the telenovela A Escrava Isaura

On 10 May 2004, Herval Rossano was hired as general director of teledramaturgy and began to guide the network in restructuring, promoting investment in the purchase of state-of-the-art equipment, new studios and expansion of the team, in addition to the acquisition of a cast of rising authors and new qualified actors. The director presented the proposal of seven plots by different authors before the choice of which one would restart dramaturgy at the network was made. Besides the debut telenovela of this new phase, A Escrava Isaura, several other productions stood out, such as Vidas Opostas, Prova de Amor, Amor e Intrigas, Chamas da Vida and Caminhos do Coração.

In 2015, the plot Os Dez Mandamentos, the first biblical telenovela of the network and of Brazil, was produced. Os Dez Mandamentos was an immediate success and made history in Brazilian television. With the soap opera, the network broke an audience record by surpassing Globo's main soap opera for the first time in 40 years. With the success of the soap opera, Record TV decided in October 2015 that the 8:30 PM time slot would be dedicated only to biblical productions. The soap opera was also broadcast in several countries (such as in Argentina by Telefe).

On 19 January 2021, with the launch of the soap opera Gênesis, Record managed to beat its competitor in two capitals and make one of the most followed productions in the world.

=== Miniseries and series ===
Record TV has so far aired more than 20 series, serials and miniseries in its different phases, since the 1950s. Also, since the restart of the network's teledramaturgy core in October 2004, besides telenovelas, some series and miniseries have been produced, mostly with a biblical or police theme

== Revenue ==
According to Rede Record's vice president, in 2010, Rede Record had revenues of 2.7 billion reais, exactly 25% more than in 2009. In 2011, the network had revenues of 3.5 billion reais, and 1.72 billion reais in 2012.

== Coverage ==
Record has 15 owned-and-operated stations and 96 affiliated stations, for a total of 111 stations. It was one of the pioneers of digital television in Brazil.

=== International coverage ===
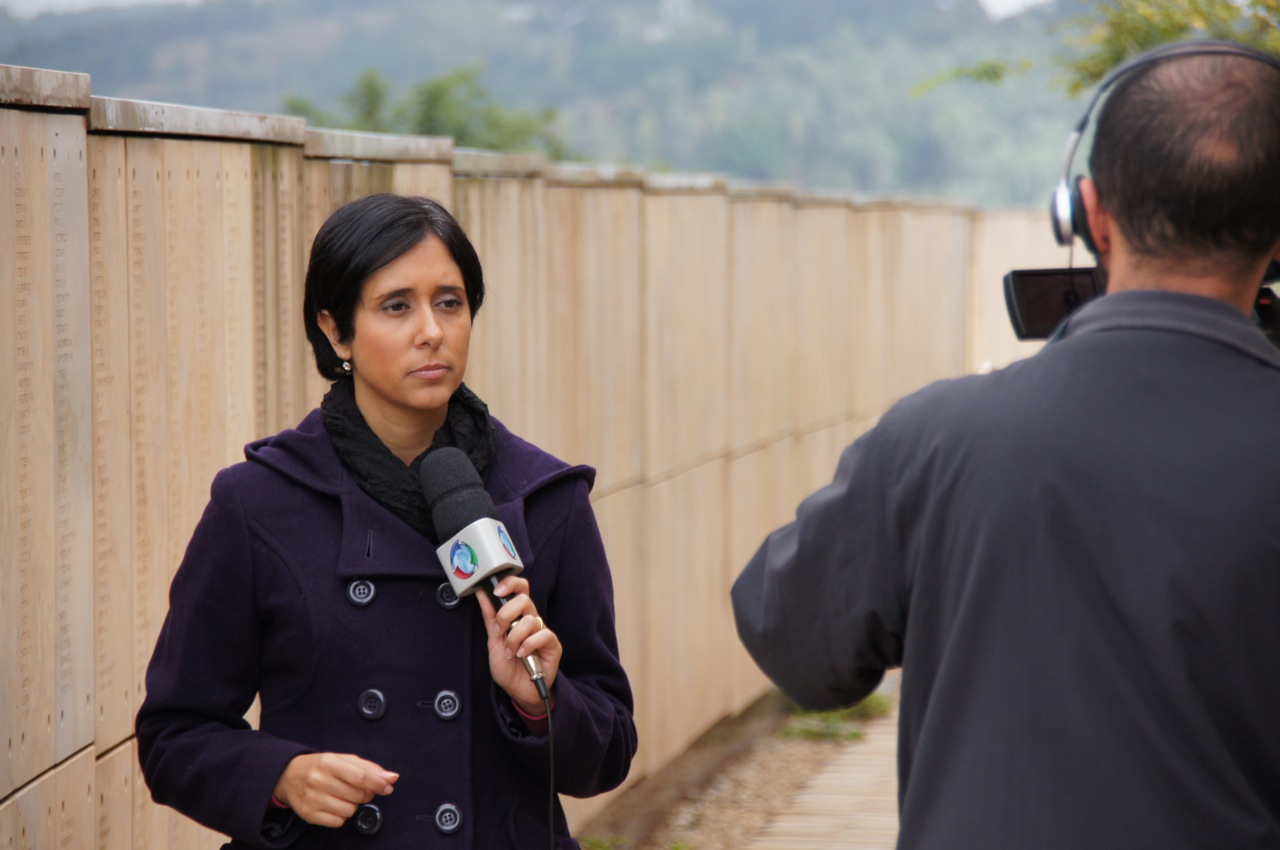
Journalist from Record TV during the recording of a news story in Pretoria, South Africa

Created in 2002, Record Internacional is present in 150 countries and carries programs that are successful in Brazil. Record Internacional contains six channels that carry a digital signal around the world, and 17 stations. The station is also an affiliate of CNN International.

In Africa, Record broadcasts to Mozambique, Uganda, Cape Verde, Guinea-Bissau and Madagascar. In Mozambique, TV Miramar, which is part of Record International, has 10 stations and has several local programs, which were successful. Additionally, the station also broadcasts to all of Asia, and this coverage is done by two satellites: Asiasat 2 and JSAT.

In the United States, coverage is provided by the NSS-806 and EchoStar satellites and is distributed by Comcast and the Dish Network. In Europe, Record is the only Brazilian television channel available without any subscription fees. Coverage reaches all countries on the continent.

== Controversies ==
=== Edir Macedo's control of Rede Record ===
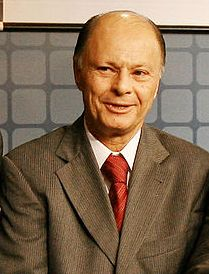
Edir Macedo in 2007

The sale of Record in 1989 to businessman Edir Macedo is still controversial; the Federal Police conducted an investigation in which they discovered that part of the money used by Macedo for the purchase of the station consisted of interest-free loans from his Universal Church. The leader of the UCKG was sentenced to pay a fine for not having declared this money. In 1992, the station's studios, still located in Moema, suffered another fire in which several documents related to the sale of Record were lost, causing the transaction to owe more satisfactory explanations.

That same year, Edir Macedo was arrested shortly after holding a service at the Templo Maior of the Universal Church in the Santo Amaro neighborhood of São Paulo on charges of charlatanism, stelionism, and injury to popular belief. The then-new owner of Record was jailed for 11 days and was released for lack of evidence, later getting rid of the charges. In late-1995, Macedo was once again the target of controversy when he appeared in a video recorded in 1990 by a former member of the UCKG and aired on TV Globo, where the spiritual leader appeared teaching other pastors to convince believers to donate money to his church. With the video becoming viral on the Internet, Macedo tried to petition the courts to have copies of the Globo report removed from YouTube, but had his request denied.

=== Money laundering ===
In 2008, the UCKG was accused of money laundering and its members, including Edir Macedo, were charged for gang formation. The case gained notoriety, mainly, because it was heavily aired again by Rede Globo in its national news program, Jornal Nacional. In response, In Jornal da Record, Rede Record presented several old accusations that Globo had alleged links in the result of the 1989 presidential elections and the military dictatorship. The case was later dismissed and Record again criticized Globo for not reporting Edir Macedo's innocence.

According to the Forbes magazine, Edir Macedo is the richest pastor in Brazil, with a net worth estimated in January 2013 at almost two billion reais. The Universal Church of the Kingdom of God and Edir Macedo contested and stated in a note that, although Rede Record is owned by him, Macedo would not be remunerated or participate in profits or any other financial resources coming from the station and that they would be reinvested in Record. His only sustenance would come from the church through the "per diem" paid to pastors and bishops by the institution and from the copyrights of the books he authored.

In 2007, the Folha de S.Paulo newspaper pointed out that Macedo was the largest holder of concessions in the Brazilian media, with 23 television stations, including Rede Record, and 40 radio stations, and that the conglomerate's financial extension, registered in the then tax haven of Jersey Island, would serve for "money laundering" of tithes received by the UCKG.

=== Relationship with the Universal Church ===
According to the investigation, at least 50 companies, such as radio and TV stations (especially Rede Record), printers and tourism agencies controlled directly or indirectly by members of the Universal Church of the Kingdom of God are benefited by donations made by believers of the UCKG throughout the country.

The Universal Church, along with Rede Record and Folha Universal, the main media outlets linked to the UCKG, have also had numerous editorial conflicts with several other media outlets in Brazil, among them the UOL portal, the Veja magazine, the Folha de S.Paulo newspaper and especially Rede Globo. Edir Macedo stated to IstoÉ's website that the Rio de Janeiro broadcaster is one of Universal's biggest enemies.

=== "Chute na santa" incident ===
At dawn on the holiday of 12 October 1995, the day of Our Lady of Aparecida, celebrated by Catholics, the program O Despertar da Fé, produced by the Universal Church, was aired on Rede Record. During the broadcast, the televangelist, Sérgio von Helder, kicked and hit an image of the Saint that he had bought. In addition to assaulting the image, Sergio stated that "God could not be compared to such an ugly, horrible and disgraceful 'doll'."

The following day, the incident was reported by Rede Globo during Jornal Nacional, causing great national repercussion. The fact was widely criticized not only by Catholics, but also by other religious groups, being reported as religious intolerance. At the time, Edir Macedo even offered space on Record to some Catholic leaders as an apology, but they refused. Later, Macedo claimed that he was suffering religious persecution from the media, especially from TV Globo, saying that Roberto Marinho's network had turned him into a "monster".

=== Accusations of political bias ===
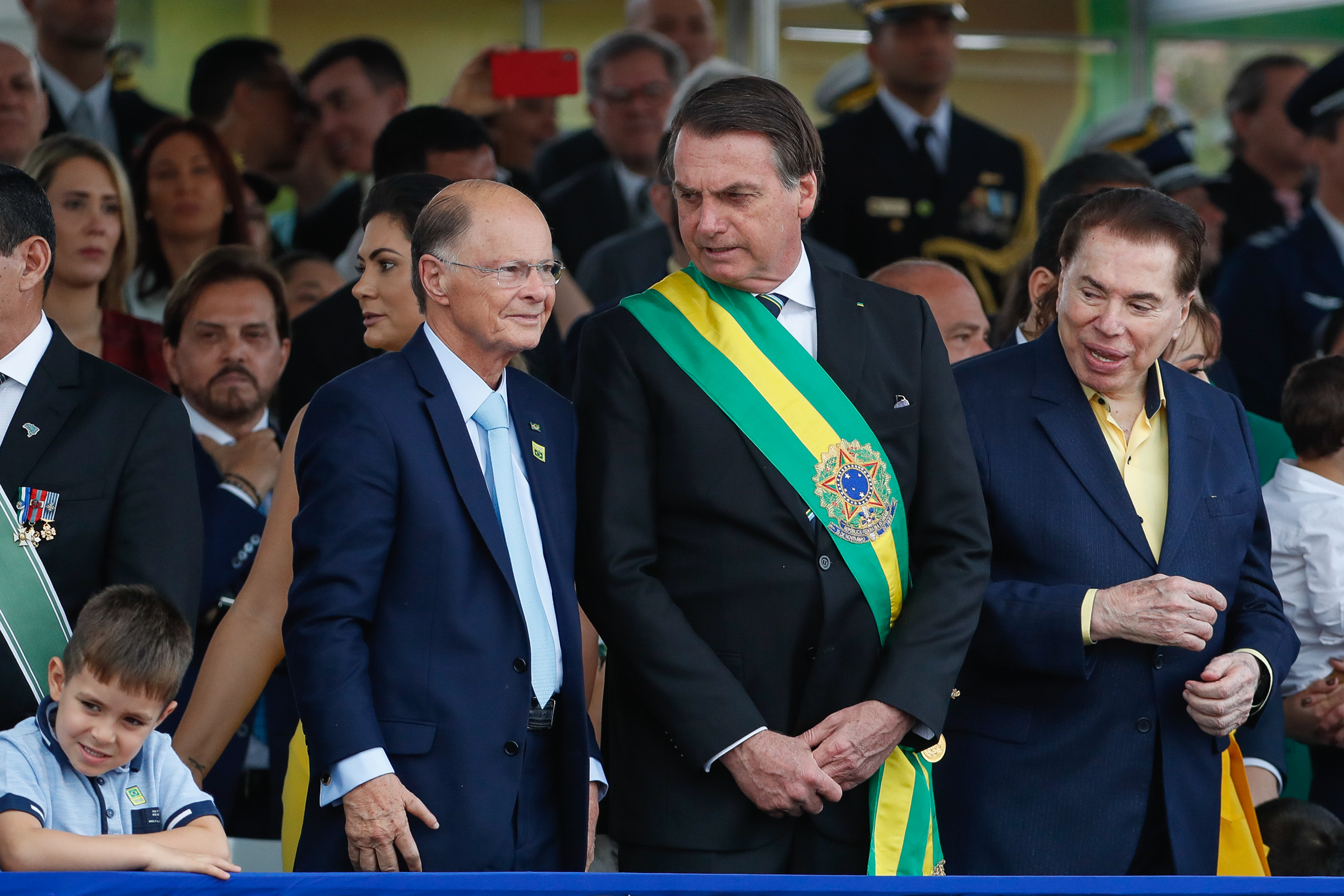
Edir Macedo alongside Jair Bolsonaro and Silvio Santos during the 2019 Homeland Day celebrations

As in previous governments, Edir Macedo positioned himself as pro-government when Bolsonaro came in first place in the polls in the 2018 elections. The Folha de S.Paulo newspaper found out, together with other journalists from RecordTV, that conflicts were occurring in its journalism editorial line to favor Bolsonaro from politically biased information. Until that moment, neither the station nor the journalism sector officially supported the politician. Due to this, that same year, the director of Jornal da Record resigned.

Writing for The Intercept Brasil, João Filho questioned the increased inflow of public money to RecordTV and other stations in which the owners appear on Bolsonaro's side. Before the current administration, more money was spent on the broadcasters from their audience, but the method was canceled without reason.

On 15 January 2020, it was revealed by Folha de S.Paulo that Fabio Wajngarten, head of the Social Communication Secretariat of the Presidency of the Republic (SECOM), received, through a company of which he is a partner, money from TV stations and advertising agencies that have contracts with Jair Bolsonaro's government. Among them are Rede Bandeirantes and RecordTV. Such fact entered the analysis of Reporters Without Borders, which analyzes Bolsonaro's attacks directed at the press.

In June 2020, a survey released by Agência Pública confirmed that RecordTV, alongside other evangelical broadcasters and pastors supporting the government, received the most advertising funds from SECOM, at a total of 30 million reais. RecordTV also received money to publicize the "Positive Agenda", an advertisement to convey a favorable image of the government to the population. Another pro-government marketing piece broadcast on the station was "Amazon Day", after the Bolsonaro government received international criticism with the burning in the Amazon.

According to a survey done by Poder360, Bolsonaro granted 102 exclusive interviews to media outlets, even though he claimed to dislike the press. Band was the most attended, followed by RecordTV, SBT and Jovem Pan.

Commenting on how the news outlets of RecordTV reported on Marcelo Crivella's arrest, Ricardo Feltrin, a columnist for UOL, pointed out that the journalism of RecordTV lacks credibility because it is linked to the UCKG.

Last year this column wrote about some of the reasons that do not allow Record's journalism to demonstrate impartiality and credibility.

The biggest one, no doubt, is the fact that the network is umbilically linked to the Universal Church of the Kingdom of God.(...) Today, December 22, the situation happened again, but in an inverse way.

While all TV stations and websites in the country were following the arrest of Marcelo Crivella, mayor of Rio de Janeiro, bishop of Universal and nephew of Edir Macedo, Record was using its journalism to "gild" the pill.

In all stations the headline was obvious and clear: "Marcelo Crivella is arrested".

On Record's Fala Brasil, however, the call to the news was:

"Mayor Marcelo Crivella is taken to Police City."

It is hard to believe in coincidence or simple editing error. This is the face of Record's journalism, this is the truth.

Record's treatment to the news had immediate repercussions in social networks and internet users.

The network was criticized for supposedly trying to "pass the rag" or distort an established fact: the arrest was treated only as "driving".

— Ricardo Feltrin

=== Subliminal political propaganda ===
In October 2020, the electoral judge Luciana Mocco Moreira Lima prohibited RecordTV from continuing to make political propaganda with the use of subliminal advertising. A subliminal advertisement for Mayor Marcelo Crivella, a candidate for reelection in the city of Rio de Janeiro and who is the nephew of the Edir Macedo, was circulated by the station and on its website. In the campaign, Record presented its new WhatsApp number, which ended with 1010, 10 being the party number of the politician. The judge recalled that a similar fact occurred in 2014, in the election for mayor of Rio de Janeiro, in which a vignette was suspended by the Electoral Justice, which advertised Psalm 22, when the number of Crivella, at the time, was also 22.

=== Spreading of misinformation ===
According to Radar To Facts, on 26 February 2021, RecordTV and other media outlets have helped drive misinformation about the COVID-19 pandemic by posting interviews with doctors on YouTube defending drugs with no proven effectiveness or with criticism of wearing masks.

== Awards ==
ExxonMobil Journalism Award

- 2005: Esso Special for Telejournalism, granted to Leandro Cipoloni, Antonio Chastinet, Steve Ribeiro, Luiz Mendes and Paulo Nicolau, for the report "Imbroglione - The Phantom Citizen".
- 2008: Esso Special of Telejournalism, awarded to André Felipe Tal, Ricardo Andreoni, Jorge Valente and Marcelo Zanini, for the report "Dossiê Roraíma: Pedofilia no Poder"
- 2020: King of Spain, awarded for the third time to the broadcaster, but this time for the report "A Besta", from Câmera Record.
