= Record São Paulo =

Record São Paulo (ZYP 302)
- São Paulo; Brazil
- Channels: Digital: 20 (UHF); Virtual: 7
- Branding: Record

Programming
- Affiliations: Record

Ownership
- Owner: Grupo Record; (Rádio e Televisão Record S.A.)
- Sister stations: Rádio Record

History
- First air date: September 27, 1953
- Former call signs: ZYB 854 (1953-2017)
- Former names: TV Record (1953-1990); TV Record São Paulo (1990-2016); RecordTV São Paulo (2016-2023)
- Former channel numbers: Analog: 7 (VHF, 1953-2017)
- Former affiliations: Emissoras Unidas/REI (1959-1989)

Technical information
- Licensing authority: ANATEL
- ERP: 15 kW
- Transmitter coordinates: 23°33′36.6″S 46°39′25.4″W

Links
- Public license information: Profile
- Website: record.r7.com

Record São Paulo (channel 7) is a Brazilian television station located in São Paulo, Brazil serving as the flagship station of the Record television network for most of the state of São Paulo, including the metropolitan region. Owned-and-operated by locally based Grupo Record, the station's studios are located at Teatro Dermeval Gonçalves with its transmitter located at Edifício Grande Avenida.

== History ==
TV Record was opened at 8:53 pm on September 27, 1953 by lawyer and businessman Paulo Machado de Carvalho, operating on VHF channel 7. Initially, covering only the capital of São Paulo, Record began its first attempt to expand nationally in 1959, when, together with the extinct TV Rio, it led the Rede das Emissoras Unidas and, later, the Rede de Emissoras Independentes. In 1975, it reached an agreement with TV Rio for the formation of the Sistema Brasileiro de Comunicação. Among the programs produced were as Buzina do Chacrinha and Essa Gente Inocente.

In 1972, businessman and presenter Silvio Santos was looking for a television concession. Seeing the opportunity to be a partner at TV Record, he became interested in buying 50% of the broadcaster's shares. However, he was still hired by Globo. Dermerval Gonçalves, businessman and close friend of Silvio, approached fellow businessman Joaquim Cintra Godinho, so that he could lend his name in the purchase of TV Record shares until Silvio ended his relationship with Globo. The deal was done, and Cintra Godinho kept this secret until the last moment. In 1976, Silvio formalized the acquisition of his share in the broadcaster after the end of his contract with Globo, leaving the other 50% of Record in the hands of Paulo Machado de Carvalho.

Since 1976, the broadcaster has been referred to as the head of Rede Record. In 1979, Record de São Paulo inaugurated its newest tower. Silvio, at the time, announced his intention to form a new TV network, together with TVS Rio de Janeiro, the Record stations in the interior of São Paulo and the independent stations in Brazil. The name Sistema Brasileiro de Televisão appeared in 1980 to refer to the network formed by TVS, Record and the 21 stations that aired Programa Silvio Santos. In 1981, Silvio got his own channel in São Paulo.

On November 9, 1989, Record was acquired for US$45 million by businessman and leader of the Universal Church of the Kingdom of God, Edir Macedo. After the purchase, the station began to structure its own national television network.

On March 3, 1995, Record purchased, from TV Jovem Pan, the facilities used as headquarters in the Barra Funda neighborhood and part of its equipment for US$30 million, thus leaving the Teatro Paulo Machado de Carvalho, in the Indianópolis neighborhood.

== Programming ==
The station clears the entire Record schedule. Aside from that, the station produces the following local programs, which are also aired on the network's national feed:

- Balanço Geral SP Manhã
- Balanço Geral SP
- Cidade Alerta
- Balanço Geral Edição de Sábado

== Technical information ==
=== Subchannels ===
Channel	Video	Aspect	Short name	Programming
7.1	1080i	16:9	Record	Main Record SP programming / Record

The station launched its digital broadcasts on December 2, 2007, the first day of digital broadcasts in Brazil.

=== Analog-to-digital conversion ===
Record São Paulo discontinued its analog signal over VHF channel 7, on March 29, 2017, complying an order by ANATEL regarding the shutdown of analog television in metropolitan São Paulo.
