= Emissoras Unidas =

Defunct Brazilian radio and television network

Rede de Emissoras Independentes
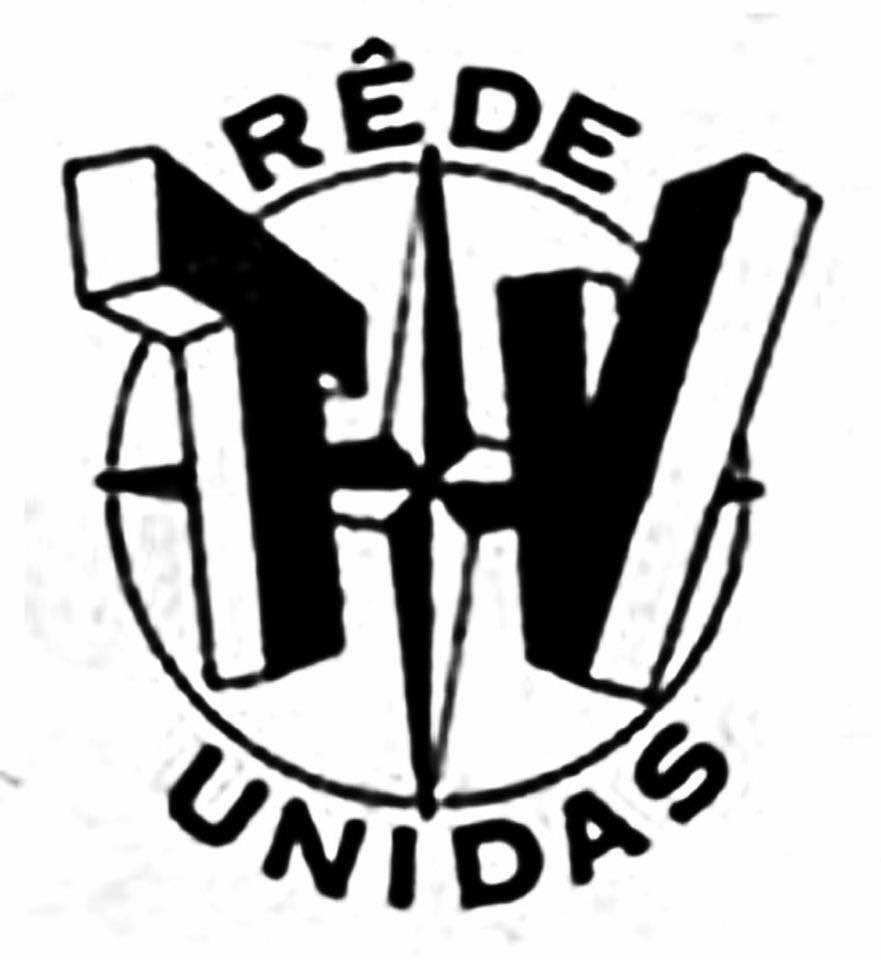
- Type: Free-to-air television network
- Country: Brazil
- First air date: 1959-1967
- TV stations: List: TV Rio; Record São Paulo TV Record; TV Belo Horizonte; TV Alvorada
- Headquarters: Rio de Janeiro, Rio de Janeiro; São Paulo, São Paulo
- Owner: Paulo Machado de Carvalho
- Dissolved: 1975
- Picture format: 480i monochrome
- Language: Portuguese

Rede de Emissoras Unidas de Rádio e Televisão (in English: Network of United Radio and Television Stations) or Emissoras Unidas (United Stations), was grouping of Brazilian radio and television stations led by Paulo Machado de Carvalho.

== History ==
=== Background ===
Its history coincides at some stages with those of TV Record and TV Rio. In 1924, a RCA inaugurated Rádio Transmissora in Rio de Janeiro, in 1928, a group of businessmen set up Rádio Record in São Paulo. In 1931, Rádio Record is sold to Paulo Machado de Carvalho, a businessman from São Paulo. In 1935, according to the policy instituted by Getúlio Vargas' Estado Novo, a Rádio Transmissora was sold to businessmen from Rio de Janeiro, changing its name to Rádio Rio.

=== Formation of Emissoras Unidas; television concessions ===
In the early 1950s, Rádio Rio obtains the license for channel 13 in Rio de Janeiro and on September 20, 1950, Rádio Record obtains the license for channel 7 in São Paulo. In 1946, Paulo Machado de Carvalho gathered the stations he was the owner of in São Paulo: Rádio Record, Rádio Excelsior, Rádio São Paulo, Rádio Panamericana, Rádio Bandeirantes and Rádio Cultura in an association he decided to call Rede de Emissoras Unidas de Rádio. In 1948, Rádio Bandeirantes is sold to Adhemar de Barros.

=== 1950s: start of television broadcasts ===
In 1952, Rádio Rio was taken by the federal government, changing its name to Rádio Mauá and given to the Ministry of Labor, which was not interested in the television license. The license for channel 13 was sold to a joint association between Paulo Machado de Carvalho and his nephew João Batista do Amaral, also known as "Pipa" Amaral.

In 1953, Rádio Excelsior was sold to Organizações Victor Costa and Paulo Machado de Carvalho inaugurates TV Record in São Paulo. With the expenses caused from the construction of TV Record, Paulo Machado de Carvalho showed lack of interest in TV Rio and sold it to his cousin "Pipa" Amaral, both however agreed that, in order to confront its main competitor, TV Tupi, both the station in Rio de Janeiro and the one in São Paulo, should associate. This association in 1957 led to the inclusion of TV Rio and TV Record in the formation of Rede de Emissoras Unidas de Televisão.

With the opening of TV Rio in 1955, Rede de Emissoras Unidas de Televisão strengthened itself, gaining a representant in Rio de Janeiro. In 1956, a fire at Rádio São Paulo shook the structure of Emissoras Unidas, however, in 1956, Paulo Machado de Carvalho and João Batista do Amaral, decided to build a "link" between Rio de Janeiro and São Paulo, similar to like-minded systems that existed in the United States, using "city-to-city" links via UHF, which at the time was the most cutting-edge long distance transmitting method. TV Rio would build the link for the first half of the route, between Rio de Janeiro and Guaratinguetá in São Paulo, and TV Record would complete the link to São Paulo.

The first live broadcast from Rio de Janeiro to São Paulo was made in August 1957, "Grande Prêmio Brasil de Turfe", live from Hipódromo da Gávea. Still in 1957, a friendly soccer match between Brazil and England, from Maracanã, in preparation for the 1958 FIFA World Cup was broadcast, as well as the inauguration of the first substations, in Santos from TV Record and in Guaratinguetá (channel 12), city close to Aparecida do Norte, from TV Rio, who aired the live mass from Basílica de Aparecida on October 12. In 1958, both TV Rio and TV Record launch a daily entertainment show, Show 713 (7 from TV Record and 13 from TV Rio), which was produced in joint association with the two stations, Mondays to Fridays, at 12pm. The program ended in 1962, when it was replaced by new variety shows from the two stations.

Other productions made good use of the live link between the two cities, such as: A Turma dos Sete (children's program produced by TV Record and aired weeknights at 7:07pm), Noites Cariocas (nightly show produced by TV Rio and aired on Fridays), Gessy às dez (interview program presented by Tonia Carrero on TV Record, Fridays at 10pm, sponsored by Gessy Lever) and many others.

By the end of the decade, new substations emerged: in Nova Friburgo RJ (channel 3), in Juiz de Fora MG (channel 5), in Campos dos Goytacazes RJ (channel 8), in Vitória ES (channel 2), in Cachoeiro de Itapemirim ES (channel 5), in Conselheiro Lafaiete MG (channel 6) and in Belo Horizonte MG (channel 12).

=== Década de 1960 ===
In April 1960, TV Rio establishes TV Alvorada in Brasília, increasing its coverage area, but, in May 1960, a massive fire destroyed TV Record's studios, causing the station to relay programs from TV Rio, until it was able to recover its structure. Beginning in 1960, with the massive implementation of television stations, Rede das Emissoras Unidas received new members: TV Gaúcha channel 12 from Porto Alegre, TV Jornal do Commercio channel 2 from Recife and TV Paranaense channel 12 from Curitiba.

==== Misunderstandings and restructuring ====
In 1967, with the misunderstanding between the two flagships of the network, TV Rio e TV Record (TV Rio acquired the rights to air TV Tupi São Paulo's telenovela O Direito de Nascer in 1964 and recused to relay some programs from São Paulo and TV Record, in retaliation, sold the airing rights of Família Trapo e "Essa Noite se Improvisa" to TV Tupi Rio de Janeiro em 1967 e 1968); the association began falling apart, and in a restructuring attempt, it changed its name to REI (Rede de Emissoras Independentes) in 1967. Still in 1967, TV Rio sold channel 12 in Belo Horizonte, channel 6 in Conselheiro Lafaiete and channel 5 in Juiz de Fora to Rede Globo, forming TV Globo Minas. But the disagreements continued, TV Rio bought the local rights to several programs from TV Bandeirantes, such as "Sítio do Pica-pau Amarelo", "Teatro Cacilda Becker" and some telenovelas such as Nunca É Tarde Demais e Era Preciso Voltar.

=== Closure ===
The problems continued until the early 1970s, when TV Alvorada and TV Rio were sold in 1972 to the Order of Friars Minor Capuchin, owner of TV Difusora of Porto Alegre. At the time, several of its stations had moved to Rede Globo, definitively ending the association between stations.

=== As integrantes hoje ===
TV Record São Paulo is currently the flagship of the Record network, controlled by Edir Macedo. It also owns the former TV Alvorada, now Record Brasília. TV Rio was sold in the 1970s to the owners of TV Difusora Porto Alegre, and with a line-up of foreign content as well as programs with less popularity, was heavily indebted and closed on April 5, 1977. Channel 13 was reactivated as a new TV Rio from June 1, 1988, having as its president pastor Nilson Fanini and politician Múcio Athayde. The station was sold to Grupo Record in 1992, becoming the current Record Rio.

The relays in Belo Horizonte, Juiz de Fora and Campos dos Goytacazes are now part of TV Globo, as well as TV Gaúcha, TV Paranaense (atual RPC Curitiba), TV Morena and TV Anhanguera. Of the affiliates, only TV Jornal and the Nova Friburgo stations (frequency currently used by SBT Interior RJ) are currently with SBT. The Cachoeiro de Itapemirim station currently houses a relay of TV Canção Nova.

From the radio stations, each station went its own way:

Rádio Bandeirantes and Rádio Panamericana ended up creating large radio networks, with Panamericana later being divided in three networks, Rede Jovem Pan, Jovem Pan News and Jovem Pan FM (respectively for local news, hard news and youth). Beside Rádio Bandeirantes in its own right, the Band FM (popular segment) and BandNews FM (FM news network) networks exist, as well as operating stations in other cities.

Rádio Record and Rádio São Paulo were sold to Edir Macedo, airing programming from the Universal Church of the Kingdom of God.

Rádio Cultura is currently a public/educational outlet, with musical programming.

Rádio Excelsior shut down on September 30, 1991, and the name Excelsior became the legal name of its successor CBN São Paulo, flagship of the CBN network.

Rádio Anhanguera AM was sold again and is now Rádio Daqui, while the FM station is the current CBN Goiânia.

Rádio Gaúcha is currently the largest radio network in southern Brazil, being owned by Grupo RBS.

== Stations ==
=== Radio ===
Station	Frequency	City, fed. unit	Current situation	Current owner
Rádio Anhanguera	AM 1230 kHz	Goiânia, GO	Rádio Daqui	Grupo Jaime Câmara
Rádio Bandeirantes	AM 840 kHz	São Paulo, SP	Rádio Bandeirantes São Paulo, owned-and-operated station of Rede Bandeirantes de Rádio	Grupo Bandeirantes de Comunicação
Rádio Excelsior	AM 780 kHz	São Paulo, SP	CBN São Paulo, owned-and-operated station of CBN; operates on FM 90,5 MHz	Sistema Globo de Rádio
Rádio Gaúcha	AM 680 kHz	Porto Alegre, RS	Head station of Rede Gaúcha SAT; operates on AM 600 kHz and FM 93,7 MHz	Grupo RBS
Rádio Jovem Pan	AM 620 kHz	São Paulo, SP	Jovem Pan News São Paulo, owned-and-operated station of Jovem Pan News	Grupo Jovem Pan
Rádio Record	AM 1000 kHz	São Paulo, SP	Independent	Grupo Record
Rádio Rio	AM 1130 kHz	Rio de Janeiro, RJ	Rádio Contemporânea; operates on AM 990 kHz	Grupo Record
Rádio Santo Amaro	AM 730 kHz	Santo Amaro, SP	Rádio Nova Morada; operates on AM 1260 kHz	Sistema de Comunicação Roberto Montoro
Rádio São Paulo	AM 920 kHz	São Paulo, SP	Operates on AM 960 kHz	Universal Church of the Kingdom of God
Rádio Sociedade Cultura	AM 1200 kHz	São Paulo, SP	Rádio Cultura Brasil	Fundação Padre Anchieta

=== Television ===
O&Os

Station	Channel	City, UF	Affiliation period	Current situation	Current owner
TV Alvorada	8	Brasília, DF	1960 – 1967	Record Brasília, Record O&O	Grupo Record
TV Belo Horizonte	12	Belo Horizonte, MG	1961 – 1967	TV Globo Minas, TV Globo O&O	Grupo Globo
TV Record	7	São Paulo, SP	1959 – 1967?	Record São Paulo, RecordTV O&O	Grupo Record
TV Rio	13	Rio de Janeiro, RJ	1959 – 1967	Defunct in 1977	—N/a

Affiliates

Station	Channel	City	Affiliation period	Current situation	Current owner
TV Gaúcha	12	Porto Alegre, RS	1962 – 1963	RBS TV Porto Alegre, TV Globo affiliate	Grupo RBS
TV Jornal do Commercio	2	Recife, PE	1960 – 1963	SBT affiliate	Sistema Jornal do Commercio de Comunicação
TV Paranaense	12 VHF	Curitiba, PR	1960 – 1965	RPC Curitiba, TV Globo affiliate	Grupo Paranaense de Comunicação
