= Rede de Emissoras Independentes =

Brazilian television network

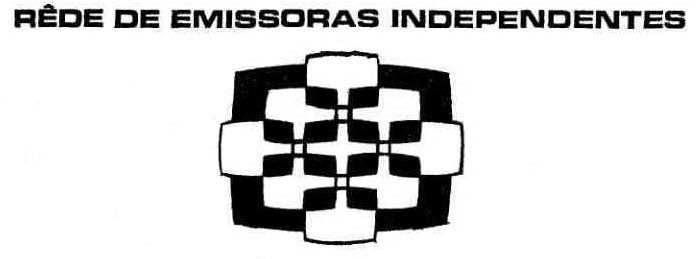
- Type: Free-to-air television network
- Country: Brazil
- First air date: 1969
- TV stations: List: TV Rio; TV Record; TVS Rio de Janeiro; TV Alvorada
- Headquarters: Rio de Janeiro, Rio de Janeiro; São Paulo, São Paulo
- Owner: João B. do Amaral, Paulo Machado de Carvalho and Silvio Santos
- Dissolved: 1975
- Picture format: 480i (PAL-M)
- Language: Portuguese

Rede de Emissoras Independentes (in English: Network of Independent Broadcasters) or REI, was a Brazilian television network founded in 1969, as successor to the "Emissoras Unidas". Inaugurated on September 14, 1969, it was a network initially led by TV Record (São Paulo), TV Rio (Rio de Janeiro) and TV Alvorada (Brasília); in 1975, the network was dissolved.

== History ==
The Rede de Emissoras Independentes (Network of Independent Broadcasters) was inaugurated around September 1969 to guarantee the transmission to ten states of the programs of TV Record in São Paulo, which at the time had inaugurated a new transmission tower with great power and reach and to compete with Rede Globo and the Rede de Emissoras Associadas for leadership in the national audience.

One of the first events broadcast by REI was the 5th Festival de Música Popular Brasileira (Brazilian Popular Music Festival), with TV Record using a signal from the EMBRATEL. In 1970 it formed the pool that broadcast the first World Cup live in Brazil. In the same year, a reader of Intervalo magazine wrote a letter to the publication complaining that TV Ajuricaba, in Manaus, one of REI's affiliated stations, only received the videotape of the Moacyr Franco Show, and even then with a two-month gap. On March 29, 1971, Jornal da REI debuted, a news program produced, in addition to the reporting teams of the affiliates, with the support of United Press International and Eurovision. In the same year, TV Record inaugurated the REI Teletheater Center, directed by Carlos Manga, for the production of telenovelas. In 1972, TV Difusora, an affiliate of REI in Porto Alegre, broadcast the Caxias do Sul Grape Festival for Brazil, the first color show on national television.

In May 1974, a new group acquired control of TV Rio, dismantling REI, at the same time as its name fell into disuse. The station even formed a new network called Sistema Brasileiro de Comunicação with the stations that were part of the old chain. It was then momentarily reassembled to show the fights of boxer Cassius Clay, whose rights belonged to TV Rio. The REI brand was used again in 1975 for the fight between Clay and Joe Frazier, according to an ad published in Manchete magazine. In 1976 it became common to use the Rede Record brand. At the time, television presenter Silvio Santos had taken a controlling stake in the São Paulo station.

== Affiliates ==
REI was led by TV Record in São Paulo, TV Rio and TV Difusora in Porto Alegre. During the period in which it was in operation, it was rebroadcast by the following stations:

- TV Paranaense (Curitiba, PR)
- TV Iguaçu (Curitiba, PR)
- TV Maringá (Maringá, PR)
- TV Vila Rica (Belo Horizonte, MG)
- TV Alvorada / TV Rio Brasília (Brasília, DF)
- TV Jornal (Recife, PE)
- TV Verdes Mares (Fortaleza, CE)
- TV Amazonas (Manaus, AM)
- TV Ajuricaba (Manaus, AM)
- TV Atalaia (Aracaju, SE)
- TV Industrial (Juiz de Fora, MG)
- TV Acre (Rio Branco, AC)
- TV Amapá (Macapá, AP)
- TV Rondônia (Porto Velho, RO)
- TV Roraima (Boa Vista, RR)

== See also ==
- SBT
- Record Rio
