= 1972 in Brazilian television =

This is a list of Brazilian television related events from 1972.

== Events ==
- February 19 – First regular color TV broadcast in Brazil, Festa da Uva in Caxias do Sul, in the state of Rio Grande do Sul, held by TV Difusora (channel 10). Brazil is the first country in Latin America to implement television.
- February 22 – TV Continental's license is considered peremptory and is taken off the air.
- March 31 – The new color transmission standard, called PAL-M, is officially adopted.
- 22 April – TV Globo in Recife is inaugurated.

== Debuts ==
- 12 October - Vila Sésamo (1972-1977, 2007–present)

== Networks and services ==
=== Launches ===
Network	Type	Launch date	Notes	Source
RPC Ponta Grossa	Terrestrial	17 April		
TV Globo Nordeste	Terrestrial	22 April		
TV Erexim	Terrestrial	30 April		
TV Baré	Terrestrial	2 June		
TV Uberaba	Terrestrial	9 June		
TV Tuiuti	Terrestrial	5 July		
TV Amazonas	Terrestrial	1 September		
TV Universitária Rio Grande do Norte	Terrestrial	2 December		
TV Clube	Terrestrial	3 December		

== See also ==
- 1972 in Brazil
