= TV Integração Juiz de Fora =

TV Integração Juiz de Fora (ZYA 724)
- Juiz de Fora, Minas Gerais; Brazil
- Channels: Digital: 30 (UHF); Virtual: 5
- Branding: TV Integração

Programming
- Affiliations: TV Globo

Ownership
- Owner: Grupo Integração; (Rádio e Televisão de Uberlândia Ltda.)

History
- First air date: July 29, 1964
- Former names: TV Industrial (1964-1980); Rede Globo Juiz de Fora (1980–1998); TV Panorama (1998–2012)
- Former channel numbers: Analog: 5 (VHF, 1964–2018)
- Former affiliations: TV Excelsior (1964-1970); REI (1969-1971)

Technical information
- Licensing authority: ANATEL
- ERP: 2 kW
- Transmitter coordinates: 21°45′50.3″S 43°21′28.7″W

Links
- Public license information: Profile
- Website: redeglobo.globo.com/mg/tvintegracao

TV Integração Juiz de Fora (channel 8) is a Brazilian television station based in Juiz de Fora, Minas Gerais serving as an affiliate of the TV Globo network. The channel serves as the flagship broadcasting property of the Rede Integração network, which has three other stations covering western Minas Gerais.

== History ==
The station signed on as TV Industrial. Owned by Sérgio Mendes and his sons Gudesteu Mendes and Geraldo Mendes, it was opened on July 29, 1964 and closed in April 1980, when it was sold to Roberto Marinho and renamed TV Globo Juiz de Fora.

The station transmitted its programming through VHF channel 10 and was the first station in South America to transmit its programming through a helical antenna and the first broadcaster in the interior of Minas Gerais to produce and broadcast programming in color. TV Industrial's claim to have been "the first television station in the interior of Brazil" was questioned years later by the population of Juiz de Fora and other cities, such as Bauru, where TV Bauru (currently TV TEM Bauru) was opened in 1959.

Based in Morro do Imperador, it produced 80% of its programming locally, with journalistic, cultural, sports, educational and auditorium programs. The rest of the schedule was filled with film screenings. It was one of the few television stations in Brazil that broadcast Pelé's thousandth goal in 1969 live. In the 1970s, Wilson Simonal, already in declining popularity, presented a live program in the station's auditorium, on Sunday afternoons.

It received awards for its programming, such as a special award granted by the government of Guanabara in 1974, for being the television station most present at the Maracanã stadium in the year, broadcasting 174 matches held in that stadium. The educational program Sistema, broadcast by the station, is credited with being the inspiration for the program Telecurso 2º Grau.

In the 1970s, TV Industrial joined the Rede de Emissoras Independentes (REI), showing programs from TV Record in São Paulo. The station also purchased and relayed programs from TV Tupi, TV Rio and TV Gazeta. In 1977, it signed a protocol of intentions to join Rede Gazeta de Televisão, which was not formed.

Despite its popularity, the station suffered on the one hand from high operating costs, low advertising revenue and successive losses, covered by Rádio Industrial's profits, and on the other hand from the difficulty of generating its own programming. With the death of Sérgio Mendes and Gudesteu Mendes and the worsening of financial difficulties, Geraldo Mendes sold the station to Roberto Marinho in April 1980, ending its operations as an independent broadcaster and becoming a regional broadcaster of Rede Globo de Televisão. His collection was discarded by a former employee at Rio Paraibuna. Channel 10, vacated, was later occupied by TV Alterosa Zona da Mata.

The new TV Globo Juiz de Fora launched on a new frequency (channel 5) on April 14, 1980. In 1998, as part of the "Regional Project of the Future", Rede Globo started to invest in the regionalization of its journalism through its affiliates spread across the country. However, five years after regionalization, in 2003, Rede Globo chose to sell its affiliates located in the interior to businesspeople or groups willing to manage them. In this way, TV Panorama then comes under the control of the businessman Omar Rezende Peres, who also wins the concession of a radio station and creates a printed newspaper in Juiz de Fora.

In 2007, Rede Integração acquired part of TV Panorama, a Globo affiliate in Juiz de Fora, expanding the company also to Zona da Mata, thus controlling 4 of the then 8 Rede Globo stations in Minas Gerais and becoming the largest communications company from the interior of Minas Gerais.

On February 8, 2012, Rede Integração, whose owner is Tubal de Siqueira e Silva, announced the purchase of the remaining 50% of TV Panorama. With this, Rede Integração became the sole owner of the broadcasting rights in Zona da Mata, Campo das Vertentes and Serra da Mantiqueira.
