= Boas Novas Amazonas =

Television station in Manaus, Brazil

Boas Novas Amazonas (ZYA 248)
- Manaus, Amazonas; Brazil
- Channels: Digital: 30 (UHF); Virtual: 8
- Branding: Boas Novas

Programming
- Affiliations: Boas Novas

Ownership
- Owner: Fundação Boas Novas

History
- Founded: December 31, 1968
- First air date: September 5, 1969
- Former names: TV Ajuricaba (1969–1986); RBN Manaus (1986–2007)
- Former channel numbers: Analog: 20 (UHF, 1968–1970) 4 (VHF, 1970–1980) 8 (VHF, 1980–2018)
- Former affiliations: REI (1969–1974); Rede Globo (1974–1986); Rede Manchete (1986–1997); CNT (1998–1999)

Technical information
- Licensing authority: ANATEL
- ERP: 1.4 kW
- Transmitter coordinates: 3°6′11.1″S 59°58′58.7″W

Links
- Public license information: Profile
- Website: boasnovas.net

Boas Novas Amazonas (channel 8) is a Brazilian television station based in Manaus, capital of the state of Amazonas carrying the Boas Novas network for the entire state. The station belongs to the Boas Novas Foundation, linked to the Evangelical Church Assembly of God in Amazonas (IEADAM). Founded in 1969, as TV Ajuricaba, it is the first and oldest television station in the state.

== History ==
=== TV Manauara ===
Efforts to establish a television station in Amazonas began in 1965, when businessmen Sadie Hauache and Khaled Hauache created TV Manauara, one of the first cable television systems in the country, using transmission cables fed by the network electricity that they transmitted to some of the approximately 2,000 citizens who had televisions in Manaus. It is known that the first experimental broadcasts were conducted as early as October 1965, with Manauara broadcasting obituary announcements. Manauara was formally founded on March 3, 1966, at 4:30pm, with the participation of journalist Epaminondas Barauna.

The innovative experience only lasted a short time due to the difficulties in maintaining the fragile network of cables, which frequently broke or were cut by kite lines. The Hauache family later applied for the concession of an open television station, creating in 1967 Sociedade Televisão Ajuricaba Ltda., which later won the bid for UHF channel 38 in Manaus, incidentally, the first in the country to be used by a television station, since existing stations until then were allocated only to channels in the VHF band (2 to 13) – TV channels in the UHF band (14 to 69) would only start to be used on a large scale in Brazil in the end of the 1980s, with an increase in concessions granted to new generators and retransmitters and the consequent lack of space in the VHF spectrum.

=== TV Ajuricaba as a UHF station ===
TV Ajuricaba went on air on an experimental basis on December 31, 1968, initially broadcasting test patterns required at the time by DENTEL for 90 days, followed by experimental programming (sourced from the main stations of São Paulo and Guanabara) until its official inauguration on September 5, 1969. Its first logo was an Indian, since the station's name was a reference to the native hero who had refused to become a slave to Portuguese colonizers. At first, its programming was all done live, and in May 1970, after the installation of its first videotape equipment, it began showing programs produced by TV Record, which at the time headed the Rede de Emissoras Independentes. From 1971 onwards, it began airing programs produced by Rede Globo, of which it became an affiliate on May 1, 1974. In 1973, it moved from UHF channel 38 to UHF channel 20, which already meant a disadvantage compared to its competitors that emerged in the early 1970s, all on VHF channels, since some televisions manufactured at that time did not have tuning for both spectrums, requiring a converter or a specific antenna.

In 1977, TV Ajuricaba expanded to the interior of Amazonas with the creation of CEGRASA, a system of retransmitters that was present in 38 municipalities in the state. As there were no satellite transmissions yet, the broadcaster received tapes with the network's programming from the south of the country in pouches, and later sent copies of the same tapes by plane or boat to other locations. The scheme was similar to what was already being done by Rede Amazônica and its branches in other states in the North, and lasted until 1979, when both began to have direct transmission to the interior using one of Intelsat's satellites, eliminating the old scheme. TV Ajuricaba, in turn, would continue to receive part of Globo's recorded programming until 1983, when the network began to have its exclusive channel via satellite.

=== TV Ajuricaba as a VHF station ===
On May 11, 1980, the station left UHF channel 20 and began operating on VHF channel 8, granted by the Federal Government in 1976. With the change, TV Ajuricaba was on an equal footing with its competitors in terms of audience, since its viewers would no longer need to tune in to a higher channel to continue watching its programming.

With the outbreak of the Diretas Já campaign between the end of 1983 and the beginning of 1984, TV Ajuricaba began to openly defend the redemocratization of the country in its programming, supporting the demonstrations taking place in Amazonas. The station's position, reinforced by the political activities of its owners (Sadie Hauache, director of TV Ajuricaba, was affiliated with the PDS, being part of the wing of the party that supported the demonstrations), ended up generating dissatisfaction among local political leaders who supported the military dictatorship. To avoid reprisals, the Hauache family was forced to sell TV Ajuricaba and Rádio Ajuricaba (currently Rádio Boas Novas, in the implementation phase) that year to new owners, momentarily leaving the media sector. The station and its counterparts were acquired by industrialist Antônio Simões, owner of Grupo Simões, whose main activity was the manufacture and distribution of beverages in the North region. Later, after the dictatorship ended, the Hauache won new concessions for a television channel and a radio station in Manaus, which became TV Manaus and Você FM, founded in 1993.

At the end of 1985, Rede Globo announced that it would not renew its affiliation contract with TV Ajuricaba, scheduled to expire in June 1986, moving its programming to TV Amazonas, which in turn would unify its transmissions with the other stations in the region. Rede Amazônica in Acre, Amapá, Rondônia and Roraima, which joined Globo in 1983. It was expected that TV Ajuricaba would then start to retransmit programming from Rede Bandeirantes, which TV Amazonas had been with since the end of the 1970s. But in May 1986, weeks before the change of affiliation, the station announced that it would become affiliated with Rede Manchete, which was expanding its signal across the country, and with the change, it would also change its name, becoming Rede Brasil Norte (RBN).

=== RBN, secular and affiliated to Manchete ===
The station's last day as a Globo affiliate was on June 30, one day after the 1986 FIFA World Cup final. As the last program, the film Amelia Earhart was shown at 11:50 pm local time, within the movie block Festival de Sucessos. TV Ajuricaba then went off the air around 2am on July 1, resuming its transmissions at 7am, with the premiere of the news program RBN Notícias – Morning Edition. The station joined Rede Manchete at 7:30 am, showing the educational program Qualificação Profissional, followed at 8 am by an extended version of Sessão Animada, both programmed locally (at the time, Manchete only started network broadcasting at 10:30 am). In the first days, the new network's programming generated complaints from viewers, who considered it unpopular in relation to Rede Bandeirantes (the latter in turn would have no signal in Manaus until the creation of TV Rio Negro in 1987), a feature that, however, It was changing until the end of the decade with the reformulations that Manchete promoted in search of greater competitiveness with other national networks.

Unlike other Manchete affiliates in time zones other than Brasília, RBN showed the network's programming on weekdays and Saturdays with a one-hour delay in prime time. Initially, this change was necessary due to the validity of the Federal Censorship, which forced the adaptation of program times to the indicative classification stipulated by the censors, regardless of the time zone (something that would be repeated years later, motivating the creation of Rede Fuso), but after censorship was abolished with the promulgation of the 1988 Constitution, changes began to take place in favor of showing its news program, Jornal da RBN, before Jornal da Manchete, at 8 pm local time (the network at the time reserved the time between 7:30 pm and 8pm for local news programs from its affiliates). Other adaptations were also made to the programming schedule to benefit local programs, delaying or advancing the times of some of the network's attractions, especially in the afternoon. During summer time, a time when the state of Amazonas was two hours shorter than Brasília time, RBN practically only showed sports broadcasts and Manchete's news coverage in real time. After the sale of the station in 1993, these changes no longer occurred.

In 1988, the Simões Group won a bid to operate channel 6 VHF in Porto Velho, Rondônia, which became RBN Porto Velho. The broadcaster was initially managed by Sistema Imagem de Comunicação, which in 1991 opened its own television channel, TV Candelária (today SIC TV), and later became controlled by the de facto owners. Although RBN had good ratings, combined with Manchete's programming, which fluctuated between 2nd and 3rd place in the national and local rankings, this was not reflected in its commercial department. Both television and Rádio Ajuricaba operated in the red, generating financial losses for Grupo Simões, which put all its media assets up for sale in mid-1991.

As potential buyers, the Ceará group J. Macêdo, a food company, and the politician and then senator Amazonino Mendes were initially considered, the latter being the closest to closing a deal. Amazonino would enter into a partnership with businessman Antônio Dias da Silva, one of the executives of Grupo Simões, and 15 other shareholders who would represent their part in the society (since by law, parliamentarians cannot own public concessions, which includes public transport vehicles and broadcasting), disbursing 20 million dollars for companies. However, due to accusations about the illicit origin of the money made by his political opponents, the deal did not go ahead, and the Simões Group continued looking for other buyers.

In January 1993, the Evangelical Church Assembly of God in Amazonas (IEADAM), led by pastor Samuel Câmara, appeared as a buyer, after the church's pastorate decided to acquire a radio station as a way of expanding its evangelization purposes to a number greater number of people. IEADAM and Grupo Simões negotiated the sale of Rádio Ajuricaba, but attracted by the opportunity to also have a television station, the pastors decided to acquire all the assets, reaching an agreement on January 7. IEADAM was supposed to pay 3.25 million dollars (the equivalent at the time of Cr$45 billion), divided into installments. On January 15, when signing the sales contract, the church made a down payment of 100,000 dollars, and must also pay another installment in the amount of 450,000 in the next 60 days to take definitive control of the vehicles – otherwise, the sale would be canceled, and all the money that had already been paid would be lost – and 24 more installments in subsequent months to complete the transaction. At the time, IEADAM's revenue was less than 300,000 dollars per month, and to complete the necessary amount, the church mobilized hundreds of faithful and members. Several of them pawned assets such as real estate, cars, jewelry and some started selling snacks and clothes on the streets of Manaus.

=== Boas Novas ===
The church managed to raise the necessary money, and on March 15, 1993, RBN came under the control of the new owners, who paid off the remainder of the purchase in March 1995. The meaning of its acronym was changed, from Rede Brasil Norte to Rede Boas Novas, basically maintaining the same visual identity as the previous administration. Behind the scenes, professionals linked to the old management were fired, with the sole exception of technicians, and were replaced by people linked to the church. The secular programming of RBN and Manchete also underwent significant changes. Times traditionally occupied by film slots such as the Cinema Nacional and Sala VIP now featured local programs aimed at the evangelical community, such as Proclamai, Alfa e Ômega and Nos Bastidores da Igreja.

The station also began to cut programs that went against the moral values of the church, the most notable example being the carnival broadcasts, which were Manchete's trademark. With the exception of 1994, where there was broadcast due to the Manaus parade and the commercial commitments that had been signed, in subsequent years all of Manchete's programming from Saturday until Carnival Tuesday (with the only exception of editions of Jornal da Manchete) was torn down and replaced by programming from RBN itself. Although the network was aware of and agreed with the changes its affiliate made to programming, the same could not be said for viewers, who constantly complained about Manchete's attractions being cut by religious programs.

RBN continued to show Manchete programming until December 31, 1997, and at the turn of 1998, it became affiliated with CNT, as was already happening with RBN Belém, which had changed its affiliation with Rede Record after its acquisition by the Assembly of God of Belém in 1995. Rede Manchete, already in clear decline that would culminate in its bankruptcy the following year, had its signal restored by a retransmitter maintained by Rede Calderaro de Comunicação on UHF channel 18.

With the wider free time that the new network offered, RBN increased the number of local programs, reaching 93 hours per week of its own productions. At that time, the station already had its programming transmitted throughout the country via satellite, through a C-band channel, known to this day as "Jesus Sat", in addition to leasing half an hour of CNT's daily programming between 5am and 6am. With the foundations formed, RBN became an independent station on September 5, 1999, becoming the generator of Rede Boas Novas, with entirely religious programming.

In 2006, RBN moved from its facilities in the Santo Antônio neighborhood, where it had been based since its foundation in 1969, to a complex attached to the Canaã Convention Center, in the Japiim neighborhood, where Faculdade Boas Novas and the temple of the Canaan Congregation of IEADAM. The station's old studios were later renovated and became a leisure space linked to a church building on the same block. In 2007, with the reformulation of the network's brand, the station was renamed Boas Novas Amazonas.
