= Nosy (album) =

Studio album by Gomo
- Released: 20 April 2009 (PT); 4 May 2009 (UK, EU)
- Recorded: 2004–2009
- Genre: Indie rock, pop, rock
- Length: 39:21
- Language: English
- Label: EMI
- Producer: Nuno Rafael; Gomo

Gomo chronology
Best of Gomo (2004)	Nosy (2009)

Singles from Nosy
- 1. "Final Stroke" Released: 26 March 2009; 2. "Still Inside Your Mind" Released: 18 January 2010; 3. "Come Say You Love Me" Released: Summer 2010

Nosy is the second studio album of the Portuguese pop rock singer Gomo. It was released in 2009 in Portugal. Final Stroke was the first rack to be released from the album. The album's songs are performed by Gomo (lead vocals), Mário Barreiros (acoustic guitar, producer, mastering, drums, bass), Pedro Oliveira, (backing vocals), Mario Santos (saxophone) and Manuel Simões (guitar).

== Production ==
Nosy was produced in a style that differed from Gomo's previous album, Best of Gomo. The aim was to make an album that sounded positive and colourful with bold vocals, varied arrangements and surprises for the listener.

Final Stroke, the first track to be released, featured Rafel Nuno on bass and guitar and Sergio Nascimento (David Fonseca and Sergio Godinho) on drums. The song is in the pop rock genre with satirical, humorous lyrics about the joys and frustrations of living in Portugal.

In the Final Stroke music video, Gomo stands in a paper factory listening to the radio when suddenly, he breaks up and starts to sing and dance with a broom. Then, a woman appears and Gomo starts to dance with her. During the chorus, Gomo runs through the factory. He is in a shopping cart with the woman in pursuit.

Still Inside Your Mind, the first track of the album, was released in June 2009. It starts with an electropop sound. In the music video Gomo is looking at the sea and starts to swim. During the chorus, he dives in and rain begins to fall. Come Say You Love Me, another of the songs on the album has a music video filmed in Sao Miguel Island, Azores.

== Release and promotion ==
On 20 April 2009, after preliminary publicity through Gomo's MySpace page on 5 April 2009 and broadcasting of the album's song, Final Stroke on the radio station, Antena 3, Nosy was released in Portugal. On 4 May 2009 the album was released in the United Kingdom and Europe. It was released in both Compact Disc and Digipack editions.

In January 2009, in an interview with IOL Música, Gomo said, "I got really touched when I saw the video that D. Etelvina (a fan) posted. When I released Best Of in 2004, our country was fighting the economic crisis, so I wrote lyrics about that situation and made songs for it relationated with crisis. D. Etelvina asked me to work on a new album, and like Portugal is in crisis again, I thought that was time for me to come back."

To promote the album, Gomo performed several concerts in Portugal. At Campo Pequeno, Lisbon, Gomo invited Katy Perry to sing Come Say You Love in duet. He also performed on television shows such as 5 pra meia-noite. On 16 June 2009 Gomo produced a concert at St. Jorge cinema and presented his album. He said, "Not only is the presentation of the new disc, like the concert will be held on the eve of my birthday. The idea is to extend a little party, to blow out the candles with the Gomo. Want to have a relaxed concert, with lots of interactivity with the public."

== Reception ==
The album received mixed reviews. It did not appear on Acharts Portugal.

Professional ratings
Review scores
Source	Rating
A Trompa	(favourable)
Antena 1	(positive)
CDGO	(favourable)
Disco Digital	(mixed)
Edusurfa	3/5 stars
Ípsilon	(favourable)
Rate Your Music	2.5/5 stars

== Track listing ==
All tracks are written by Gomo.

No.	Title	Length
1.	"Still Inside Your Mind"	4:43
2.	"Final Stroke"	3:52
3.	"Spread the Word"	3:57
4.	"Infactuation"	3:39
5.	"I Won't Go Back"	4:17
6.	"She Knows"	3:40
7.	"Out of Place"	4:15
8.	"Quest for Glory"	3:59
9.	"Come Say You Love Me"	3:39
10.	"Queen of Dolls"	3:16

(The digipack edition has a different cover.)

== Release history ==
Region	Date	Label	Format
Portugal	20 April 2009	EMI	CD, Digipack
Europe; United Kingdom	4 May 2009	EMI	CD, Digipack
