= Final Stroke =

Single by Gomo

from the album Nosy
- Released: March 26, 2010
- Recorded: 2010
- Genre: Pop, rock, indie rock
- Label: EMI
- Songwriter(s): Paulo Gouveia
- Producer(s): Nuno Rafael, Paulo Gouveia

Gomo singles chronology
| "I Wonder" (2005) | "Final Stroke" (2010) | "Still Inside Your Mind" (2010) |

Professional ratings
Review scores
| Source | Rating |
|---|---|
| Feedback | (favourable) |

"Final Stroke" is the lead single of the album Nosy by Portuguese singer Gomo, released on March 26, 2010.

== Release and reception ==
The single was released as the lead single of the album Nosy on March 26, 2010 to radio airplay. Its music video was recorded and released also in March. It was a lot of times played on Portuguese radios.

Upon its release, the song received favourable reviews from most music critics.
"Feedback" gave the album a favourable review and said: "it is something really positive on Gomo's return, he is back in the pop "Battlefileds" but also with a rock remix, sounding like U2".

== Composition ==
"Final Stroke", with the participation of Rafel Nuno on bass and guitar and also Sergio Nascimento (David Fonseca and Sérgio Godinho) on drums, was written by Gomo. It is a theme that keeps the song format now customary in Gomo, but with an aesthetic pop / rock, more muscular and organic, a little different from their previous records. However, satire and humor still very present in their lyrics, as is the case with this single where Gomo speak of their joys and frustrations in a country which never got used. "Final Stroke", is representative of energy and the type of composition that Gomo wants to convey this new album, focusing on bold vocals and arrangements varied, with the intent to surprise, constantly, the listener. A joint production with Nuno Rafael may have dictated this new way of composing, but it is guaranteed that anyone who is accustomed to the sound of Gomo, will continue to review in this new single and this aesthetic.

== Music video ==
=== Development and release ===
The music was recorded in 2009 during the month of March, while the single's release was being prepared. The shots took place in Lisbon at UZI studios and the video was produced by Vasco Viana.

=== Synopsis ===
In its music video, we can see Gomo standing in a paper factory listening to radio when suddenly we breaks up and starts to sing and dancing with a broom, then, a woman appears and he starts to dance with her. During the chorus, Gomo runs through the factory in a shopping car along the woman follows him.

== Track listing and official versions ==
- Digital download
1. "Final Stroke" - 3:52
- Video version
1. "Final Stroke" - 4:19

== Live performances ==
The song was performed during the album's promotion. During the first concert, in São Jorge, it was sung before people sung the happy birthday song, then, Paulo Gouveia invites the public to climb onto the stage in order to celebrate his birthday with his return and those who are responsible for their success. A few dozen people access to the call and that is how the celebration comes to the level expected, all dancing to Feeling alive. After the encore, there's still time for a giant birthday cake in the foyer of S. Jorge who want to celebrate with the musician. This Gomo, now returned to publishing, which promises great stuff will happen to the sound of your music. If we feel alive, even after the heat of the S. George is cool because it seems to have returned to stay.

=== Concert set list ===
1. Still Inside Your Mind
2. Spread The Word
3. Out Of Place
4. Final Stroke
5. Infactuation
6. Can't Find You
7. Feeling Alive
8. Come Say You Love Me
9. I Wonder
10. Quest For Glory
11. November 6
12. Won't Go Back

Encore

1. Final Stroke
2. Feeling Alive

== Personnel ==
- Gomo - lead vocals
- Mário Barreiros – acoustic guitar, producer, mastering, drums, bass
- Pedro Oliveira – backing vocals
- Mario Santos – saxophone
- Manuel Simões – guitar

== Release history ==
| Region | Date | Label | Format |
|---|---|---|---|
| Portugal | March 20, 2009 | EMI | CD, Digital download |
| Europe | March 26, 2009 | EMI | CD, Digital download |
