= Band Triângulo =

TV Bandeirantes Triângulo (ZYP 262)

Uberaba, Minas Gerais; Brazil
- Channels: Digital: 17 (UHF); Virtual: 7
- Branding: Band Triângulo

Programming
- Affiliations: Rede Bandeirantes

Ownership
- Owner: Grupo Bandeirantes de Comunicação; (Regional Centro Sul de Comunicações S.A.)
- Sister stations: Band FM Triângulo

History
- First air date: September 6, 1972
- Former call signs: ZYA 726 (1972-2018)
- Former names: TV Uberaba (1972-1987); TV Regional (1987-2008)
- Former channel numbers: Analog: 5 (VHF, 1972-1987); 7 (VHF, 1987-2018)
- Former affiliations: Rede Tupi (1972-1980); REI (1980-1981); SBT (1981-1984); Rede Manchete (1984-1999); TV! (1999); RedeTV! (1999-2003)

Technical information
- Licensing authority: ANATEL
- Transmitter coordinates: 19°44′53.2″S 47°55′8.4″W

Links
- Public license information: Profile
- Website: bandtv.band.uol.com.br/tv/triangulo

Band Triângulo (channel 7) is a Brazilian television station based in Uberaba, with a branch in Uberlândia, both cities in the state of Minas Gerais, carrying Band for most of the state. Owned-and-operated by Bandeirantes, the station alongside Band Minas in Belo Horizonte, covers the state in the regions of Triângulo Mineiro, Alto Paranaíba and Noroeste. The broadcaster maintains studios and transmitters located in Residencial Estados Unidos, in Uberaba, while its branch in Uberlândia is located in the Lídice neighborhood, and its transmitters in Umuarama.

== History ==
=== TV Uberaba ===
TV Uberaba, the first television station in Uberaba, was officially founded on June 9, 1972, at 9 am, through VHF channel 5. Among the local programs that the station produced at this time were Telejornal 5, whose first anchor was Constantino Calapodopulos, and Paulo Nogueira the first reporter; Roda Gigante, a children's program presented by Mário Salvador, "Tio Mário", and Show da Tarde, presented by Antônio Augusto. Other programs such as Factorama, Papo de Bola, Hora do Recreio and Santa Mass on Sundays also stand out.

The station was initially affiliated with Rede Tupi, and was also a partner with TV Itacolomi in Belo Horizonte in the production of news items and sports broadcasts. With the shutdown of Tupi in 1980, it joined TV Record in São Paulo and TVS Rio de Janeiro, as well as the Associados stations that had been saved from revocation and some remaining affiliates. Then, with the emergence of new national networks that inherited the revoked concessions, it became an affiliate of SBT in 1981, and in April 1984, it migrated to Rede Manchete. At this time, the station also began to expand its signal to the Triângulo Mineiro region as a whole, installing a repeater in the city of Uberlândia. In the same year, the station was sold to businessman and presenter Ney Martins Junqueira, and in 1985, it started operating on VHF channel 7. The station's local programs continued to be some of the most watched, with emphasis also on Câmera 2, a debate program presented by Luiz Crosara. Going far beyond a conversation between interviewer and interviewee, the program used an innovative format where even the camera operator could participate in the conversation.

=== TV Regional ===
In 2003, TV Regional left RedeTV! and becomes affiliated with Band, after the disaffiliation of TV Paranaíba in Uberlândia and its move to Rede Record. On October 1, 2008, the station was acquired by Grupo Bandeirantes de Comunicação, and underwent a total restructuring, with the renovation of its headquarters in Uberaba and the hiring of new professionals.

=== Band Triângulo ===
On January 14, 2009, the station changed its name to Band Triângulo, and launched new programming. The station also opened a branch in Uberlândia, and expanded its signal to other regions of the state, covering, in addition to the Triângulo Mineiro and Alto Parnaíba, parts of the Northwest and South and Southwest regions of Minas, covering more than 100 municipalities.

== Technical information ==
Virtual channel	Digital channel	Screen	Content
7.1	17 UHF	1080i	Band Triângulo/Band's main schedule

The station began its digital transmissions on June 5, 2010, through UHF channel 17, to Uberaba and nearby areas. An event promoted by the broadcaster to mark the beginning of broadcasts was held, with the presence of several political authorities and personalities, and led by Band Cidade presenter, Fernanda Viola.

=== Analog-to-digital conversion ===
Based on the federal decree transitioning Brazilian TV stations from analogue to digital signals, Band Triângulo, as well as the other stations in Uberaba, ceased broadcasting on channel 7 VHF on December 5, 2018, following the official ANATEL timeline.
