= Mário Wallace Simonsen =

Brazilian businessman (1909–1965)

Mário Wallace Simonsen (21 February 1909 – 24 March 1965) was a Brazilian entrepreneur and businessman.

Simonsen was born in Santos, São Paulo. The owner of a business conglomerate of over 30 companies, including Panair do Brasil, TV Excelsior, and coffee export company Comal (at a time when coffee made up two-thirds of the country's exports), Simonsen became one of the wealthiest and most influential men of Brazil. After the 1964 coup d'état, Simonsen was attacked by politicians and journalists in one of the largest defamation campaigns ever in Brazilian history, because of his support for overthrown president João Goulart. He died in exile at age 56 in Orgeval, a village near Paris. His remains are buried at the Batignolles cemetery, in the French capital.
