= Best of Gomo =

Studio album by Gomo
- Released: 11 February 2004
- Recorded: 2003
- Genre: Indie rock
- Length: 48:56
- Language: English
- Label: Universal
- Producer: Gomo; Mário Barreiros

Gomo chronology
Best of Gomo (2004)	Nosy (2009)

Singles from Best of Gomo
- 1. "Santa's Depression" Released: December 2003; 2. "Feeling Alive" Released: April 2004; 3. "It's All Worth It" Released: September 2003; 4. "I Wonder" Released: February 2004

Professional ratings
Review scores
Source	Rating
A Trompa	3.5/5 stars
Disco Digital	(very favourable)
Edusurfa	5/5 stars
Ípsilon	(very favourable)
Rascunho	favourable

Best of Gomo is the debut album by the Portuguese singer Gomo. It was released in 2004 in Portugal. The album spawned the two singles "Feeling Alive" and "I Wonder".

== Production ==
This disc, which includes the singles "Santa's depression" and "Feeling Alive" is an essential disc for all who call themselves lovers of good music. Was recorded, produced and mastered by Mário Barreiros and had different interests, especially that of Pedro Oliveira (Seventh Legion) who lent his voice after more than fifteen years without recording.

== Critical reception ==
Upon its release, the album met with favourable reviews, at Album Scores, it holds a score of 80 of 100, indicating generally favourable reviews.

== Singles ==
- "Santa's Depression"
- "Feeling Alive"
- "It's All Worth It"
- "I Wonder"

== Guest musicians ==
- Mário Barreiros - acoustic guitar track 1 - battery range 8, 9, 10, 11:12 - lower track 11
- Bruno Fiandeiro - keys range 2:05 - low band 3
- Carlos Gouveia - electric guitar a full
- Vasco Duarte - guitar track 6
- Gonçalo Catarino - low track 1, 4, 7, 8, 9 and 10
- Gonçalo Leonardo - violin and mandolin track 8
- Manuel Simoes - guitar track 8
- Pedro Oliveira - boice band 2

== Track listing ==
1. "Feeling Alive" (Gomo) - 3:52
2. "I Wonder" (Gomo) - 5:03
3. "Santa's Depression" (Gomo) - 3:47
4. "Army Slave" (Gomo) - 4:01
5. "Proud to Be Blad" (Gomo) - 3:14
6. "November 6th" (Gomo) - 4:30
7. "Can't Find You" (Gomo) - 4:09
8. "You Never Came" (Gomo) - 5:00
9. "Be Careful With The Train" (Gomo) - 4:29
10. "It's All Worth It" (Gomo) - 3:38
11. "Caught" (Gomo) - 4:20
12. "You Might Ask" (Gomo) - 4:03

== Personnel ==
- Mário Barreiros – acoustic guitar, producer, mastering, drums, bass
- Pedro Oliveira – vocals
- Mario Santos – saxophone
- Manuel Simões – guitar
