= TV Jornal Interior =

TV Jornal Interior (ZYB 308)
- Caruaru, Pernambuco; Brazil
- Channels: Digital: 35 (UHF); Virtual: 4

Programming
- Affiliations: SBT

Ownership
- Owner: Sistema Jornal do Commercio de Comunicação; (Elo Comunicação Ltda.)
- Sister stations: Radio Jornal; JC FM; TV Jornal

History
- First air date: May 1, 2004
- Former channel numbers: Analog: 4 (VHF, 2004–2018)

Technical information
- Licensing authority: ANATEL
- ERP: 2 kW
- HAAT: 112 m (367 ft)
- Transmitter coordinates: 8°17′5.2″S 35°58′36.5″W

Links
- Public license information: Profile
- Website: tvjornal.ne10.uol.com.br

TV Jornal Cruaru (channel 4) is a television station licensed to Caruaru, a city in the state of Pernambuco, Brazil and is affiliated with SBT. It is part of the Sistema Jornal do Commercio de Comunicação and is its only inland television outlet.

== History ==
TV Globo had a plan for a youth network (Young People Network) to compete with MTV Brasil, with TV Asa Branca opting for a license to operate the new station. Up until then, TV Asa Branca was the only locally-generated TV station in Caruaru (other than TV Pernambuco). The network never materialized, and the only other option was to set up a new station, becoming an SBT affiliate. TVI was created in place of the youth channel, and started broadcasting on May 1, 2004. Overall, it became the 110th affiliate of the network. Using SBT's four daily hours allocated to local programming, the station started with one-minute news updates (TVI Flash) followed by a main newscast (TVI Notícias) and the noontime TVI Meio-Dia.

In March 2006, Rede Nordeste de Comunicação (owner of TV Asa Branca) opted to sell TVI to Grupo JCPM, owner of TV Jornal, the extant SBT affiliate in Recife. Consequently, the station was renamed TV Jornal Caruaru.

On December 13, 2018, four days before analog signals were switched off in Caruaru, JCPM's new inland offices were inaugurated; in tandem, the station was renamed TV Jornal Interior, converted the operation to high definition and improved the signal of over 60 relayers.

== Digital signal ==
Virtual channel	Digital channel	Picture resolution	Content
4.1	35 UHF	1080i	TV Jornal / SBT
