= João Carlos Paes Mendonça =

Brazilian businessman

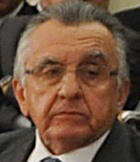
João Carlos Paes Mendonça

João Carlos Paes Mendonça (born 1938) is a Brazilian businessman. Paes Mendonça was the owner of Grupo Bompreço and is the owner of Sistema Jornal do Commercio de Comunicação, plus having control of many shopping centers in Brazil.
