= Sistema Jornal do Commercio de Comunicação =

Brazilian media conglomerate

TV e Rádio Jornal do Commercio Ltda.
- Trade name: Sistema Jornal do Commercio de Comunicação
- Formerly: Empresa Jornal do Commercio (1919-1987)
- Type: Private
- Industry: Broadcasting
- Genre: Communications
- Founded: January 1, 1919
- Founder: Francisco Pessoa de Queiroz
- Headquarters: Recife, Pernambuco, Brazil
- Area served: Pernambuco
- Subsidiaries: TV Jornal

Sistema Jornal do Commercio de Comunicação (Jornal do Commercio Communication System) is a Brazilian media conglomerate headquartered in Recife, Pernambuco.

== History ==
The conglomerate was established in 1919 with the first issue of Jornal do Commercio on April 3 that year by F. Pessoa de Queiroz. Due to its fidelity with the government, it was halted in 1930, resuming publication in 1934. The company established its news agency, Radiopress, in 1945, sending news to other newspapers in the region.

On July 4, 1948, the group made an incursion into broadcasting, with the opening of Rádio Jornal do Commercio in Recife and four further stations in the state's inland region. Using the slogan Pernambuco falando para o mundo, the station was available via shortwave in some parts of the world. Television studies were being conducted at the company in 1957, becoming a reality in June 1960, using Marconi and National equipment and sophisticated transmitting equipment, which enabled its signal to be received not only in Recife, but also in João Pessoa, Natal, Maceió and Aracaju.

In 1970, the group plunged into a financial crisis, whose effects were being felt on its three sectors (newspaper, radio, television). The recession came when the group's planned television station in Salvador did not have enough equipment and aimed at negotiating an acquisition of TV Rio in Rio de Janeiro, which did not go as planned. Moreover, the TV station's affiliation with TV Globo did not last long, as F. Pessoa de Queiroz rejected a proposal from Globo to become an affiliate, causing Globo to set up its own station instead. Director Paulo de Queirós didn't ask for loans in banks and did not believe in a solution to revert its financial downfall. In July 1974, the company had its assets pawned by the Federal Justice, causing a three-year period in which the company's administration was up to the judicial interventor. Beginning in 1979, state governor Marco Maciel started to have a more direct involvement in the company and caused further delays in payments and risk of closure.

The succession of crises that had been dragging on reached its apex in 1985, when the first strike took place, while local politicians took action to find new shareholders to sell the company. In 1987, with the company facing increasingly decaying finances, a second, larger strike took place, with the assets being occupied in February of that year by journalist and radio announcer unions. That month, Albany de Castro formalized his firing request and politicians began to find a solution to end the crisis. The solution was to sell the company to João Carlos Paes Mendonça, at the time owner of the Bompreço supermarket chain, forming Grupo JCPM. Other strategies included plans to make Jornal do Commercio more competitive against Diário de Pernambuco and changing the affiliation of TV Jornal from Rede Bandeirantes to SBT, its current network. Because of his control on Bompreço, it became one of Jornal do Commercio's frequent advertisers. The radio stations had a slower recovery process compared to the other outlets, only gaining positive finances in 1991, and becoming the leading radio station in Recife in 2008. Paes Mendonça launched JC FM in January 1989, to cater to a younger audience, a format that continued until 2004, when it signed an affiliation contract with Central Brasileira de Notícias and changed its target audience. In 2006, the group acquired TVI in Caruaru, with coverage in 130 inland municipalities, becoming TV Jornal Caruaru, later renamed TV Jornal Interior.

The company reached a landmark 100th anniversary on April 3, 2019, with the centennial of its newspaper. On December 14, 2020, the group fired 23 staff in its four core assets, in both Recife and Caruaru.

== Assets ==
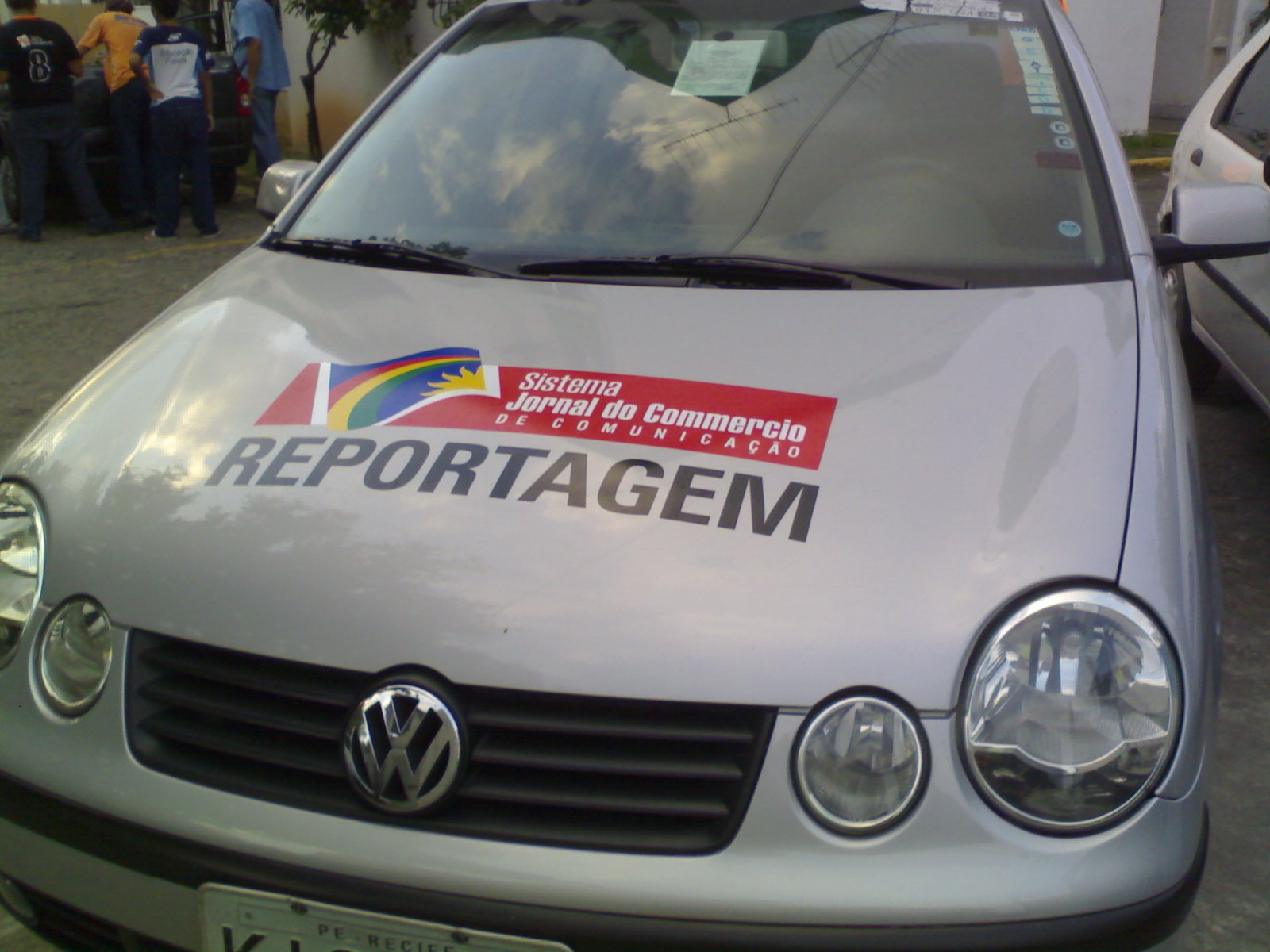
Sistema Jornal do Commercio de Comunicação reporting van in 2009

=== Internet ===
- Jornal do Commercio
- NE10

=== Radio ===
- JC FM
- Rádio Jornal
  - Rádio Jornal Caruaru
  - Rádio Jornal Garanhuns
  - Rádio Jornal Limoeiro
  - Rádio Jornal Pesqueira
  - Rádio Jornal Petrolina

=== Television ===
- TV Jornal
  - TV Jornal Interior

=== Former assets ===
- Diário da Noite
- JC News FM
- Primeira Edição
