= Record Brasília =

Record Brasília (ZYA 507)
- Brasília, Federal District; Brazil
- Channels: Digital: 23 (UHF); Virtual: 8

Programming
- Affiliations: Record

Ownership
- Owner: Grupo Record; (Rádio e Televisão Capital Ltda.)

History
- First air date: April 21, 1960
- Former names: TV Alvorada (1960-1972); TV Rio Brasília (1972-1978); TV Itamaraty (1978-1979); TV Regional (1979-1981); TV Capital (1981-1993); TV Record Brasília (1993-2007, 2010-2016); TV Record Centro-Oeste (2007-2010); RecordTV Brasília (2016-2023)
- Former channel numbers: Analog: 8 (VHF, 1960–2018)
- Former affiliations: Emissoras Unidas (1960-1967); TV Excelsior (1967-1969); REI (1969-1976); TVE Brasil (1981-1985); TV Record (1987-1988); TV Gazeta (1988-1990)

Technical information
- Licensing authority: ANATEL
- ERP: 3 kW
- Transmitter coordinates: 30°4′54″S 51°10′59.6″W

Links
- Public license information: Profile
- Website: record.r7.com/record-emissoras/centro-oeste/record-brasilia/

Record Brasília (channel 8) is a Brazilian television station based in Brasília, Federal District carrying Record for the Brazilian capital area and its surroundings. Owned-and-operated by Grupo Record, its studios are in the Record Building, located in the Southern Radio and Television Sector (SRTVS), in the South Wing of Plano Piloto, and its transmitters are in the Digital TV Tower of Brasília, in the administrative region of Lago Norte.

== History ==
=== TV Alvorada (1960-1981) ===
While Brasília was being built, the Federal Government opened bidding for three channels, one for the federal government itself: one for Diários Associados and another for Emissoras Unidas. Channel 8 VHF in the federal capital, originally called TV Alvorada, was inaugurated together with the city's other two pioneering stations, TV Nacional and TV Brasília, on April 21, 1960, at the founding of the city. The masters of ceremonies for the inauguration of TV Alvorada were Dedé Santana and Ana Rosa.

Owned by Rede das Emissoras Unidas, TV Alvorada operated precariously in an apartment on the 6th floor of Super Quadra 104, and its studios, located in one of the boxes of the Brasília TV Tower, were only ready in 1965. At the beginning of 1967, journalist Wolney Milhomem, who presented Roda Viva on TV Brasília, was hired to present the journalistic Debate em Linha Reta.

In 1967, the station began carrying TV Excelsior programming, given the brief dismantling of the network led by Pipa Amaral and Paulo Machado de Carvalho, which would resurface in 1969 as Rede de Emissoras Independentes, of which the broadcaster soon became an affiliate. In 1972, Pipa divested his media business to live outside the country, selling TV Alvorada and its sister TV Rio to the Order of Capuchin Minor Friars, controller of TV Difusora in Porto Alegre, Rio Grande do Sul.

On September 7 of the same year, TV Alvorada changed its name to TV Rio Brasília, adopting the same name as the Rio station. OFM's plans were to transform the acquired stations into a new national network, with the production center led from Porto Alegre, however, the strategy did not go ahead. On January 16, 1976, DENTEL technicians sealed the transmitters and studios of TV Rio de Brasília, after months of delayed salaries for its employees, a situation that would be repeated a year later with the Rio de Janeiro station.

In 1978, the station's assets were sold to Grupo Brasilino, which reactivated it as TV Itamaraty, and the following year, TV Regional. The new owners decided to air independent programming, focused on series, films and cartoons, but in July 1980, Grupo Brasilino went bankrupt and channel 8 went off the air again.

=== TV Capital (1981-1993) ===
After a year off the air, channel 8 was reactivated on August 26, 1981, as TV Capital, on the initiative of Rede Capital de Comunicações, by businessmen Edevaldo Alves da Silva and Arnold Fioravante. Its daily programming in the first few months went on air at 10 am, then began airing at 4:30 pm and ended at midnight. Between 1981 and 1985, the broadcaster retransmitted TVE Rio de Janeiro programs.

In 1985, the station considered broadcasting SBT programming, which had left TV Brasília, but negotiations did not progress and the channel then retransmitted Abril Vídeo programs until it went off the air in November. In 1986, it returned after years to retransmit part of TV Record's programming.

In 1988, it began rebroadcasting TV Gazeta's programming, showing attractions such as Mulheres em Parade, presented by Ione Borges and Claudete Troiano, the talk show Paulista 900, the business newscast Dinheiro Vivo with Luís Nassif and the debate program Vamos Sair da Crise with Alexandre Machado, in which TV Capital often participated. In August 1989, the broadcaster returned to showing programs produced by TV Record, such as Record em Notícias and Jornal da Record, in addition to the attractions of TV Gazeta, a situation that continued until the formation of Rede Record the following year, after the purchase by businessman and religious leader Edir Macedo.

=== As a Record O&O (since 1993) ===
In 1991, with the beginning of Rede Record's expansion, TV Capital was one of the first stations to be acquired by Grupo Record, in a transaction that also involved Rádio Capital. After the purchase, the station changed its name, becoming TV Record Brasília on March 18, 1993. In the same year, the television news program Informe Brasília debuted, which in 2003 was renamed Informe DF. In 1997, the station opened its own headquarters in the South Radio and Television Sector, leaving the obsolete facilities of the TV Tower.

On April 3, 2006, the DF Record news program debuted, adopting the new standard brand for Record's local news programs. On January 15, 2007, the local version of Balanço Geral premiered, presented by Henrique Chaves, replacing Fala Brasília. On February 18, 2008, the station was renamed TV Record Centro-Oeste. On this day, the station's new newsroom was inaugurated, from where its news programs began to be broadcast, as well as programs from the Record News news channel, such as Brasília Ao Vivo and Record News Centro-Oeste. On February 20, 2008, the news program DF no Ar debuted, initially presented by Luiz Fara Monteiro.

In August 2008, Record Centro-Oeste won the Engenho de Jornalismo award in four categories. In August 2009, Luiz Cláudio Costa, former director of TV Record RS and Correio do Povo, took over as director of Record Centro-Oeste, and Natal Furucho, former director of the station in Brasília, assumed command of Grupo Record in Rio Grande do Sul.

In February 2011, the station was renamed TV Record Brasília. On April 28, 2014, Balanço Geral Manhã debuted on the broadcaster's programming schedule, presented by Bruno José. On May 8, 2015, the local edition of Balanço Geral Manhã left the broadcaster's programming schedule to make way for the national broadcast of the program presented by Luiz Bacci. On May 11, the section "Hora da Venenosa" debuts on Balanço Geral, which shows news from the world of celebrities presented by Sabrina Albert. In October 2015, Record Brasília and the presenter of DF no Ar, Giuliano Cartaxo, were condemned for showing a report considered abusive.

As part of a reformulation of its schedule to increase its audience ratings, the channel announced on August 25, 2016, the hiring of presenter Marcão do Povo, coming from TV Goiânia to present Balanço Geral DF. Its debut took place on September 26, and Henrique Chaves, who presented Balanço Geral DF, was removed so he could take on the project of the local edition of Cidade Alerta, which debuted on October 24. With the changes, Record Brasília is able to increase its audience ratings at lunchtime, achieving leadership in the slot.

On November 24, 2016, with the reformulation of the network's brand, the station was renamed RecordTV Brasília. In December 2016, an employee from the station's operations department was fired after recording a video criticizing the channel's new microphone flag.
