= RBS TV Porto Alegre =

RBS TV Porto Alegre (ZYP 100)
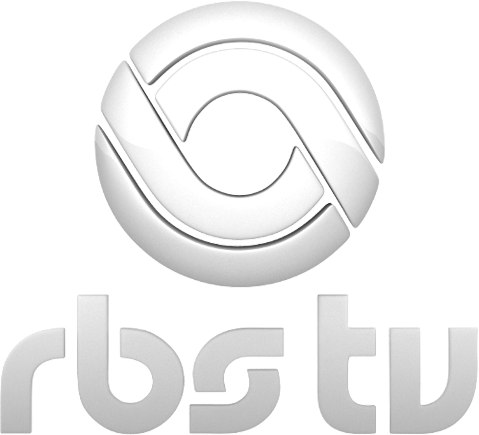
- Porto Alegre, Rio Grande do Sul; Brazil
- Channels: Digital: 34 (UHF); Virtual: 12

Programming
- Affiliations: TV Globo

Ownership
- Owner: Grupo RBS; (RBS Participações S.A.)

History
- First air date: December 29, 1962
- Former call signs: ZYB 614 (1962-2018)
- Former names: TV Gaúcha (1962-1983)
- Former channel numbers: Analog: 12 (VHF, 1962-2018)
- Former affiliations: Emissoras Unidas (1962-1963); TV Excelsior (1963-1967)

Technical information
- Licensing authority: ANATEL
- ERP: 8 kW
- Transmitter coordinates: 30°4′16.5″S 51°13′48.8″W

Links
- Public license information: Profile
- Website: redeglobo.globo.com/rs/rbstvrs

RBS TV Porto Alegre (channel 12) is a television station in Porto Alegre, Rio Grande do Sul, Brazil, affiliated with TV Globo, flagship station of RBS TV and owned by Grupo RBS. RBS TV Porto Alegre's studios and transmitter are located on Rádio e TV Gaúcha Street, in Santa Tereza district.

== History ==
=== TV Gaúcha (1962-1983) ===
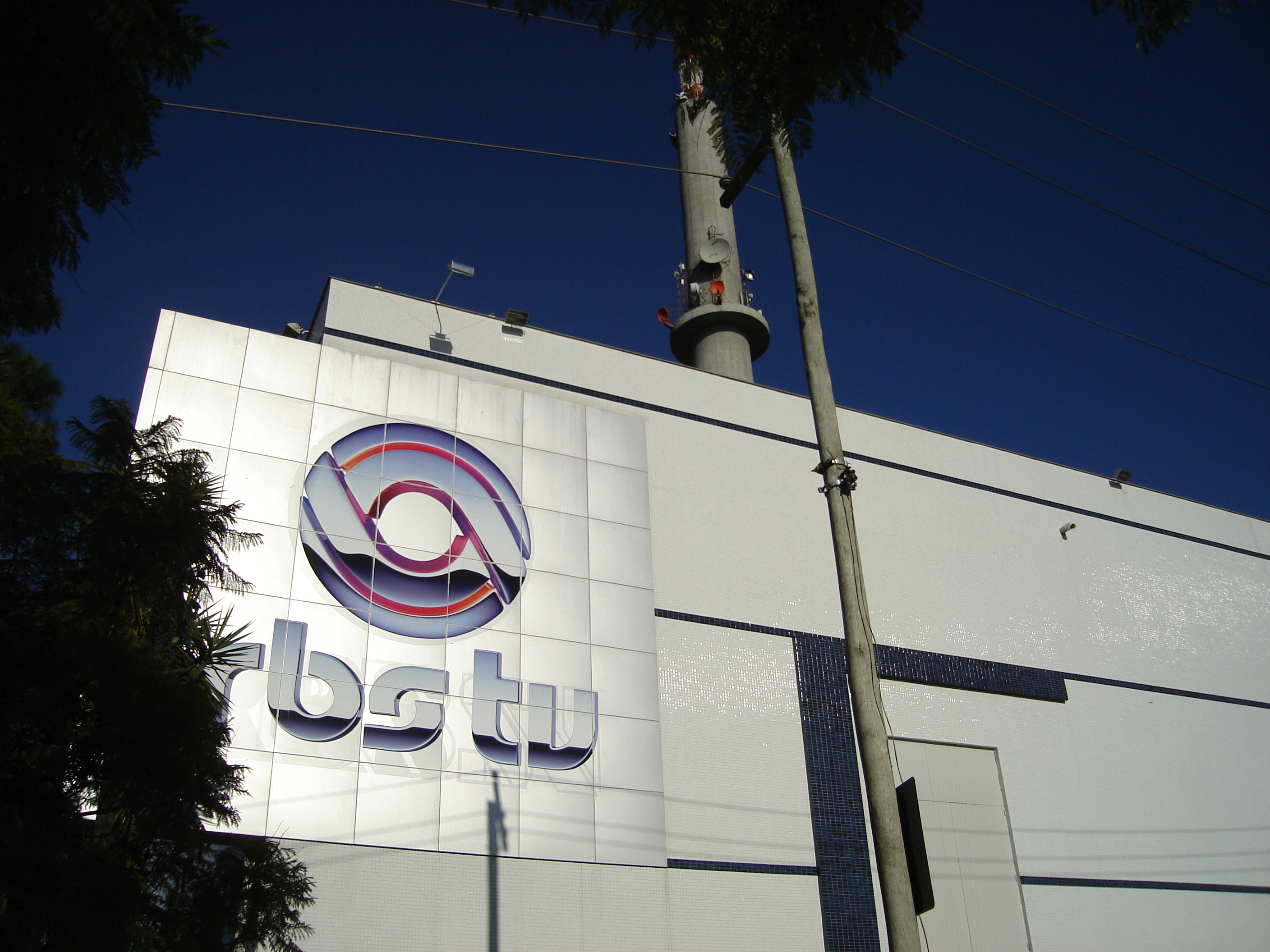
Headquarters of the TV station, in Santa Tereza district.

With the use of the Porto Alegre VHF channel 12 concession by Grupo RBS authorized by the then president of the republic, Juscelino Kubitschek, the station was inaugurated on December 29, 1962, by the communicator Maurício Sirotsky Sobrinho. Initially, under the name TV Gaúcha, it was affiliated with Rede de Emissoras Unidas, led by TV Record and TV Rio. In the following year, it became affiliated with TV Excelsior.

In 1967, with the Excelsior crisis, TV Gaúcha joined Rede Globo, founded in 1965 by journalist Roberto Marinho in Rio de Janeiro. From then on, most of its programming began to be produced by Rede Globo.

Jornal do Almoço, the station's main program, went on the air in 1972, when there was still no space in Rede Globo's national programming for local news at noon. To put the program on the air, TV Gaúcha interrupted Rede Globo's programming to show JA, which was two hours long.

On June 12, 1972, TV Gaúcha suffered a fire at its headquarters in Morro Santa Teresa, damaging many equipment and studios, a great loss for the station. Even so, Jornal do Almoço was aired the next day and reported the event.

In 1982, the Galpão Crioulo program, lasting 50 minutes, was broadcast with the aim of disseminating gaucho folklore and nativist music.

=== RBS TV Porto Alegre (since 1983) ===
In 1983, TV Gaúcha and the other stations of the group in the interior of the state of Rio Grande do Sul and also in Santa Catarina, received the nomenclature of RBS TV, in the case of TV Gaúcha, RBS TV Porto Alegre. In the same year, RBS Notícias debuted.

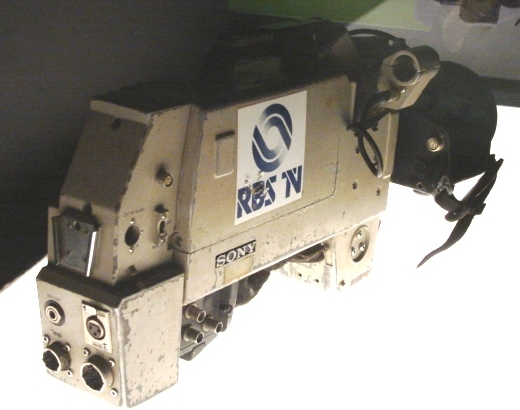
Old camera of RBS TV, in the exposition No Ar 50 Anos de Vida.

Starting in 1997, several local programs on RBS TV Porto Alegre that aired in the early 1990s were phased out due to lack of space for local programming on Rede Globo's schedule. Among the extinct programs, there are Jornal da RBS, RBS Entrevista, Comunidade, RBS Ecologia, Conesul, Teledomingo, Patrola, Anonymus Gourmet (which started to be shown by SBT RS), the Saturdays, Vida e Saúde and Mistura.

During 1999, programetes of the series Rio Grande do Sul: Um Século de História were shown, telling historical facts involving Rio Grande do Sul. December 1999.

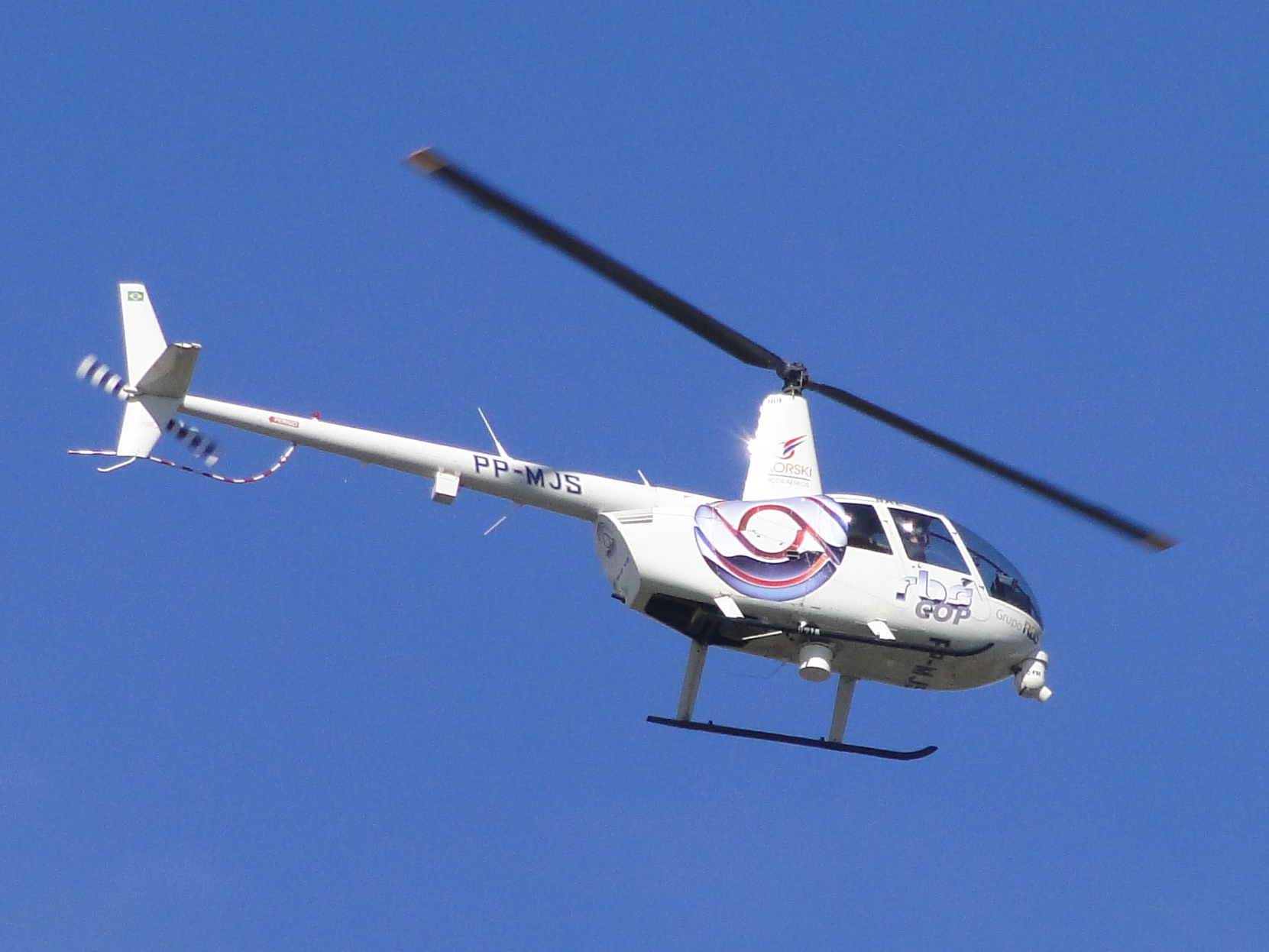
RBS Cop, helicopter of RBS TV.

In 2007, the year in which Grupo RBS completed 50 years, RBS TV Porto Alegre now has a helicopter to carry out aerial reports, the RBS Cop. In the same year, on July 2, the broadcaster inaugurated a studio in the RBS TV newsroom in Morro Santa Teresa for the presentation of the newscast RBS Notícias.

== Digital television ==
Channel	Video	Aspect	Programming
12.1	34 UHF	1080i	Main RBS TV Porto Alegre programming / TV Globo

At 7:42 pm on November 4, 2008, RBS TV Porto Alegre started its digital transmissions on channel 34 UHF. The digital signal launch ceremony was attended by the Minister of Communications Hélio Costa.

In May 2010, the station began its transmissions on channel 16 of Via Embratel, becoming the eighth station of Rede Globo to transmit on the operator.

On January 4, 2012, RBS TV Porto Alegre implemented its first network of digital relays in the regions of the north coast and Vale dos Sinos, on channels 23 (Cidreira and Santo Antônio da Patrulha), 34 (Capão da Canoa and Torres) and 35 (Osório and Novo Hamburgo). On December 2, 2013, the station's news programs began to be shown in high definition, although some sports broadcasts were already shown in this technology.

=== Transition to digital signal ===
The station turned off its analog signal, over VHF channel 12, on March 14, 2018, as part of the federally mandated transition from analog to digital television. The station's digital signal remains on its pre-transition UHF channel 34, using virtual channel 12.
