= Gomo (musician) =

- Born: Paulo José Gouveia de Figueiredo
- Origin: Caldas da Rainha, Portugal
- Genres: Pop, rock
- Occupations: Singer, actor
- Instrument: Vocals
- Years active: 2001–present
- Labels: EMI
- Website: www.gomo.sapo.pt

Gomo (born Paulo José Gouveia de Figueiredo) is an indie pop musician from Portugal. He had two hits in 2004 in Portugal with "Feeling Alive", "I Wonder" and in 2009, "Final Stroke".

== 2001–2004: Early career and "The Best Of Gomo" ==
When Portugal's radio listeners first encountered the genre-blending, Cornelius-like sounds of Gomo, they were entranced. It was 2001 and Gomo's demo was put into regular rotation, but the DJs were of no help when listeners phoned in, asking, "Where can I get this lovely and strange music?" Paulo Gouveia, the man who is Gomo, had sent the demo to radio stations with no contact information – just a note saying: "Thanks for all the inspiration. Hope you like this." The multi-instrumentalist was working on new songs and a multimedia live show while all this was going on, and he had no idea Gomo was becoming an overnight favorite. Reviews in the national press and the invitations to play most of the major summer festivals in Portugal clued him in to the phenomenon and soon he was working with Mário Barreiros, the producer who was partly responsible for Silence 4's rise to the top of Portugal's pop charts. It was an odd title for a debut but Best of Gomo was the result, and the quirky, precious, and playful album became a radio and music press favorite when it appeared in early 2004. During October of the same year Gomo won the Best New Artist award given by Portugal's SIC TV, and he was also nominated as Best Portuguese Act at the MTV Europe Music Awards 2004.

== 2005–2009: Popularity in the US and Nosy ==
The next year starts soon with the Portuguese player to move back to the US to collaborate on campaigns for Nike and iPod Nano. In the same year, is chosen to be the 'goat' in the Portuguese version of the animated film "The True Story of Little Red Riding Hood," foray into the cinema that repeats in 2008, when DreamWorks invited him to compose for the Portuguese version classic 'Kung Fu Fighting', the generic movie "Kung Fu Panda." In parallel, composed the song 'Spinning Round' for a listing on EDP's renewable energy and start preparing the second album with the help of Nuno Rafael production. "Nosy," the successor of "Best of Gomo", arrived in stores in May 2009, presented by the single 'End Stroke'. The new disc offers not only a new musical aesthetic as a graphic in an edition that the musician considers 'more mature'.

== Discography ==
- 2001: Be Careful with the Train
- 2002: O Ser Português
- 2003: Santa's Depression
- 2004: Feeling Alive
- 2004: Proud to be Bald
- 2004: Best of Gomo
- 2005: I Wonder
- 2009: Nosy
- 2020: S.O.L. (Sea of Love)
- 2022: You Will Grow
