= TV Rio =

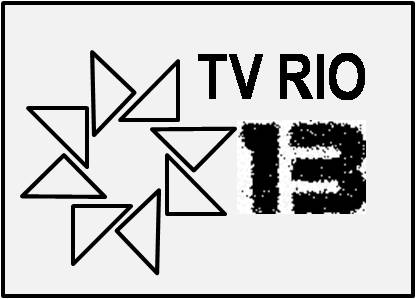
- Rio de Janeiro; Brazil
- Channels: Analog: 13 (VHF)

Programming
- Affiliations: Rede Tupi

Ownership
- Owner: Ordem dos Frades Menores (1972 to shutdown)

History
- First air date: July 17, 1955
- Last air date: April 11, 1977 (21 years, 8 months and 25 days)

Technical information
- Licensing authority: DENTEL

TV Rio was a Brazilian television station based in the city of Rio de Janeiro, capital of the state of the same name. It operated on VHF channel 13 and was founded by businessman João Batista do Amaral, its owner between 1955 and 1972. It was part of Emissoras Unidas, having led the network together with TV Record in São Paulo between 1959 and 1967, in addition to having pioneered the massive use of videotape in programming and long-distance microwave transmissions. However, with the consolidation and professionalization of its competitors, who invested in national television network projects that were left behind by TV Rio, the station began to suffer financial problems. The station went through several changes in its control, being definitively closed in 1977.

== History ==
It was on air between 1955 and 1977. It was broadcast on channel 13 VHF. In the first phase, TV Rio had its own programming, but exchanged productions with TV Record in São Paulo, owned by the Machado de Carvalho family (João Batista "Pipa" do Amaral, founder of TV Rio, was Paulo Machado de Carvalho's brother-in-law).

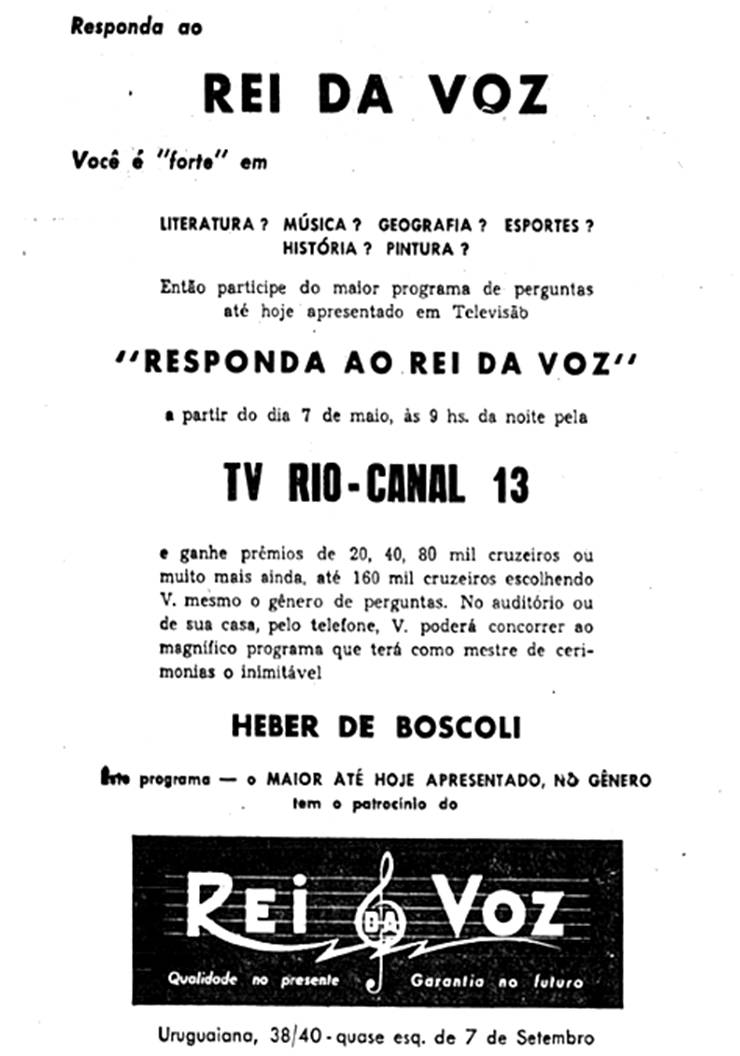
Print advertisement for TV Rio's gameshow Responda ao Rei da Voz, presented by Heber de Bôscoli

This association was called Emissoras Unidas. In 1967, it was renamed REI (Rede de Emissoras Independentes). Some time later, in 1972, TV Rio left REI and joined TV Difusora (Porto Alegre), channel 10. The partnership resulted in, at the time, the first color TV broadcast in Brazil, with coverage, in March 1972, at the Grape Festival, straight from Caxias do Sul (RS).

Today, famous names were part of the broadcaster's cast of artists, such as Chacrinha, Norma Benguell, Moacyr Franco, Dercy Gonçalves, Consuelo Leandro, Ronald Golias, Flávio Cavalcanti and Chico Anysio. TV Rio was prominent in those times with its comedy programs.

TV Rio produced programs that are still in the memory of many viewers today. In the 1950s, before the emergence of videotape technology, Família Boaventura and Histórias do Dom Gatão, series shown live, had a good impact. The programs were held in an auditorium, with the presence of an audience. In the 60s, humorous programs were successful: O Riso é o Limite, Teatro Psicodélico and Chico Anysio Show.

The Rio broadcaster also aired variety programs, such as Gala Night, Tonelux Shows, Show 713 (in association with TV Record, with the name alluding to the frequencies of the two stations), Rio, cinco pras cinco, Ask João, Show Without Limits, Rio is Pra Valer and O Domingo é Nosso. He brought famous stars from the revue theater scene, such as Carmem Verônica, Dorinha Duval and Virgínia Lane, who performed in the programs Show Praça Onze and Noites Cariocas, set to music by João Roberto Kelly.

In 1956, the year following its inauguration, TV Rio added TV Rio Ring to its programming, with boxing matches that took the broadcaster to first place in the audience on Sundays. The attraction team had journalist Luiz Mendes as narrator, Léo Batista as ring presenter and Téti Alfonso as commentator. The attraction was sponsored by Cássio Muniz stores and later by Brahma beer. The success of the program led the competing broadcaster, TV Excelsior, to launch the program "Dois no Ring", on Saturdays, with narration by Oduvaldo Cozzi, comments by Otávio Name and presentation by Manuel Espezim Bermuda Neto.

It was also the first television station in Brazil to pay special attention to news, showing successful news programs, such as Correspondente Vemag and Telejornal Pirelli, both directed by Walter Clark and presented by Léo Batista and Heron Domingues, with comments by Cláudio Melo and Souza (one of the best-known journalists in the country at the time).

TV Rio also had a quality sports team, led by Armando Nogueira.

TV Rio also showed programs aimed at young audiences, such as Hoje é Dia de Rock, Brotos no Treze and Rio Jovem Guarda, presented, among others, by Jair de Taumaturgo and Carlos Imperial. TV Rio hosted famous international singers at the time, who performed in special programs. Among them, Rita Pavone, Trini Lopez, Connie Francis, Gigliola Cinquetti, Sergio Endrigo, Brenda Lee, The Platters, Chris Montez, Tom Jones, among others.

Channel 13 also showed children's programs. Many of them became famous, such as Clube do Tio Hélio, Clube do Capitão Aventura, A Turma do Zorro, Comandante Meteoro and Programa Pullman Junior. It was also TV Rio that was responsible for the first broadcast in Brazil, in 1964, of the Japanese series National Kid, considered the biggest children's success on television in the 1960s. Other prominent series debuted on TV Rio, such as The Untouchables, Bat Masterson, The Addams Family, Sea Hunt, James West and The Outer Limits.

TV Rio also produced some telenovelas, most written by Nelson Rodrigues, who used the pseudonym Verônica Blake. The highlights were A Morta Sem Espelho, Pouco amor não é amor, Sonho de amor, Acorrentados, Comédia Carioca, A Herança do Ódio, O Porto dos Sete Destinos and O Desconhecido.

In 1963, the Grande Teatro Murray program, directed by Sérgio Britto, achieved good repercussion, where texts by renowned authors of universal literature were represented.

At the end of 1964, TV Rio bought the rights to show in Rio de Janeiro the telenovela O Direito de Nascer, produced by TV Tupi in São Paulo, which ended up being one of the biggest successes in Brazilian television audiences to date, as it reached, at the time, in the last chapter, the rate of 99.75% of televisions turned on. Due to the large audience, the broadcaster promoted the soap opera's closing party, in August 1965, at Maracanãzinho, which was broadcast directly to São Paulo. On the occasion, César de Alencar and Adalgisa Colombo performed, in addition to the participation of the soap opera's cast. This fact resulted in the dismissal of the management of TV Tupi in Rio de Janeiro, who had rejected the telenovela because they thought it would not have an audience, as it had already been presented on the radio a few years earlier.

Other TV Rio programs also achieved record audiences, such as Buzina do Chacrinha, in 1962, which reached 99.6% of connected televisions; the humorous Noites Cariocas, in 1961, which obtained 99%; the series The Untouchables and Bat Masterson, in 1962, which reached 96%; and Riso é o Limite, in 1961, which reached 98% audience. This performance made TV Rio adopt the slogan "Absolute audience leader".

TV Rio had as its mascot the "carioca rascal", a character with startled eyes and a tambourine in his hand. It was a counterpart to the mascots of competitors TV Tupi (the little Indian), TV Excelsior (two children) and, later, TV Rio would use a cat.

TV Rio was the first television station in Brazil to carry out long-distance transmissions, via UHF. In 1957, on October 12, it showed a mass directly from the Basilica of Nossa Senhora Aparecida, maintaining a sub-station in Guaratinguetá, channel 12, which retransmitted the programming directly from TV Rio. Other sub-stations were created, such as channel 12 in Belo Horizonte (TV Belo Horizonte), channel 5 in Juiz de Fora, channel 6 in Conselheiro Lafayete, channel 2 in Vitória, channel 5 in Cachoeiro de Itapemirim, channel 3 in Nova Friburgo, channel 8 in Barra Mansa, channel 8 in Brasília (TV Alvorada) and channel 8 in Campos dos Goytacazes.

In 1971, 50% of the shares were sold to Gerdau and to the owners of TV Difusora de Porto Alegre, linked to the Order of Capuchin Friars. At the time, it was part of Rede das Emissoras Independentes, having even been part of the first color broadcast in Brazil the following year.

Control of TV Rio changed again in 1974, disbanding REI. This time, João Gualberto Matos de Sá (known as Alberto Matos), acquired the shares from Paulo Machado de Carvalho, Walmor Bergesch and the friars of Porto Alegre and Sallimen Jr. From then on, TV Rio announced the creation of Sistema Brasileiro de Comunicação. At the time, the station had the rights to broadcast boxer Cassius Clay's fights, having broadcast the historic fight against George Foreman in Kinshasa, Zaire. The name REI even appeared in an advertisement for the fight between Cassius Clay and Joe Frazier in 1975.

The Sistema Brasileiro de Comunicação (SBC) brand was used throughout 1975, having an operational agreement with Record and the broadcasters that were part of REI. Among the stations were also TV Vila Rica and TV Rio Brasília. One of the main programs was Buzina do Chacrinha. TV Rio also broadcast the International Formula 1 Trophy to the SBC stations, directly from Silverstone, England, preceding the European season of the category. However, the broadcast of Formula 1 returned to Globo after the Spanish Grand Prix, which was valid for the world championship.

The station also had as shareholders Jorge Feijó and Joaquim Pires Ferreira, from the Vitória-Minas group. Still in 1975, the Brazilian government demanded that the TV Difusora group resume TV Rio. This is because all transactions involving TV Rio were carried out without any authorization from the government, which led the Broadcasting Workers Union to request action through the Ministry of Communications. Furthermore, the Vitória-Minas group ended up being revoked by the government after irregularities in its real estate businesses and savings accounts.

The group that controlled TV Difusora placed Ramon van Buggenhout as general superintendent of TV Rio, but the objective was to sell the station. However, it was a difficult task, as TV Rio's debts exceeded Cr$75 million. When an ad aired, employees and suppliers would go to the agency to link the account to pay off debts, which discouraged new advertisers. A journalist said that the real estate group Letra wanted to buy the station, which formed a line of bailiffs to collect debts — the deal ended up being undone before it started.

In order not to allow the station to close, TV Rio employees started selling spaces in the programming to those interested in making programs. Much of the programming was live, and the films that were still on the schedule were in black and white. Furthermore, RCA took the only color camera and even left the station off the air for a week due to debts.

In its last period of activity, TV Rio was off air for 45 days — the maximum it could have been off the air was 30 days, but an appeal to Dentel extended the period. To return to the air, a group of presenters and producers calling themselves the "financial committee" took money out of their own pockets to solve part of the station's problems.

On April 5, 1977, the station had its concession revoked by President Ernesto Geisel. Its last broadcast took place on April 11, 1977, going off air at 10pm during Programa Henrique Lauffer.

=== Aftermath ===
The VHF channel 13 concession was again granted in 1983 to the pastor of the First Baptist Church of Niterói, Nilson Fanini, who tried to recreate TV Rio from June 1, 1988. The new TV Rio bet in an entirely local program, with innovative productions such as the radio program developed by Walter Clark, as well as ecumenical programs aimed at the evangelical public, produced by the Ebénezer Foundation. Audience ratings did not take off, and in 1992, the station was sold to Record, becoming the current Record Rio.
