= Rádio Gaúcha =

Brazilian radio network

Rádio Gaúcha is a Brazilian radio station in Porto Alegre, capital of the state of Rio Grande do Sul. It is owned and operated by Grupo RBS, the major media company in Rio Grande do Sul and one of the most important media conglomerates in Brazil. The station broadcasts a news/talk and sports programming, as well as live sports coverage. Its broadcast in FM 93.7 MHz, with owned and operated stations in Santa Maria (FM 105.7 MHz), Caxias do Sul (FM 102.7 MHz) and Rio Grande (FM 102.1 MHz). Until 2021, Rádio Gaúcha was also broadcast in AM 600 kHz. The station's AM night signal, through propagating sky waves from the ionosphere, reached parts of Santa Catarina, Paraná, São Paulo and parts of Uruguay and Argentina. On 21 July 2021, the AM signal has been switch-off. With the change, the radio station starts to focus on the FM dial, on its O&Os and affiliated stations and on digital platforms, following the trend of discontinuation of AM radio in the Brazilian radio market.

Founded in February 1927, Rádio Gaúcha is the oldest broadcaster in Rio Grande do Sul still in operation and is considered to be the largest radio network in Brazil, with four owned and operated stations in Rio Grande do Sul and more than 140 affiliates.

== Anchors ==
- Antônio Carlos Macedo
- Daniel Scola
- Jocimar Farina
- Kelly Matos
- David Coimbra
- Filipe Gamba
- Pedro Ernesto Denardin
- Marcelo Drago
- Andressa Xavier
- Leandro Staudt
- Eduardo Gabardo
- Giane Guerra
- Luciano Potter
- Rosane de Oliveira
- Sara Bodowsky

== Sports narrators ==
- Pedro Ernesto Denardin
- Gustavo Manhago
- Marcelo de Bona

== Correspondents ==
- Débora Cademartori (Brasília)
