= TV Jornal =

TV Jornal (ZYB 338)
- Recife, Pernambuco; Brazil
- Channels: Digital: 35 (UHF); Virtual: 2

Programming
- Affiliations: SBT

Ownership
- Owner: Sistema Jornal do Commercio de Comunicação; (TV e Rádio Jornal do Commercio Ltda.)
- Sister stations: Radio Jornal; JC FM; TV Jornal Interior

History
- First air date: June 18, 1960
- Former channel numbers: Analog: 2 (VHF, 1960–2017)
- Former affiliations: Emissoras Unidas (1960-1963); TV Excelsior (1963-1969); TV Globo (1969-1972); Rede Bandeirantes (1972-1987)

Technical information
- Licensing authority: ANATEL
- ERP: 10 kW
- HAAT: 112 m (367 ft)
- Transmitter coordinates: 8°3′10.7″S 34°52′42.3″W

Links
- Public license information: Profile
- Website: tvjornal.ne10.uol.com.br

TV Jornal (channel 2) is a television station licensed to Recife, capital of the state of Pernambuco, Brazil and is affiliated with SBT. It is part of the Sistema Jornal do Commercio de Comunicação, a subsidiary of the JCPM Group, owned by businessman João Carlos Paes Mendonça. Founded on June 18, 1960, it is the oldest TV station still in operation in the Northeast Region of Brazil.

== History ==
In 1960, TV Jornal started testing on channel 2 in Recife, becoming the first station to go on air in the state. Although TV Rádio Clube opened two weeks before TV Jornal, the station had already been in testing for some time. TV Jornal became the oldest television station in Pernambuco when the Federal Government revoked TV Rádio Clube's concession in 1980, together with Rede Tupi.

TV Jornal was inaugurated on June 18 by F. Pessoa de Queiroz, then owner of Jornal do Commercio and Rádio Jornal. The station was installed in a modern building in the Santo Amaro neighborhood, where, in the 70s, the radio station also moved (which was previously located at Rua do Imperador, in the same building where the newspaper was also located). The building, which maintains its architecture unchanged to this day, was the first to be designed specifically for a television station, with three large studios, one of which is an auditorium for 250 seats, dressing rooms, a makeup room, as well as a boutique and a restaurant. TV Jornal also had its own carpentry facility, responsible for making and maintaining the sets, which were specially prepared to meet its needs. The equipment was imported from the British company Marconi, which served everything from its news operation to entertainment productions.

In 1963, the station broadcast programs from TV Excelsior and REI. Between 1960 and 1986, the station could be received in João Pessoa, in the neighboring state of Paraíba, before TV Cabo Branco went on air in the state capital, as there was a retransmitter there on channel 7, which became occupied by Cabo Branco from 1986. A curious fact is that, due to a thermal inversion effect (tropospheric propagation), the station was received in Santos, in the state of São Paulo, more than 2000 km away from Recife. The newspaper A Tribuna even published a headline that said that a resident managed to capture the station on channel 2 with inconsistent image and sound.

During the 1960s, TV Jornal produced several regional telenovelas, most notably A Moça do Sobrado Grande. It ran for nine months and was a huge success on the station, so much so that it was sold to TV Bandeirantes São Paulo, which showed it between July 24 and December 8, 1968. Despite being successful in Pernambuco, it ended up failing in São Paulo. In the mid-1970s, it applied for channel 7 in Salvador, Bahia, the frequency was eventually taken by TV Bandeirantes Bahia in 1981.

In 1979, the station joined Rede Bandeirantes, which remained until 1987. That year, the Sistema Jornal do Commercio de Comunicação began to go through a crisis that almost led TV Jornal and the group's companies to bankruptcy. TV Jornal spent 43 days with nothing but color bars on screen, without broadcasting anything from Rede Bandeirantes or any local programs. The situation remained the same, when the then businessman João Carlos Paes Mendonça, owner of the Bompreço supermarket chain (which today belongs to the Carrefour Brasil Group)) bought the communications group. From then on, TV Jornal and the other companies in the group became part of the JCPM Group. TV Jornal left Rede Bandeirantes and affiliated with SBT, a network with which it still holds an affiliation today.

== Digital signal ==
Virtual channel	Digital channel	Picture resolution	Content
2.1	35 UHF	1080i	TV Jornal / SBT programming

TV Jornal started its digital broadcasts on April 16, 2009, though they became official on May 27.
