= Record Rio =

Record Rio (ZYP 289)
Rio de Janeiro; Brazil
- Channels: Digital: 39 (UHF); Virtual: 13

Programming
- Affiliations: Record

Ownership
- Owner: Grupo Record; (Televisão Record do Rio de Janeiro Ltda.)
- Sister stations: Radio Contemporânea

History
- First air date: June 1, 1988
- Former call signs: ZYB 513 (1988-2017)
- Former names: TV Rio (1988-1994); TV Record Rio de Janeiro (1994-2016); RecordTV Rio (2016-2023)
- Former channel numbers: Analog: 13 (VHF, 1988-2017)

Technical information
- Licensing authority: ANATEL
- ERP: 8 kW
- Transmitter coordinates: 22°59′18.7″S 43°28′57.4″W

Links
- Public license information: Profile
- Website: record.r7.com/record-emissoras/sudeste/record-rio/

Logo as RecordTV Rio

Record Rio is a Brazilian television station in Rio de Janeiro. It was founded in April 1992, following the sale of TV Rio by Múcio Athayde and Nilson Fanini to Grupo Record. After the sale, Edir Macedo renamed the station "TV Record Rio de Janeiro." In addition to retransmitting RecordTV's national programming, the station also produces some of Record's programming.

== History ==
=== First TV Rio ===
The first TV Rio was on the air from 1955 to 1977, broadcasting on channel 13 VHF. Initially, TV Rio had its own schedule but exchanged productions with São Paulo's TV Record, owned by the Machado de Carvalho family (João Batista "Pipa" do Amaral, founder of TV Rio, was the brother-in-law of Paulo Machado de Carvalho). This association was known as Emissoras Unidas. In 1967, it was renamed REI (Rede de Emissoras Independentes). Later, in 1972, TV Rio left REI and joined TV Difusora (Porto Alegre), channel 10. This partnership led to the first color TV broadcast in Brazil, with coverage of the Festa da Uva in Caxias do Sul (RS) in March 1972.

The artists who played significant roles at the first TV Rio included well-known names such as Chacrinha, Norma Benguell, Moacyr Franco, Dercy Gonçalves, Consuelo Leandro, Ronald Golias, Flávio Cavalcanti, and Chico Anysio. TV Rio was notable for its comedy programs during that era.

TV Rio produced programs that are still remembered by many viewers today. In the 1950s, before the advent of videotape technology, live series such as Família Boaventura and Histórias do Dom Gatão received widespread acclaim. These programs were filmed in an auditorium with a live studio audience. In the 1960s, the station enjoyed success with several comedy series, including O Riso é o Limite, Teatro Psicodélico, and Chico Anysio Show.

The station also aired a number of variety shows, including Noite de Gala, Espetáculos Tonelux, Show 713 (a collaboration with TV Record São Paulo, named for the frequencies of both stations), Rio, Cinco Pra Cinco, Ask João, Show Sem Limites, Rio é Pra Valer, and O Domingo é Nosso. It featured famous stars from the magazine theater, such as Carmem Verônica, Dorinha Duval, and Virgínia Lane, who appeared in programs like Show Praça Onze and Noites Cariocas, with music by João Roberto Kelly.

In 1956, TV Rio added TV Rio Ring to its schedule, featuring boxing matches that made the station the top choice for audiences on Sundays. The show's team included journalist Luiz Mendes, ring presenter Léo Batista, and commentator Téti Alfonso. The program's success prompted the competing broadcaster, TV Excelsior, to launch Dois no Ring on Saturdays, with narration by Oduvaldo Cozzi, commentary by Otávio Name, and presentation by Manuel Espezim Bermuda Neto.

It was also the first television station in Brazil to focus on news, airing successful programs such as Correspondente Vemag and Telejornal Pirelli. Both programs were directed by Walter Clark and presented by Léo Batista and Heron Domingues, with commentary from Cláudio Melo and Souza, one of the most well-known journalists in the country at the time.

The station featured youth shows such as Hoje é Dia de Rock, Brotos no Treze, and Rio Jovem Guarda, presented by figures like Jair de Taumaturgo and Carlos Imperial. TV Rio also hosted renowned international singers of the time, who performed on special programs. Among them were Rita Pavone, Trini Lopez, Connie Francis, Gigliola Cinquetti, Sergio Endrigo, Brenda Lee, The Platters, Chris Montez, and Tom Jones, among others.

Channel 13 also aired children's programs, many of which became famous, such as Clube do Tio Hélio, Clube do Capitão Aventura, A Turma do Zorro, Commander Meteoro, and the Pullman Junior Program. The station was the first in Brazil to broadcast the Japanese series National Kid in 1964. Other notable series that premiered on TV Rio included The Untouchables, Bat Masterson, The Addams Family, Sea Hunt, James West and The Outer Limits.

At the end of 1964, TV Rio acquired the broadcast rights to air the telenovela O Direito de Nascer, produced by TV Tupi in São Paulo. The telenovela became one of the biggest hits in Brazilian television history, achieving a viewership rate of 99.75% during its final episode. Due to its immense popularity, the station hosted the soap opera's closing party at Maracanãzinho in August 1965, with a live broadcast to São Paulo. The event featured performances by César de Alencar and Adalgisa Colombo, as well as appearances by the telenovela's cast. This success led to the dismissal of the TV Tupi management in Rio de Janeiro, which had initially rejected the telenovela, believing it would not attract an audience because it had previously been broadcast on radio.

TV Rio was the first television broadcaster in Brazil to conduct long-distance broadcasts via UHF. On October 12, 1957, it broadcast a mass directly from the Basilica of Our Lady of Aparecida and maintained a sub-station in Guaratinguetá on channel 12, which retransmitted TV Rio's live programming. Other sub-stations were established, including channel 12 in Belo Horizonte (TV Belo Horizonte), channel 5 in Juiz de Fora, channel 8 in Conselheiro Lafayete, channel 2 in Vitória, channel 3 in Nova Friburgo, channel 8 in Barra Mansa, channel 8 in Brasília (TV Alvorada), and channel 8 in Campos dos Goytacazes.

In 1972, the station left Rede de Emissoras Independentes (REI) after being sold to a group associated with the Order of Capuchins of the Catholic Church, which also owned TV Difusora (channel 10) in Porto Alegre. The new owners attempted to implement a lineup based on films, series, and cartoons, but the effort failed because many of these programs had already been aired by other broadcasters in Rio de Janeiro.

On April 5, 1977, the station, already in debt, went off the air after its transmitters were sealed due to failure to pay the crystal rent to RCA Eletrônica. In 1980, the sister station in Porto Alegre was sold to Rede Bandeirantes.

=== Second TV Rio ===
On November 29, 1983, the license for channel 13 was granted to Radiodifusão Ebenézer Ltda., controlled by Pastor Nilson Fanini, leader of the First Baptist Church of Niterói, with Cláudio Macário as a partner. The bid included competitors such as Editora Abril, Rádio Metropolitana, Rádio Capital, the Government of the State of Rio de Janeiro, and fourteen other companies. Pastor Fanini allegedly secured the concession with the support of federal deputy Arolde de Oliveira, a former regional director of the National Telecommunications Department (DENTEL) and a political ally of President João Figueiredo, who had participated in the celebrations of the seventh anniversary of Fanini's television program Reunião (which aired on TVE Rio de Janeiro) that year.

With plans to revive TV Rio, Fanini purchased and patented the idle name, investing US$6 million (equivalent to 180 million cruzados) in importing equipment from Japan and renovating a historic three-story building at Rua Miguel de Frias, 57, in the Cidade Nova neighborhood. The building had previously housed the children's wing of the Santa Casa da Misericórdia in Rio de Janeiro, which had been deactivated since 1975.

== Record Rio programs ==
- RJ no Ar (morning news)
- Balanço Geral RJ (afternoon news)
- Cidade Alerta Rio (afternoon news)
- Rio Bom Demais (Saturday)
- Domingo de Prêmios (Sunday)

== Record shows produced and shot by Record Rio ==
- Dancing Brasil
- Apocalipse
- Belaventura
- Ribeirão do Tempo
- Os Dez Mandamentos
