= Léo Batista =

Brazilian journalist and television presenter (1932–2025)

- João Baptista Bellinaso Neto
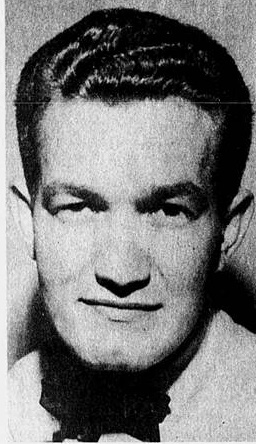
- Léo Batista in 1961
- Born: July 22, 1932; Cordeirópolis, São Paulo, Brazil
- Died: January 19, 2025 (aged 92); Rio de Janeiro, Brazil
- Occupations: Television presenter Voice actor Announcer
- Employer: TV Globo

João Baptista Bellinaso Neto, better known as Léo Batista (July 22, 1932 – January 19, 2025), was a Brazilian presenter, voice actor and announcer.

In 1970, he joined TV Globo, the country's leading TV station, where he stayed for more than 50 years. With the death of Cid Moreira, he became the broadcaster's longest-serving employee, aged 92 until his death. He was in charge of sports programs, as well as presenting some editions of the Globo Esporte program.

Léo was one of the journalists who broadcast Garrincha's first official soccer match. He was a Botafogo fan.

== Biography ==
=== Early years ===
Son of Italian immigrants Antonio Bellinaso and Maria Rivaben, João Baptista was born in the interior of São Paulo in the then district of Cordeiro, in the municipality of Limeira. The pseudonym "Léo" came from his sister's name, Leonilda – "she hates her name, Leonilda, and we only call her Nilda. I took her 'Léo', left João Bellinaso Neto aside, and became Léo Batista" – said Léo. He moved to Campinas to study. During this time he worked as a waiter and "handyman" in a boarding house that belonged to his father.

In 1947, he made his debut on the microphone at the invitation of a cousin, Antonio Beraldo, known as Toninho, who opened a loudspeaker service in Cordeirópolis, something very common in small towns. The studio was in a square near his father's boarding house. Léo was the last to take the test. He read an ad, performed a song, and got the opportunity to broadcast news. His cousin liked it and said that he would be the announcer. Léo said he thought he was crazy just to think of presenting this idea to his father, Antonio Francesco Belinaso, who was already upset that he had left school to become a waiter.

His father's reaction was to be expected. Especially since, at that time, broadcasters, actors, and musicians were all frowned upon because of the common belief that they led bohemian. However, Beraldo said the magic words to his uncle: "Mr. Antônio, he's going to work, but not for free. I'll give him 200,000 réis just to get started. And if he gets any ads, he'll get a commission." With no money, the father immediately changed his tone: "Oh, he's going to earn a little money? That's fine, but it has to be after working hours at the boarding house".

== Professional career ==
=== Radio ===
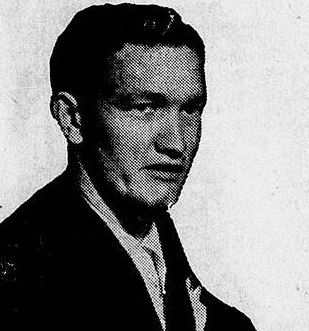
Leo Batista in 1954.

Approximately six months after his experience with his cousin Beraldo, Léo received an invitation from Domingos Lote Neto. He liked his voice and insisted on taking him for a test at the newly opened Rádio Clube de Birigui, which he did. Léo was hired. There, he broadcast soccer matches, the Independence parade, and auditorium programs such as "Clube da Alegria", in which he had the privilege of introducing Hebe Camargo at the station's first-anniversary party.

In Piracicaba, he worked for Difusora Radio. At the time, the local team, XV de Novembro, had climbed to the first division of Paulistão and was looking for a sports announcer. Léo began to follow and narrate the games from the old pitch on Regente Street (the Barão da Serra Negra stadium didn't exist yet). After gaining experience in sports coverage in larger stadiums, he started broadcasting matches in stadiums such as Pacaembu in São Paulo and Vila Belmiro in the city of Santos. Léo himself reveals in his interviews: "I was daring. I even came to Rio to broadcast the 1950 FIFA World Cup."

In 1952, Léo went to Rio de Janeiro to apply for a job at Clube do Brasil Radio, but instead was hired by Rádio Globo to work as an announcer and news editor on the program "O Globo no Ar", hosted by Raul Brunini.

His debut as a sports announcer came in a match between São Cristóvão and Bonsucesso at the Maracanã. From the 1950 edition onwards, Léo took part in all the FIFA World Cups, totaling 13 editions of the competition. 13 was also the number of Olympic Games in which he worked for the broadcaster. He also performed at the Pan American Games and Formula One races. "I haven't missed anything else," says Léo an interview with Observatório da Imprensa.

He was one of those who broadcast Mané Garrincha's first career match in 1953. On Rádio Globo, Léo Batista made history in 1954, as the first broadcaster to report on Getúlio Vargas' suicide.

=== TV ===
Léo always liked the medium. In 1955, he changed jobs and moved to the now-defunct TV Rio, where for 13 years he commanded Telejornal Pirelli, one of the most successful newscasts on television. He was also an announcer for the animation The Marvel Super Heroes.

He arrived at TV Globo in 1970 and soon stood out due to his relaxed style. In 1970, as a freelancer, he was asked to join TV Globo's sports team, which had sent its top names to Mexico to cover the World Cup. He was also invited to join the team.

Shortly after the World Cup, he had to replace presenter Cid Moreira on an edition of Jornal Nacional. He responded well and was hired permanently, even presenting the Saturday editions of JN.

Léo Batista was Globo's longest-serving presenter and was one of the creators of the Globo Esporte – the broadcaster's sports program in 1978. At the broadcaster, Léo inaugurated Jornal Hoje in 1971, alongside Luís Jatobá and Márcia Mendes, took part in Globo Rural, narrated the goals of the day on Fantástico, and has a captive microphone on Globo Esporte and Esporte Espetacular.

In the 1980s and 1990s, he even presented a sports block on Jornal Nacional on Saturdays. His face could be seen on the Saturday editions of Globo Esporte and his voice on Wednesdays during breaks in the Brazilian national team matches.

In 1994, he was the first to announce the death of Brazilian Formula One driver Ayrton Senna. He was on Fantástico from 1973 until 2007.

=== Retirement ===
In 2007, in an interview with the Brazilian Press Association (ABI), Léo always commented: "If they find a machine gun, with a real bullet, that doesn't miss, to shoot me, I'll suddenly stop working. But if not, I won't stop. I'm 75 years old, I've completed 60 years in the profession – and I can't even find the right word to describe how I feel about it." He continues: "The other day I was imagining the time when I can no longer go into the station and talk to my friends. I avoid thinking about that. I want to carry on doing my job. Unless they think I've gotten too old, that I'm already an old man. (laughs) As long as God gives me a voice and my health and TV Globo wants me to, I'll carry on."

== Personal life ==
He was married to Leyla Chavantes Belinaso, who drowned in the swimming pool of the couple's home in the Jacarepaguá neighborhood in Rio, who died at the age of 84 on January 29, 2022. The couple had two daughters.

=== Death ===
He died at the age of 92, on January 19, 2025, after spending thirteen days in the Rio D'Or Hospital. The announcer had been diagnosed with pancreatic cancer after complaining of abdominal pain and dehydration. His body was laid to rest at the headquarters of Botafogo, his favorite team. He was buried with his parents in his hometown of Cordeirópolis, in the interior of São Paulo.

His death was mourned by the president of Brazil, Luiz Inácio Lula da Silva, who wrote "Brazil will miss his talent". Cristina Saad (UNIÃO), mayor of Batista's hometown, Cordeirópolis, decreed three days of mourning in the municipality. State soccer championship matches held a minute's silence in honor of Batista. The mayor of Rio de Janeiro, Eduardo Paes (PSD), the city where Batista lived for more than 60 years, sent a wreath of flowers to the funeral. The Brazilian Football Confederation (CBF) and Rio de Janeiro Senator and former soccer player Romário (PL) also sent flowers.

== Honors and recognition ==
To commemorate his 76 years in sports journalism, Léo Batista had his story described in a four-part series called "Léo Batista - A Voz Marcante". It was shown in June 2024 on the SporTV channel. The documentary was directed by Kizzy Magalhães and featured several testimonials, such as Pedro Bial, Galvão Bueno, and Luís Roberto.
