= SIC TV =

SIC TV (ZYB 597)
Porto Velho, Rondônia; Brazil
- Channels: Digital: 40 (UHF); Virtual: 11

Programming
- Affiliations: Record

Ownership
- Owner: Sistema Imagem de Comunicação; (Sistema Imagem de Comunicação TV Candelária Ltda.)
- Sister stations: Record News Rondônia; Parecis FM; Vitória Régia FM

History
- First air date: April 15, 1991
- Former names: TV Candelária (1991-2015)
- Former channel numbers: Analog: 10 (VHF, 1991-2018)

Technical information
- Licensing authority: ANATEL
- ERP: 1.5 kW
- Transmitter coordinates: 8°45′1.9″S 63°52′34.6″W

Links
- Public license information: Profile
- Website: sictv.com.br

SIC TV (channel 11) is a Brazilian television station licensed to Pimenta Bueno, based in Porto Velho, capital of the state of Rondônia, serving as an affiliate of Record. The station is owned by Sistema Imagem de Comunicação, largest communications group in the state.

== History ==
The station started broadcasting on April 15, 1991, as TV Candelária. The station has been an affiliate of the Record network since its inception. It caused a change in the strategy of Sistema Imagem's core business, which started as an advertising agency in 1983.

The group started inland relay stations beginning in 1995, with a station in Ji-Paraná on channel 4, Cacoal in 1998, Jarú in 2002, Pimenta Bueno, Espigão do Oeste, Nova Brasilândia and Alvorada do Oeste in 2008, and later, Ariquemes and Vilhena. On March 28, 2008, its sister station, Record News Rondônia, started broadcasting on channel 58 in Porto Velho.

In November 2014, one of its local programs, Tempo Real, started having a weekly segment in collaboration with AMDEPRO, Minuto do Defensor, aimed at answering questions from viewers on public safety topics.

On May 29, 2015, it was renamed SIC TV.

In 2022, SIC TV moved to Star One D2. In July that year, the station rose to second place among the stations available in Porto Velho, a 11.5% increase related to 2021, placing it behind TV Allamanda and leading station Rede Amazônica Porto Velho.

== Technical information ==
Virtual channel	Digital channel	Aspect ratio	Content
10.1	40 UHF	1080i	SIC TV/Record's main programming
