= TV Excelsior =

Defunct Brazilian television network

- Type: Free-to-air television network
- Country: Brazil
- Stations: TV Excelsior São Paulo; TV Excelsior Rio de Janeiro
- Headquarters: São Paulo, Brazil

Programming
- Language: Portuguese
- Picture format: 480i SDTV

Ownership
- Owner: Televisão Excelsior S.A. (Organizações Victor Costa)
- Key people: Mário Wallace Simonsen

History
- Launched: July 9, 1960; 66 years ago
- Founder: Mário Wallace Simonsen
- Closed: October 1, 1970; 56 years ago

TV Excelsior was a Brazilian television network founded by Mário Wallace Simonsen on July 9, 1960, in São Paulo, São Paulo. Its last broadcast happened on September 30, 1970, when the Brazilian military dictatorship put an abrupt end to it.

== History ==
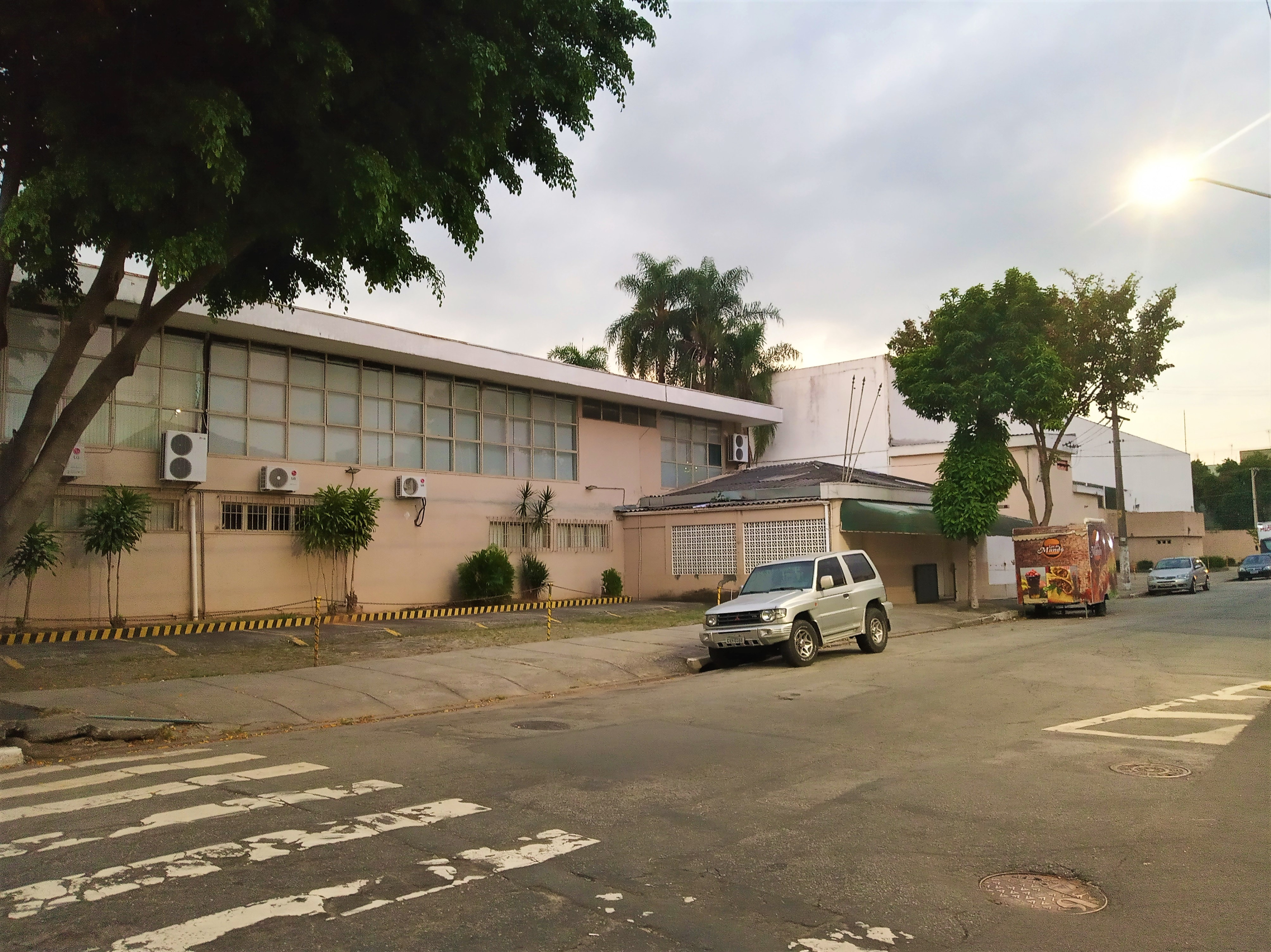
Former television studios of TV Excelsior in Vila Guilherme district, São Paulo

In 1959, Organizações Victor Costa, owner of TV Paulista, channel 5 of São Paulo (later acquired by TV Globo), was awarded by the federal government with a second television channel in the city, on VHF channel 9. Ownership of more than one channel by a single individual or company was allowed by the broadcasting laws at that time.

OVC already owned Radio Excelsior (frequency currently occupied by CBN) and therefore, it was determined that the name of the future TV station would bear the Excelsior name. "Excelso" is Portuguese for sublime. However, even before the launch of the station, it was bought by a group of businessmen led by the Simonsen family, owners of over 40 companies, the most famous of them being Panair do Brasil, then the country's largest airline company. The group featured entrepreneurs like José Luis Moura, a coffee exporter from Santos, Congressman Ortiz Monteiro, founder of TV Paulista, and John Scantimburgo, owner of the newspaper Correio Paulistano.

In its test phase, TV Excelsior aired documentary movies offered free of charge from foreign consulates, but changed its programming line to air more popular movies such as Bread, Love and Dreams. Even before its regular launch, the station was having an audience share of 5%.

TV Excelsior was acquired for ₢$80 million, an extremely high sum for the time. In addition to the station's license, the purchase also included broadcasting equipment, including cameras, a tower and a transmitter. The transmission system was installed at the corner of Consolação Street with Avenida Paulista, the studios were set on Avenida Adolfo Pinheiro, and the station's commercial and administrative center in Downtown São Paulo. On TV Excelsior, color broadcasting was done using NTSC between 1962-1963 to broadcast the 1962 World Cup and sports programs. In 1963, it conducted two full tests.

With the 1964 Brazilian coup d'état, TV Excelsior began to have problems with censorship. Programs such as those by Moacir Franco, Derci Gonçalves and Costinha were highly targeted, the scripts of soap operas were constantly censored and some had to be transferred after 10 pm. As a form of denunciation and protest, the excerpts cut from these programs were not reissued, in their place cartoon characters appeared with their mouths and ears covered and the caption “censored”.

TV Excelsior remained with good ratings and, in 1965, the program Moacir Franco show reached a rate of 77% of the audience in the city of São Paulo and 97% in the city of Santos. On the other hand, that was a year of serious problems for the other companies in the Simonsen group. This process ended with the seizure of the group's assets, including Rede Excelsior, which at the time was composed of broadcasters in São Paulo, Rio de Janeiro, Porto Alegre and Belo Horizonte. The group negotiated the debt in court and the broadcaster returned to the air.

Soon afterwards, officials from TV Excelsior tried to create a foundation to buy the station and took the proposal to the then President, Humberto Castelo Branco, who did not accept it, claiming that such a procedure was not permitted by law. So, Carlos Lacerda tried to stay with the Rio de Janeiro broadcaster, while, in São Paulo, Ademar de Barros wanted the São Paulo broadcaster. Both were governors and used the debts that the broadcasters owed to the states as an argument, but their proposals were not accepted by the federal government.

Still in 1965, TV Excelsior launched the 1st Brazilian Popular Music Festival, which had as its winning song Arrastão, music by Edu Lobo performed by Elis Regina. In the same year Mário Simonsen died in Paris. His son Wallace Simonsen then sold the station to Edson Leite, Alberto Saad, Otávio Frias and Carlos Caldeira (the last two were owners of the Folha da Manhã group of São Paulo newspapers). The station's direction was with Edson Leite and Alberto Saad.

Continuing investment in telenovelas, in 1966, in the midst of several internal crises, Excelsior launched the longest telenovela in the history of Brazilian television: Redenção. (Redemption) The novel was an original by Raimundo Lopes with 594 chapters, featuring Márcia Real, Flora Geni, Rodolfo Mayer, Vicente Leporace and Procópio Ferreira, among others. Redemption was in the air from May 1966 to May 1968.

In 1967, even though the broadcaster had a lot of debt, its new studio was opened in the São Paulo neighborhood of Vila Guilherme. The complex consisted of 12 studios, had 40 vehicles and more than five hundred employees worked on it. The Brazilian Television System (SBT) studios started to operate there later.

In its new studios, TV Excelsior produced Morro dos Ventos Uivantes, with scenes from the 19th century and adaptation by Lauro César Muniz, and O tempo eo vento, text by Érico Veríssimo adapted by Teixeira Filho and directed by Dionísio Azevedo. The latter was the final representative of a set of soap operas that the broadcaster presented at 21: 30h.

In 1968, financial problems escalated and many actors and directors, in the face of constant wage delays, were transferred to other broadcasters. Excelsior then began broadcasting a large number of North American serial films, while censorship continued to pursue its soap operas. With the enactment of Institutional Act No. 5, on December 13, 1968, the broadcaster took down the vanguard newspaper, as the pressures of censorship prevented the presentation of the type of reports that had, until then, characterized the program.

In 1969, the station produced the soap opera "Sangue do meu sangue", by Vicente Sesso, directed by Sérgio Brito. The cast included Francisco Cuoco, Fernanda Montenegro, Tônia Carreiro, Nicete Bruno, Henrique Martins, Nívea Maria, Armando Bogus, Mauro Mendonça and Rodolfo Mayer, among others.

The production of telenovelas, which had been one of the biggest brands of TV Excelsior (in 1963 the broadcaster broadcast three telenovelas; in 1964 it presented ten; and in 1965 it went to 17), from 1966 it started to decline. In 1969, the broadcaster presented only five productions of the genre.

In August 1969, a gale destroyed the tower of the Rio station, located in Sumaré. Amid a chaotic debt and layoff situation, the broadcaster's shares were repurchased by Wallace Simonsen. The Vila Guilherme property, where the studios were located, remained with Otávio Frias and Carlos Caldeiras.

The station's situation continued to worsen and Simonsen ended up selling his shares again. The buyer was Dorival Masci de Abreu, owner of Rádio Marconi, but Excelsior employees pushed for the deal to be undone and the shares returned to Simonsen.

== The end of TV Excelsior ==
On September 28, 1970, the broadcasting license was revoked and TV Excelsior came to an end on October 1, 1970, When Ferreira Neto invaded the station's studios, where he broadcast a humorous message to announce to the public that the government had decreed Excelsior's bankruptcy. At that time, some DENTEL technicians were at the technical center to take the station off the air. TV Excelsior comes to an end, after 10 years. Judicially, TV Excelsior had a maximum period of up to December 15, 1970, to settle the accounts with the government, that is, it would have to pay at least half of what it owes. However, the channel had not paid even 1% of the total debt, and with that the government revoked the concessions.

The broadcast of TV Excelsior in São Paulo ended at 18:40, shortly after the presentation of a farewell program.

In Rio de Janeiro, Channel 2's broadcasts ended a little earlier, at 5pm.

According to the presidential decree, the cassation was determined by breach of the Brazilian Telecommunications Code.

== Post-Excelsior ==
Five years after Rio's channel 2 went off the air, the Military Government won its own bid to broadcast an educational broadcaster, TVE Brasil, which associates with other public broadcasters. And then TVE became TV Brasil.

Thirteen years after the end of the station, Adolpho Bloch won the competition for the concession of VHF channel 9 in São Paulo, together with channel 6 in Rio. It was the start of Rede Manchete that later became RedeTV!. This became the only station to be a former Excelsior station; all other licenses Bloch acquired were former Tupi affiliates.

== Revival attempts ==
The Masci family still had the license of the dormant company. O Estado de S. Paulo reported in late 2013 that businessman Paulo Masci de Abreu was waiting for government approval (requested on 31 October 2013) to relaunch Excelsior. As of 2026, the company was headquartered in the Cinelândia neighborhood; Grupo Masci includes Excelsior in its brand portfolio, and requires an over-the-air or subscription television license.

== Network ==
- TV Excelsior São Paulo (channel 9, O&O)
- TV Excelsior Rio (channel 2, O&O)
- TV Alvorada (channel 8, Brasília, affiliated between 1967 and 1969, now Record Brasília)
- TV Anhanguera (channel 2, Goiânia, affiliated between 1963 and 1969, now a Globo affiliate)
- TV Centro América (channel 2, Cuiabá, affiliated between 1967 and 1969, now a Globo affiliate)
- TV Difusora (channel 4, São Luís, affiliated between 1966 and 1970, now an SBT affiliate)
- TV Gaúcha (channel 12, Porto Alegre, affiliated between 1963 and 1967, now RBS TV, a Globo affiliate)
- TV Jornal do Commercio (channel 2, Recife, affiliated between 1963 and 1970, later renamed TV Jornal and affiliated with Globo, Band and since 1987 currently with SBT)
- TV Morena (Channel 6, Campo Grande, affiliated between 1965 and 1969, now a Globo affiliate)
- TV Nacional (channel 3, Brasília, affiliated between 1963 and 1967, now a TV Brasil station on channel 2)
- TV Paranaense (channel 12, Curitiba, affiliated between 1965 and 1970, now RPC TV, a Globo affiliate)
- TV Triângulo (channel 8, Uberlândia, affiliated between 1964 and 1970, now TV Integração Uberlândia, a Globo affiliate)
- TV Vila Rica (channel 7, Belo Horizonte, affiliated between 1967–1970, now Band Minas
- TV Andorinha (channel 10, Campinas, replaced TV Excelsior relayer, active 1967–1970, likely closed along with the network)

== See also ==
- Rede Manchete - successor to Rede Excelsior and Rede Tupi
  - RedeTV! - successor to Rede Manchete
