= Band RS =

TV Bandeirantes Rio Grande do Sul (ZYP 329)
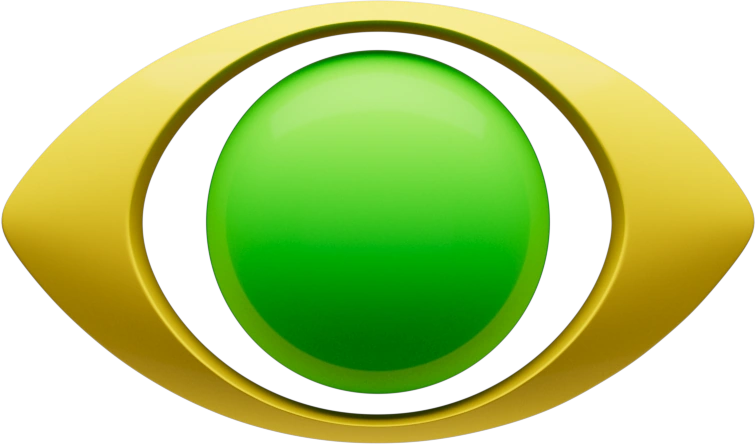
- Porto Alegre, Rio Grande do Sul; Brazil
- Channels: Digital: 32 (UHF); Virtual: 10
- Branding: Band RS

Programming
- Affiliations: Rede Bandeirantes

Ownership
- Owner: Grupo Bandeirantes de Comunicação; (Rádio e TV Portovisão Ltda.)
- Sister stations: Rádio Bandeirantes; BandNews FM; Play FM

History
- First air date: October 10, 1969
- Former call signs: ZYB 616 (1969-2018)
- Former names: TV Difusora (1969-1980)
- Former channel numbers: Analog: 10 (VHF, 1969-2018)
- Former affiliations: Independent (1969-1979)

Technical information
- Licensing authority: ANATEL
- ERP: 10 kW
- Transmitter coordinates: 30°4′47.2″S 51°10′56.2″W

Links
- Public license information: Profile
- Website: bandtv.band.uol.com.br/tv/rs

Band RS is a Brazilian television station based in Porto Alegre, capital of the state of Rio Grande do Sul. It operates on channel 10 (32 digital UHF) and is an owned-and-operated station of Band. Its studios are located at the Pontifical Catholic University of Rio Grande do Sul in the Tecnopuc complex, within the Partenon neighborhood, which is also the headquarters for Grupo Bandeirantes de Comunicação's entire operation in Rio Grande do Sul, and its transmitting antenna is situated on Morro da Polícia.

== History ==
The station emerged from the seed of Rádio Difusora, which had been inaugurated on October 27, 1934 by the Order of Friars Minor Capuchin, in a movement of missionary expansion of the evangelization project of the Catholic Church proposed by Pope Pius XI in the encyclical Rerum Ecclesiae. Sensitive to these appeals and inspired by the encyclicals Evangelii praecones of Pope Pius XII and Princeps pastorum of Pope John XXIII, the friars inaugurated TV Difusora on October 10, 1969.

The inauguration of TV Difusora was a organized event that was attended by the governor, Peracchi Barcelos, Cardinal Dom Vicente Scherer and President Emílio Garrastazu Médici. On that occasion, Médici made his first statement on television after being chosen president of the Federative Republic of Brazil. The channel's mascot was a lion, and the logo resembled a fan with the number 10 in the center.

On February 19, 1972, TV Difusora was the first Brazilian broadcaster to broadcast live, in color, directly from the celebration of the Grape Festival, in Caxias do Sul. It was a historic broadcast across the country, inaugurating a new moment in Brazilian television.

Local programming began with a 5-minute advice from a Capuchin priest. Soon after, imported series appeared, such as Bewitched and The Monkees. Competing with TV Gaúcha's Jornal do Almoço, the station aired Portovisão, which premiered on October 10, 1974, between 11:30am and 2:30pm. It began with a painting by Fernando Vieira, who presented news from the young world. Soon after came Tatata Pimentel, the first openly homosexual on television in Rio Grande do Sul, who told what was happening in the world of clubs, trends and high society in Porto Alegre. It followed the example of José Antônio Daudt, who, during the military dictatorship, theatrically demanded that the authorities, for example, not use official cars for private purposes, including broadcasting the "white" license plate numbers of the accused. He banged his fist on the table and spoke in a protesting voice. After Daudt, it was the turn of comedian Renato Pereira, who told jokes on air.

Lauro Quadros' sports commentary preceded the news from the world of sports, followed by Larry Pinto de Faria's commentary, while Sérgio Jockymann came before the news, which in the various phases of the program, was presented by Sérgio Schüeller, José Fontela, Magda Beatriz, Clóvis Duarte, among others. The end of the attraction was filled with interviews aimed at the female audience, presented by Tânia Carvalho. The last Portovisão, missing after the presenters left for TV Guaíba, aired in 1981, presented by Solange Bittencourt. The attraction was so important for the history of TV Difusora that, after the purchase by Rede Bandeirantes, it became the broadcaster's corporate name, Rádio e TV Portovisão Ltda.

TV Difusora had some children's programs, such as Recreio, presented by Tia Bita and child presenter Fabiano. It had a great educational highlight, the "Student Grade Ten" award, where gifts such as pens with the "I am a Grade Ten" seal were distributed to students who presented their report card with grades 10. The afternoons were filled with films, series and cartoons, and other local productions. At the end of the 70s, Discoteca 78 appeared (the following year, Discoteca 79), presented by Fernando Vieira, in the late afternoons. In 1980, then programming director Claro Gilberto launched Jornal da Mulher, presented by Maria Aparecida Vieira Souto and Tatata Pimentel, from Monday to Friday between 4pm and 5pm.

Evenings were marked by the news program Câmera 10, which had presenters such as Ana Amélia Lemos, Miss Universe Ieda Maria Vargas, Sérgio Schueller, José Fontela and Magda Beatriz. Camisa 10 was the broadcaster's sports program, presented right after the news. There were several presenters and commentators, such as João Carlos Belmonte, Lauro Quadros, Kenny Braga and Larry Pinto de Faria. During its first years, TV Difusora also had names such as Walmor Chagas, Moacyr Scliar, José Fogaça, Carlos Bastos, Ayrton Fagundes, Adroaldo Streck, Cascalho Contursi, Geraldo José de Almeida, among others.

In the 1970s, TV Difusora tried to establish its programming nationally, combined with the plan to make Porto Alegre a center of cultural production, as opposed to the Rio-São Paulo axis, where the national networks were based. This attempt took place in 1972, with the acquisition of controlling interest in TV Rio by OFM. However, due to financial problems, the broadcaster was closed down in 1977. Likewise, TV Difusora was no longer able to establish eminently local programming, and in 1979, it became affiliated with the recently created Rede Bandeirantes, which began to account for 30% of the programming.

The following year, on June 30, 1980, OFM sold TV Difusora and Rádio Difusora to Grupo Bandeirantes de Comunicação, which was interested in expanding its investments in the south of the country. From then on, the broadcaster was renamed TV Bandeirantes Rio Grande do Sul.

In 1981, the Rio Grande do Sul broadcaster launched a morning children's program with the magician Uncle Tony, called Carrossel Bandeirantes. The mornings ended with the police TV Cidade, presented by José Antônio Daudt and Solange Bittencourt. In the mid-1980s, the station's director, Paulo Solano, created a new version of Portovisão, inviting Clovis Duarte, Tatata Pimentel, José Antônio Daudt, Renato Pereira, Carlos Alberto Pires de Miranda, Xicão Tofani, Rosa Helena and Bibo Nunes to present Noon A Hora Local, which aired until 1:30 pm.

With the termination of the program to make way for the news program Chega, generated in São Paulo, and the sports program Esporte Total, also coming from the headquarters, a new attraction was created for 1pm, Sul TV, presented by Vera Armando. The wife of director Paulo Solano produced a morning variety program with an unusually long name, presented by Rosa Helena, Programa Feminino or "When women can say what they want without men interrupting". Probably the longest in the history of Brazilian television.

At the end of the 90s, the broadcaster hired the former presenter of Jornal do Almoço and former state deputy Maria do Carmo Bueno to present the program Lado a Lado, starting at 1 pm. Another local attraction that marked the 80s was Bandeirantes Receive, which aired on Saturday mornings, presented by Carmem Lucci.

On August 29, 2016, after 32 years at Grupo RBS, Paulo Brito joined Grupo Bandeirantes, where he participated in the sports program Os Donos da Bola, in addition to being a narrator for Rádio Bandeirantes, but he left the station in 2018.

On January 23, 2017, journalist Sérgio Cóssio, who worked for RBS TV and SBT Santa Catarina, was announced as Band's new general director in Rio Grande do Sul. He replaces Leonardo Meneghetti, who will go to São Paulo to head a nucleus that will work with Band's own network of broadcasters. In 2019, due to personal and health issues, he left the station, being temporarily replaced by Cláudio Giordani (director of the station in the interior of São Paulo) until September 10, when Leonardo Meneghetti returns to Band RS.

On December 26, 2019, chef and presenter Rodrigo Werner, who presented the program Truques de Cozinha, aired since May 2017, died.

On March 11, 2024, Grupo Bandeirantes in Rio Grande do Sul transferred its headquarters from the historic address in the Santo Antônio neighborhood, where it had been located since the beginning of its operations in 1980, to the Scientific and Technological Park of PUC-RS, Tecnopuc. On this day, all of its local programs premiered new scenarios.

== Technical information ==
Virtual	Digital channel	Aspect ratio	Content
10.1	32 UHF	1080i	Band RS/Band programming

Based on the federal decree transitioning Brazilian TV stations from analogue to digital signals, Band RS, as well as the other stations in Porto Alegre, ceased broadcasting on channel 10 VHF on March 14, 2018, following the official ANATEL roadmap. The switch-off took place at 11:59 pm, during the screening of the film Kingdom of Heaven, in the Quarta no Cinema session, which was replaced by a slide from MCTIC and ANATEL about the switch-off.
