= Band Minas =

TV Bandeirantes Minas (ZYQ 808)
- Belo Horizonte, Minas Gerais; Brazil
- Channels: Digital: 20 (UHF); Virtual: 7
- Branding: Band Minas

Programming
- Affiliations: Rede Bandeirantes

Ownership
- Owner: Grupo Bandeirantes de Comunicação; (Rádio e Televisão Bandeirantes de Minas Gerais Ltda.)
- Sister stations: BandNews FM Belo Horizonte

History
- First air date: March 2, 1967
- Former call signs: ZYA 720 (1967-2017)
- Former names: TV Vila Rica (1967-1975)
- Former channel numbers: Analog: 7 (VHF, 1967-2017)
- Former affiliations: TV Excelsior (1967-1970)

Technical information
- Licensing authority: ANATEL
- ERP: 15 kW
- Transmitter coordinates: 19°58′15.7″S 43°55′46″W

Links
- Public license information: Profile
- Website: band.com.br/minas-gerais

TV Bandeirantes Minas (channel 7, also known as Band Minas) is a Brazilian television station based in Belo Horizonte, capital of the state of Minas Gerais, carrying Rede Bandeirantes for most of the state. It was founded in 1967 as TV Vila Rica, being acquired by Grupo Bandeirantes de Comunicação in 1975. It covers most of the state, together with its co-sister Band Triângulo, located in Uberaba. Its studios are in the São Bento neighborhood, in the southern region of the capital of Minas Gerais, and its transmission antenna is in Serra do Curral, in Belvedere.

== History ==
TV Vila Rica was opened on March 2, 1967, based on a concession offered to Banco Real, with Simonsen receiving a part of the shares. Initially, it was affiliated with TV Excelsior, operating on channel 7 VHF, being part of the project to create a national network. However, due to several financial problems, in addition to troubled relations with the military government, Excelsior was taken off the air on September 30, 1970. With the network's extinction, TV Vila Rica began broadcasting TV Bandeirantes programming. On December 7, 1975, in the process of forming Rede Bandeirantes, TV Vila Rica was acquired by the São Paulo station, changing its name to TV Bandeirantes Minas in 1976.

The station airs approximately 16 hours of local programming per week. There is also Band Triângulo in the state, the second television station belonging to Grupo Bandeirantes de Comunicação, which broadcasts the group's programming to Triângulo Mineiro and Alto Paranaíba. Previously, in 2008, the region received programming from Band Minas, based in Belo Horizonte. With the creation of Band Triângulo, it took over the antennas previously occupied by Band Minas in the region, consolidating the presence of Grupo Bandeirantes in this specific area.

This redistribution strengthened the offer of diverse and relevant television content for the public in Triângulo Mineiro and Alto Paranaíba.

== Technical information ==
Virtual channel	Digital channel	Screen	Content
7.1	20 UHF	1080i	Band Minas/Band's main schedule

Based on the federal decree transitioning Brazilian TV stations from analogue to digital signals, Band Minas, as well as other stations in Belo Horizonte, ceased broadcasting on channel 7 VHF on November 22, 2017, following the official ANATEL roadmap. The signal was cut off at 11:59 pm, during the Cine Band film session, being replaced by a slide from MCTIC and ANATEL about the switch-off.
