= Samuel (footballer, born 1974) =

Brazilian footballer

Personal information
- Full name: Samuel José da Silva Vieira
- Date of birth: 14 October 1974 (age 52)
- Place of birth: Coração de Maria, Brazil
- Height: 1.82 m (5 ft 11 1/2 in)
- Position: Centre-back

Team information
- Current team: Bahia de Feira

Senior career*
Years	Team	Apps	(Gls)
1994–1999	Bahia		
2001	Caxias do Sul	3	(0)
2001–2002	Perugia	2	(0)
2003	Criciúma	0	(0)
2003	Santa Cruz		
2003–2005	Caxias do Sul	32	(2)
2005	União São João	3	(0)
2006	Glória	0	(0)
2006	CFZ do Rio	0	(0)
2006	→ CRB (loan)	6	(0)
2007	Tupi	0	(0)
2008, 2009	São José de Porto Alegre	0	(0)
2010	Atlético de Alagoinhas	0	(0)
2011	Bahia de Feira	0	(0)
- * Club domestic league appearances and goals

Samuel José da Silva Vieira (born 14 October 1974) is a former Brazilian footballer who played for Bahia de Feira. Samuel spent his early career in Campeonato Brasileiro Série A, then moved to Perugia of Italian first division before spent rest of his career in Brazilian lower divisions.

== Biography ==
=== Bahia ===
Born in Coração de Maria, Bahia state, Samuel made his Campeonato Brasileiro Série A debut on 28 August 1994, for Esporte Clube Bahia. Since then he played 40 times in Campeonato Brasileiro Série A. He followed the team relegated to 1998 Campeonato Brasileiro Série B.

=== Caxias do Sul ===
He played the first 3 games of 2001 Campeonato Brasileiro Série B.

=== Perugia ===
In August 2001 he left for Italian Serie A club Perugia. He made his league debut on 28 October 2001 (round 9), winning Piacenza 1–0. He replaced Sean Sogliano in the first half. Samuel made his first start in the next round. He also played for the team in 2001–02 Coppa Italia.

=== Return to Brazil ===
In February 2003 he returned to Brazil for Criciúma. In March he left for Santa Cruz. He then left for Caxias do Sul. In 2004, he was the starting defender of Caxias do Sul, only missed round 8 to 10 and round 20, which 2 of them were automatic suspension for third and sixth caution (yellow card) of the season. Samuel renewed his contract with Caxias do Sul on 16 December 2004 for another year. He played the first 8 matches of 2005 Campeonato Brasileiro Série B as starting defender and again in round 11 and 12. On 25 July 2005 he left for União São João until the end of 2005 Campeonato Brasileiro Série C, which he played the first 3 rounds of the league.

On 7 December 2005 he was signed by Glória until the end of 2006 Campeonato Gaúcho. On 23 August 2006 he left for CFZ do Rio, for a playoffs round to qualify for 2007 Campeonato Carioca. CFZ exited in the first round. On 21 September 2006 he was signed by CRB, played 6 out of last 9 games of 2006 Campeonato Brasileiro Série B.

=== Late career ===
In January 2007 he left for Tupi until the end of 2007 Campeonato Mineiro, which he was the starting defender in the first 6 games. He then played for São José de Porto Alegre in 2008 and 2009 Campeonato Gaúcho, however he did not contracted to play in 2008 and 2009 Copa FGF of the second half of year. In 2010, he left for Atlético de Alagoinhas until the end of 2010 Campeonato Baiano. On 13 January 2011, he was signed by Bahia de Feira.

== Career statistics ==
Club performance			League		Cup		League Cup		Total	
Season	Club	League	Apps	Goals	Apps	Goals	Apps	Goals	Apps	Goals
Brazil			League		Copa do Brasil		League Cup		Total	
1994	Bahia	Série A	19	0	0	0	?	?	?	?
1995	Bahia	Série A	9	0	1	0	?	?	?	?
1996	Bahia	Série A	13	0	3	0	?	?	?	?
1997	Bahia	Série A	0	0	2	0	?	?	?	?
1998	Bahia	Série B			1	0	?	?	?	?
1999	Bahia	Série C			1	0	?	?	?	?
2000	?									
2001	Caxias do Sul	Série B	3	0	2	0	12	0	17	0
Italy			League		Coppa Italia		League Cup		Total	
2001–02	Perugia	Serie A	2	0	2	0			4	0
Brazil			League		Copa do Brasil		League Cup		Total	
2003	Criciúma	Série A	0	0	0	0	?	?	?	?
2003	Santa Cruz	Série B					?	?	?	?
2003	Caxias do Sul	Série B	3	0					3	0
2004	Caxias do Sul	Série B	19	2			6	2	25	4
2005	Caxias do Sul	Série B	10	0			13	4	23	4
2005	União São João	Série C	3	0					3	0
2006	Glória	Regional (RS)					?	?	?	?
2006	CFZ do Rio	Regional (RJ2)					?	?	?	?
2006	CRB	Série B	6	0					6	0
2007	Tupi	Regional (MG)					7	0	7	0
2008	São José (PA)	Regional (RS)					?	?	?	?
2009	São José (PA)	Regional (RS)					12	2	12	2
2010	Atlético (BA)	Regional (BA)					8	0	8	0
2011	Bahia de Feira	Regional (BA)					0	0	0	0
Total	Brazil		?	?	10	0	?	?	?	?
Total	Italy		2	0	2	0			4	0
Career total			?	?	12	0	?	?	?	?

- Note: State Leagues are marked as League Cup.
