= 2009 Brasil de Pelotas bus disaster =

2009 Brasil de Pelotas bus accident

Brasil de Pelotas Bus Disaster
- Location within Rio Grande do Sul Location within Brazil

Details
- Date: 15 January 2009 c. 23:00 p.m. BRT
- Location: BR-392, Canguçu, Rio Grande do Sul
- Coordinates: 31.39143664360661°S 52.69634592716702°W
- Country: Brazil
- Incident type: rollover
- Cause: loss of control on a dangerous curve

Statistics
- Vehicles: 1
- Deaths: 3
- Injured: 28

2009 Brasil de Pelotas bus disaster was a bus accident that occurred on 15 January 2009, which killed three members of the Grêmio Esportivo Brasil (Brasil de Pelotas) delegation, who were returning from the city of Vale do Sol after a friendly match against Futebol Clube Santa Cruz.

== Accident ==
To prepare for the 2009 Campeonato Gaúcho, the club's then-coach, Armando Desessards, requested a preseason friendly to the club's director. On 15 January, a match against FC Santa Cruz took place in Vale do Sol, with GE Brasil winning by 2–1.

On the way back to Pelotas, around 11:00 pm, the bus carrying the club delegation with 31 people overturned while speeding around a sharp curve on the connection between highways BR-471 and BR-392, in the city of Canguçu. According to the Federal Highway Police's investigation, the bus fell from a height of 40 meters, equivalent to a 15-story building, completely overturning at least four times.

Players Cláudio Milar (34) and Régis Gouveia (28), as well the goalkeeper coach Giovani Guimarães (40), died during the rollover. Another 28 people were injured to varying degrees. One of the players at time, Odair suffered severe spinal trauma and was forced to retire a few months later. Danrlei, who was Brasil de Pelotas' big signing for the season, stated in an interview with ESPN in 2023 that he has never been on a bus again since the accident. The defender Alex Martins, who was sitting next to Régis, said that the driver had already left the road a few times on the team's journey to the match in Vale do Sol. Uruguayan from the city of Chuy, Milar was one of the main players in the history of GE Brasil, having scored more than 100 goals for the club.

== Aftermath ==
In addition to Odair, Brasil de Pelotas lost the following injured players for the state championship: Edu, Xuxa, Uendel, Alemão and Rafael Gaúcho, The coach Armando Desessards also claimed he was unable to continue in charge of the team. On the same day, Claudio Duarte offers to train Brazil for free. The Federação Gaúcha de Futebol postponed the club's debut in Campeonato Gaúcho by 16 days so the club could restructure its squad. Even so, the team faced serious problems during the competition and ended up being relegated. The player Eliandro also highlighted the psychological terror the group suffered with the return of the competition, and as a consequence of the bus trips, where the players' emotional state was completely compromised.

In May 2013, Regis Gouveia's family received R$ 80,000 in compensation from the state court, along with the transport company that owned the bus. In 2014, the driver Wendel Vergara was sentenced to three years and two months in prison for manslaughter. As a first-time offender, Vergara was released on bail and served community service.

After relegation from the state championship, GE Brasil still had the 2009 Campeonato Brasileiro Série B ahead of them, managing to re-establish itself for the rest of the season, finishing in 9th place. The club remained in the second national level until 2019. Through the state championship, the club returned to the elite, winning the Campeonato Gaúcho Série A2 in 2013.

In 2025, Claudio's son, Agustín Milar, was selected by Brasil de Pelotas as a professional for the first time in the 2025 Campeonato Gaúcho.

== See also ==
- 2024 Minas Gerais road crash
- LaMia Flight 2933
