= 2009 Campeonato Gaúcho =

Campeonato Gaúcho
- Season: 2009
- Champions: Internacional
- Runner up: Grêmio
- Relegated: Sapucaiense and Brasil
- Top goalscorer: Taison (Internacional), 15 goals
- Biggest home win: Internacional 8–1 Caxias (Taça Fábio Koff Final, April 19)
- Biggest away win: Brasil 0–7 Internacional (Taça Fábio Koff First Stage, March 10)

The 89th season of the Campeonato Gaúcho kicked off on January 20 and ended on April 19. Repeating the 2008 final score, Internacional clinched their 39th title – second consecutive – after beating Caxias 8–1 in the Taça Fábio Koff final. As Internacional had already won Taça Fernando Carvalho, beating city rivals Grêmio 2–1 in the final, Campeonato Gaúcho finals were unnecessary.

The competition had 16 clubs divided into two groups. In the first part, called Taça Fernando Carvalho teams from one group played against teams from the other group. In the second part, called Taça Fábio Koff, clubs played inside their group. On both parts, top four teams from each group qualified to play-offs, when every round was decided in a single game. Winners of each part were supposed to play finals, but as Internacional won both, they were declared champions without it.

== Teams ==
Club	City	Pos. in 2008	Number of Titles (until 2008)
Internacional	Porto Alegre	Champions	38
Juventude	Caxias do Sul	Runners-up	1
Internacional (SM)	Santa Maria	3rd	–
Caxias	Caxias do Sul	4th	1
Grêmio	Porto Alegre	5th	35
Sapucaiense	Sapucaia do Sul	6th	–
São José	Porto Alegre	7th	–
Ulbra	Canoas	8th	–
Esportivo	Bento Gonçalves	9th	–
São Luiz	Ijuí	10th	–
Veranópolis	Veranópolis	11th	–
Novo Hamburgo	Novo Hamburgo	12th	–
Brasil	Pelotas	13th	1
Santa Cruz	Santa Cruz do Sul	14th	–
Ypiranga	Erechim	2nd Level champions	–
Avenida	Santa Cruz do Sul	2nd Level runners-up	–

== System ==
The 16 clubs will be divided into two groups.

Group 1: Internacional, Juventude, Avenida, Esportivo, Veranópolis, Brasil and Internacional (SM);
Group 2: Grêmio, Caxias, Santa Cruz, Ypiranga, Ulbra, Sapucaiense, São José and São Luiz.

The tournament will be divided in two stages. In the first one, called Taça Fernando Carvalho (Fernando Carvalho Cup, in reference to former Internacional chairman, winner of the 2006 Copa Libertadores and FIFA Club World Cup), teams from one group will play in single round-robin format against clubs of the other group. Top four teams in each group advance to quarterfinals. In home-and-away system, winners qualify to semifinals and then, to the finals. Later, in Taça Fábio Koff (Fábio Koff Cup, in reference to former Grêmio chairman, winner of the 1983 Intercontinental Cup, 1983 and 1995 Copa Libertadores), teams in the same group will play each other once. Again, top four teams will play quarterfinals, winners play semifinals and then finals. If the same club wins both stages, they will be declared champions. Otherwise, a final will be disputed in home-and-away system.

== Background ==
On January 15, just one week before its debut in the championship, a bus carrying all Brasil squad crashed in the 150th kilometer of the BR-392 road, in the city of Canguçu, southern Rio Grande do Sul. The team was heading back to Pelotas after beating Santa Cruz 2–1 in a friendly match played in Vale do Sol, near Santa Cruz do Sul. The bus plunged off a 130-foot ravine after the driver lost its control when approaching a turn. The accident caused the death of three members of the team: goalkeeper trainer Giovani Guimarães, defender Régis Gouveia and striker Claudio Milar. Milar is considered to be one of the most notable players in the history of the club, scoring 110 goals in approximately 200 caps. Several other players sustained injuries. Among the injured was Copa Libertadores 1995 winner and 1996 Olympic bronze-medalist Danrlei.

After the disaster, several clubs offered to loan players for free in order to help Brasil to play in the tournament. Also, companies as Multisom and Banrisul signed special sponsorship deals to provide financial support. On January 19, club managers and the Rio Grande do Sul Football Federation decided that Brasil should skip their first 5 matches, debuting on February 3 against Santa Cruz.

== Taça Fernando Carvalho ==
=== Group A ===
==== Standings ====
Pos	Team	Pld	W	D	L	GF	GA	GD	Pts	Qualification
1	Internacional	8	6	2	0	19	4	+15	20	to Quarterfinals
2	Veranópolis	8	4	0	4	13	15	−2	12	to Quarterfinals
3	Novo Hamburgo	8	3	3	2	10	11	−1	12	to Quarterfinals
4	Juventude	8	3	2	3	5	5	0	11	to Quarterfinals
5	Esportivo	8	2	4	2	9	13	−4	10	
6	Avenida	8	2	3	3	13	15	−2	9	
7	Internacional (SM)	8	1	2	5	7	14	−7	5	
8	Brasil	8	0	3	5	10	21	−11	3	

=== Group B ===
==== Standings ====
Pos	Team	Pld	W	D	L	GF	GA	GD	Pts	Qualification
1	Grêmio	8	5	1	2	20	8	+12	16	to Quarterfinals
2	Ypiranga	8	5	1	2	13	8	+5	16	to Quarterfinals
3	Santa Cruz	8	3	4	1	11	6	+5	13	to Quarterfinals
4	Ulbra	8	3	4	1	14	10	+4	13	to Quarterfinals
5	São Luiz	8	3	2	3	6	7	−1	11	
6	São José	8	2	2	4	16	18	−2	8	
7	Caxias	8	2	2	4	8	13	−5	8	
8	Sapucaiense	8	1	3	4	11	17	−6	6	

=== Results ===
Home \ Away	AVE	BRA	ESP	INT	ISM	JUV	NH	VER	CAX	GRE	SCZ	SJO	SLU	SAP	ULB	YPI
Avenida									1–0	1–2	1–3	3–3	3–1	2–2	0–0	2–4
Brasil									1–2	0–3	3–3	1–1	0–2	2–2	2–5	1–3
Esportivo									0–0	0–5	1–1	3–2	1–1	3–2	0–0	1–2
Internacional									5–1	2–1 (Note: Match played in neutral ground (Erechim))	0–0	3–1	1–0	4–0	4–1	0–0
Internacional (SM)									2–4	1–1	0–0	1–3	0–1	1–2	0–3	2–0
Juventude									0–0	0–2	1–0	1–2	2–0	1–0	0–0	0–1
Novo Hamburgo									2–0	1–5	0–1	2–1	0–0	1–1	2–2	2–1
Veranópolis									2–1	3–1	0–3	3–2	0–1	3–2	2–3	0–2
Caxias	0–1	2–1	0–0	1–5	4–2	0–0	0–2	1–2								
Grêmio	2–1	3–0	5–0	1–2	1–1	2–0	5–1	1–3								
Santa Cruz	3–1	3–3	1–1	0–0	0–0	0–1	1–0	3–0								
São José	3–3	1–1	2–3	1–3	3–1	2–1	1–2	2–3								
São Luiz	1–3	2–0	1–1	0–1	1–0	0–2	0–0	1–0								
Sapucaiense	2–2	2–2	2–3	0–4	2–1	0–1	1–1	2–3								
Ulbra	0–0	5–2	0–0	1–4	3–0	0–0	2–2	3–2								
Ypiranga	4–2	3–1	2–1	0–0	0–2	1–0	1–2	2–0								

Legend: Blue = home team win; Yellow = draw; Red = away team win.

=== Playoffs ===
Quarter-finals
February 22 – Beira-Rio, Porto Alegre
Internacional*	2
Ulbra	1
February 22 – Colosso da Lagoa, Erechim
Ypiranga*	0
Novo Hamburgo	3
February 21 – Olímpico, Porto Alegre
Grêmio*	2
Juventude	0
February 21 – Antônio D. Farina, Veranópolis
Veranópolis*	2
Santa Cruz	1

Semi-finals
February 26 – Beira-Rio, Porto Alegre
Internacional*	2
Novo Hamburgo	0
February 27 – Olímpico, Porto Alegre
Grêmio*	1
Veranópolis	0

Final
March 1 – Beira-Rio, Porto Alegre
Internacional*	2
Grêmio	1

* Homeground advantage

==== The Final ====
March 1st, 2009

Internacional	2–1	Grêmio
Índio 47'; Magrão 77'	Report	Alex Mineiro 59'

Estádio Beira-Rio, Porto Alegre
Attendance: 28,436
Referee: Leonardo Gaciba

== Taça Fábio Koff ==
=== Group A ===
==== Standings ====
Pos	Team	Pld	W	D	L	GF	GA	GD	Pts	Qualification
1	Internacional	7	6	1	0	28	6	+22	19	to Quarterfinals
2	Veranópolis	7	4	1	2	10	8	+2	13	to Quarterfinals
3	Internacional (SM)	7	4	1	2	9	9	0	13	to Quarterfinals
4	Juventude	7	3	3	1	11	7	+4	12	to Quarterfinals
5	Avenida	7	3	0	4	7	10	−3	9	
6	Esportivo	7	1	2	4	9	19	−10	5	
7	Novo Hamburgo	7	1	1	5	7	11	−4	4	
8	Brasil	7	1	1	5	7	18	−11	4	

==== Results ====
Home \ Away	AVE	BRA	ESP	INT	ISM	JUV	NH	VER
Avenida		3–2	3–1	0–1	0–3	0–1	1–0	0–2
Brasil	2–3		1–2	0–7	2–3	0–0	1–0	1–3
Esportivo	1–3	2–1		2–6	1–2	2–2	0–4	1–1
Internacional	3–0	7–0	6–2		1–0	3–3	4–1	4–0
Internacional (SM)	1–0	3–2	2–1	0–1		0–3	1–1	2–1
Juventude	1–0	0–0	2–2	3–3	3–0		2–1	0–1
Novo Hamburgo	0–1	0–1	4–0	1–4	1–1	1–2		0–2
Veranópolis	2–0	3–1	1–1	0–4	1–2	1–0	2–0	

Legend: Blue = home team win; Yellow = draw; Red = away team win.

=== Group B ===
==== Standings ====
Pos	Team	Pld	W	D	L	GF	GA	GD	Pts	Qualification
1	Santa Cruz	7	4	0	3	13	12	+1	12	to Quarterfinals
2	Ulbra	7	3	3	1	11	9	+2	12	to Quarterfinals
3	Caxias	7	3	2	2	16	10	+6	11	to Quarterfinals
4	Grêmio	7	3	2	2	14	10	+4	11	to Quarterfinals
5	São José	7	3	2	2	11	15	−4	11	
6	Ypiranga	7	2	4	1	11	9	+2	10	
7	Sapucaiense	7	2	0	5	10	17	−7	6	
8	São Luiz	7	1	1	5	5	9	−4	4	

==== Results ====
Home \ Away	CAX	GRE	SCZ	SJO	SLU	SAP	ULB	YPI
Caxias		4–0	1–2	3–4	2–1	3–0	2–2	1–1
Grêmio	0–4		2–3	6–1	2–0	2–0	1–1	1–1
Santa Cruz	2–1	3–2		2–0	0–2	2–1	1–2	3–4
São José	4–3	1–6	0–2		1–0	3–2	1–1	1–1
São Luiz	1–2	0–2	2–0	0–1		1–2	0–1	1–1
Sapucaiense	0–3	0–2	1–2	2–3	2–1		4–3	1–3
Ulbra	2–2	1–1	2–1	1–1	1–0	3–4		1–0
Ypiranga	1–1	1–1	4–3	1–1	1–1	3–1	0–1	

Legend: Blue = home team win; Yellow = draw; Red = away team win.

=== Playoffs ===
Quarter-finals
April 5 – Beira-Rio, Porto Alegre
Internacional*	2
Grêmio	1
April 5 – Complexo Esportivo, Canoas
Ulbra*	2
Internacional (SM)	0
April 5 – Plátanos, S. Cruz do Sul
Santa Cruz*	1
Juventude	2
April 5 – Antônio D. Farina, Veranópolis
Veranópolis*	1
Caxias	3

Semi-finals
April 12 – Beira-Rio, Porto Alegre
Internacional*	4
Ulbra	0
April 12 – Alfredo Jaconi, Caxias do Sul
Caxias	2
Juventude*	0

Final
April 19 – Beira-Rio, Porto Alegre
Internacional*	8
Caxias	1

* Homeground advantage

==== Final ====
April 19, 2009

Internacional	8–1	Caxias
Magrão 7', 40'; Taison 15'; Nilmar 18', 22'; Guiñazú 32'; D'Alessandro 43'; Álvaro 87'	Report	Cristian Borja 66'

Estádio Beira-Rio, Porto Alegre
Referee: Leandro Vuaden

== Finals ==
Finals were scheduled to be played on April 26 & May 3, but as Internacional won both Taça Fernando Carvalho and Taça Fábio Koff, finals became unnecessary.

== Overall table ==
Considering only group matches of both Fernando Carvalho and Fábio Koff trophies, the bottom two teams in overall table will be relegated to play lower levels in 2010.

Pos	Team	Pld	W	D	L	GF	GA	GD	Pts	Relegation
1	Internacional	15	12	3	0	47	10	+37	39	
2	Grêmio	15	8	3	4	34	18	+16	27	
3	Ypiranga	15	7	5	3	24	17	+7	26	
4	Veranópolis	15	8	1	6	23	23	0	25	
5	Santa Cruz	15	7	4	4	24	18	+6	25	
6	Ulbra	15	6	7	2	25	19	+6	25	
7	Juventude	15	6	5	4	16	12	+4	23	
8	Caxias	15	5	4	6	24	23	+1	19	
9	São José	15	5	4	6	27	33	−6	19	
10	Avenida	15	5	3	7	20	25	−5	18	
11	Internacional (SM)	15	5	3	7	16	24	−8	18	
12	Novo Hamburgo	15	4	4	7	17	22	−5	16	
13	São Luiz	15	4	3	8	11	16	−5	15	
14	Esportivo	15	3	6	6	18	32	−14	15	
15	Sapucaiense	15	3	3	9	21	34	−13	12	to Lower Levels in 2010
16	Brasil	15	1	4	10	17	39	−22	7	to Lower Levels in 2010
