= Odair Hellmann =

Brazilian footballer

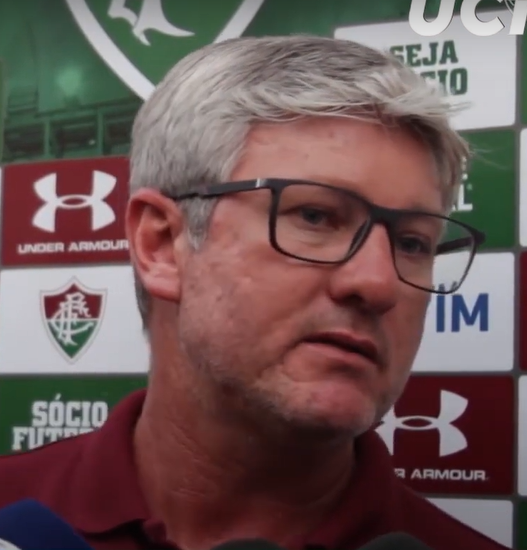
- Hellmann in 2020

Personal information
- Date of birth: 22 January 1977 (age 49)
- Place of birth: Salete, Brazil
- Position: Defensive midfielder

Team information
- Current team: Athletico Paranaense (head coach)

Youth career
- 1990–1998: Internacional

Senior career*
Years	Team	Apps	(Gls)
1997–2000	Internacional	20	(0)
1999	→ Fluminense (loan)	17	(1)
2001	Veranópolis	8	(1)
2001	América de Natal	0	(0)
2002	Mamoré	0	(0)
2003	Brasil de Pelotas	11	(1)
2003	Enköping	3	(0)
2004	America-RJ	4	(0)
2005–2006	Remo	37	(2)
2007	CRB	3	(0)
2007–2008	Eastern	7	(0)
2009	Brasil de Pelotas	0	(0)

International career
1997	Brazil U20	1	(0)

Managerial career
- 2006: Remo (interim)
- 2010–2012: Internacional U17
- 2013–2017: Internacional (assistant)
- 2015: Internacional (interim)
- 2016: Brazil U23 (assistant)
- 2017: Internacional (interim)
- 2017: Internacional (interim)
- 2017–2019: Internacional
- 2020: Fluminense
- 2020–2022: Al Wasl
- 2023: Santos
- 2023–2024: Al-Riyadh
- 2024–2025: Al-Raed
- 2025–: Athletico Paranaense
- * Club domestic league appearances and goals

Odair Hellmann (born 22 January 1977) is a Brazilian football coach and former player who played as a defensive midfielder. He is the current head coach of Athletico Paranaense.

== Playing career ==
Born in Salete, Santa Catarina, Odair was an Internacional youth graduate. He made his first team debut on 8 March 1997, coming on as a substitute in a 1–1 Campeonato Gaúcho away draw against Grêmio Santanense. After winning the 1998 Copa São Paulo de Futebol Júnior with the under-20 side, he was definitely promoted to the main squad, and featured more during that year.

Odair was loaned to Fluminense in the Série C for the 1999 season. Upon returning, he was released by the club, and played for Veranópolis in the 2001 Campeonato Gaúcho. He was also a part of the América de Natal squad in the 2001 Série B, but never featured in a single minute.

In 2002, Odair joined Mamoré as the club was playing in the Copa Sul-Minas, and made his debut against former club Internacional. He started the 2003 campaign at Brasil de Pelotas before moving abroad with Swedish Allsvenskan side Enköpings SK in July; he suffered an injury while training, staying two months sidelined at the latter and subsequently only playing rarely.

Odair returned to Brazil in 2004, after agreeing to a contract with America-RJ. He moved to Remo in the following year, and helped the side to win the third division. After losing his starting spot in 2006, he was also an interim coach for a brief period after Artur Neto was sacked, managing the club in one match before returning to his player status.

After a brief period at CRB (where he struggled with injuries), Odair represented Hong Kong First Division League club Eastern SC in the 2007–08 season. He returned to Brasil de Pelotas in December 2008, and was among the squad which suffered the 2009 Brasil de Pelotas bus disaster. He suffered minor back injuries from the accident, which he fully recovered in October of that year, but still opted to retire.

== Managerial career ==
=== Internacional ===
After retiring, Hellmann started working as an assistant manager at his former club Internacional, initially assigned to the under-17 squad. In 2013, he became the permanent assistant manager of the first team. In 2015, he was also in charge of the first team for two matches, replacing fired Diego Aguirre.

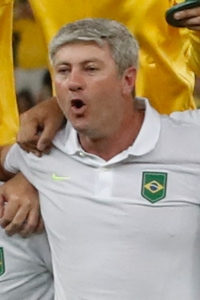
Hellmann celebrating the Gold Medal with the Brazil national under-23 team in the 2016 Summer Olympics

Ahead of the 2016 Summer Olympics, Hellmann worked as Rogério Micale's assistant in the Brazil under-23 squad, helping the side to achieve the gold medal for the first time in history. Upon returning to Inter, he was appointed interim manager on 11 November 2017, after the dismissal of Guto Ferreira; he also previously worked in that capacity for one match in May, after the dismissal of Antônio Carlos Zago.

On 25 November 2017, Hellmann was announced as manager of the club for the 2018 season. After qualifying for the 2019 Copa Libertadores, he remained as manager for the 2019 season, as they went on to reach the finals in the 2019 Copa do Brasil, but lost it to Athletico Paranaense.

On 10 October 2019, after being knocked out by Flamengo in the Libertadores quarterfinals and a streak of four games without a league win, Hellmann was dismissed by Internacional.

=== Fluminense ===
On 11 December 2019, Hellmann was appointed manager of another of his former clubs, Fluminense. He reached the 2020 Campeonato Carioca finals, but lost to Flamengo.

On 7 December 2020, Hellmann left Fluminense after receiving an offer from Emirati club Al-Wasl, and was replaced by assistant Marcão.

=== Al-Wasl ===
Hellmann was confirmed as manager of Al-Wasl on 8 December 2020. He rescinded his contract with the club on 27 June 2022, after finishing in the sixth position in the 2021–22 UAE Pro League.

=== Santos ===
On 16 November 2022, Hellmann was named manager of Santos back in his home country, and signed a one-year contract. He left on a mutual agreement on 22 June 2023, after a 2–0 home loss to Corinthians.

=== Al-Riyadh ===
On 8 October 2023, Hellmann was appointed as manager of Saudi Pro League club Al-Riyadh until the end of the 2023–24 season.

=== Al-Raed ===
On 14 July 2024, Hellmann was appointed as manager of Saudi Pro League club Al-Raed.

=== Athletico Paranaense ===
On 21 May 2025, Hellmann returned to his home country and was appointed Athletico Paranaense head coach in the second division.

== Career statistics ==
Appearances and goals by club, season and competition
Club	Season	League			State League		Cup		Continental		Other		Total	
Club	Season	Division	Apps	Goals	Apps	Goals	Apps	Goals	Apps	Goals	Apps	Goals	Apps	Goals
Internacional	1997	Série A	4	0	5	0	0	0	—		—		9	0
Internacional	1998	Série A	3	0	8	0	1	0	—		—		12	0
Internacional	2000	Série A	0	0	0	0	0	0	—		—		0	0
Internacional	Total		7	0	13	0	1	0	—		—		21	0
Fluminense (loan)	1999	Série C	6	1	11	0	2	0	—		—		19	1
Veranópolis	2001	Gaúcho	—		8	1	—		—		—		8	1
América de Natal	2001	Série B	0	0	—		—		—		—		0	0
Mamoré	2002	Mineiro	—		0	0	—		—		8 (Note: Appearance(s) in Copa Sul-Minas)	0	8	0
Brasil de Pelotas	2003	Série C	0	0	11	1	—		—		—		11	1
Enköping	2003	Allsvenskan	3	0	—		—		—		—		3	0
America-RJ	2004	Série C	0	0	4	0	—		—		—		4	0
Remo	2005	Série C	10	0	15	1	1	0	—		—		26	1
Remo	2006	Série B	0	0	12	1	2	0	—		—		14	1
Remo	Total		10	0	27	2	3	0	—		—		40	2
CRB	2007	Série B	0	0	3	0	—		—		—		3	0
Eastern	2007–08	First Division League	7	0	—		—		—		—		7	0
Brasil de Pelotas	2009	Gaúcho	—		0	0	—		—		—		0	0
Career total			33	1	77	4	6	0	0	0	8	0	124	5

== Managerial statistics ==
As of 18 November 2026.

Managerial record by team and tenure
Team	Nat	From	To	Record								Ref
Team	Nat	From	To	G	W	D	L	GF	GA	GD	Win %	Ref
Remo (interim)	(Brazil)	16 July 2006	21 July 2006	1	0	0	1	0	3	−3	0.00	
Internacional (interim)	(Brazil)	7 August 2015	12 August 2015	2	1	0	1	1	5	−4	50.00	
Internacional (interim)	(Brazil)	28 May 2017	31 May 2017	1	1	0	0	2	1	+1	100.00	
Internacional (interim)	(Brazil)	12 November 2017	25 November 2017	3	2	1	0	4	0	+4	66.67	
Internacional	(Brazil)	25 November 2017	10 October 2019	116	61	27	28	151	89	+62	52.59	
Fluminense	(Brazil)	11 December 2019	7 December 2020	48	23	11	14	73	46	+27	47.92	
Al Wasl	(United Arab Emirates)	8 December 2020	28 June 2022	60	22	19	19	93	80	+13	36.67	
Santos	(Brazil)	16 November 2022	22 June 2023	34	11	11	12	34	33	+1	32.35	
Al-Riyadh	(Saudi Arabia)	8 October 2023	1 June 2024	25	6	9	10	25	36	−11	24.00	
Al-Raed	(Saudi Arabia)	14 July 2024	8 March 2025	27	7	4	16	31	44	−13	25.93	
Athletico Paranaense	(Brazil)	21 May 2025	present	77	35	18	24	106	87	+19	45.45	
Total				394	169	101	124	520	424	+96	42.89	—

== Honours ==
=== Player ===
Internacional

- Campeonato Gaúcho: 1997

Fluminense

- Campeonato Brasileiro Série C: 1999

Remo

- Campeonato Brasileiro Série C: 2005

=== Assistant manager ===
Brazil Olympic

- Summer Olympics Gold medal: 2016
