= RBS TV Pelotas =

RBS TV Pelotas (ZYB 617)
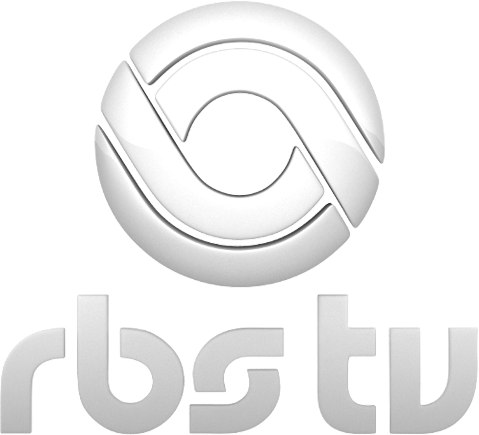
- Pelotas, Rio Grande do Sul; Brazil
- Channels: Digital: 24 (UHF); Virtual: 4

Programming
- Affiliations: TV Globo

Ownership
- Owner: Grupo RBS; (Televisão Tuiuti S.A.)

History
- Founded: July 5, 1972
- Former names: TV Tuiuti (1972–1983)
- Former channel numbers: Analog: 4 (VHF, 1972–2018); Digital: 34 (UHF, 2013–2024)

Technical information
- Licensing authority: ANATEL
- Transmitter coordinates: 31°45′08.5″S 52°18′49.4″W

Links
- Website: redeglobo.globo.com/rs/rbstvrs

RBS TV Pelotas (channel 4) is a television station in Pelotas, Rio Grande do Sul, Brazil, affiliated with TV Globo, member of RBS TV and owned by Grupo RBS. RBS TV Pelotas' studios and transmitter are located on Hipólito José da Costa Street, in the Areal neighborhood.

== History ==
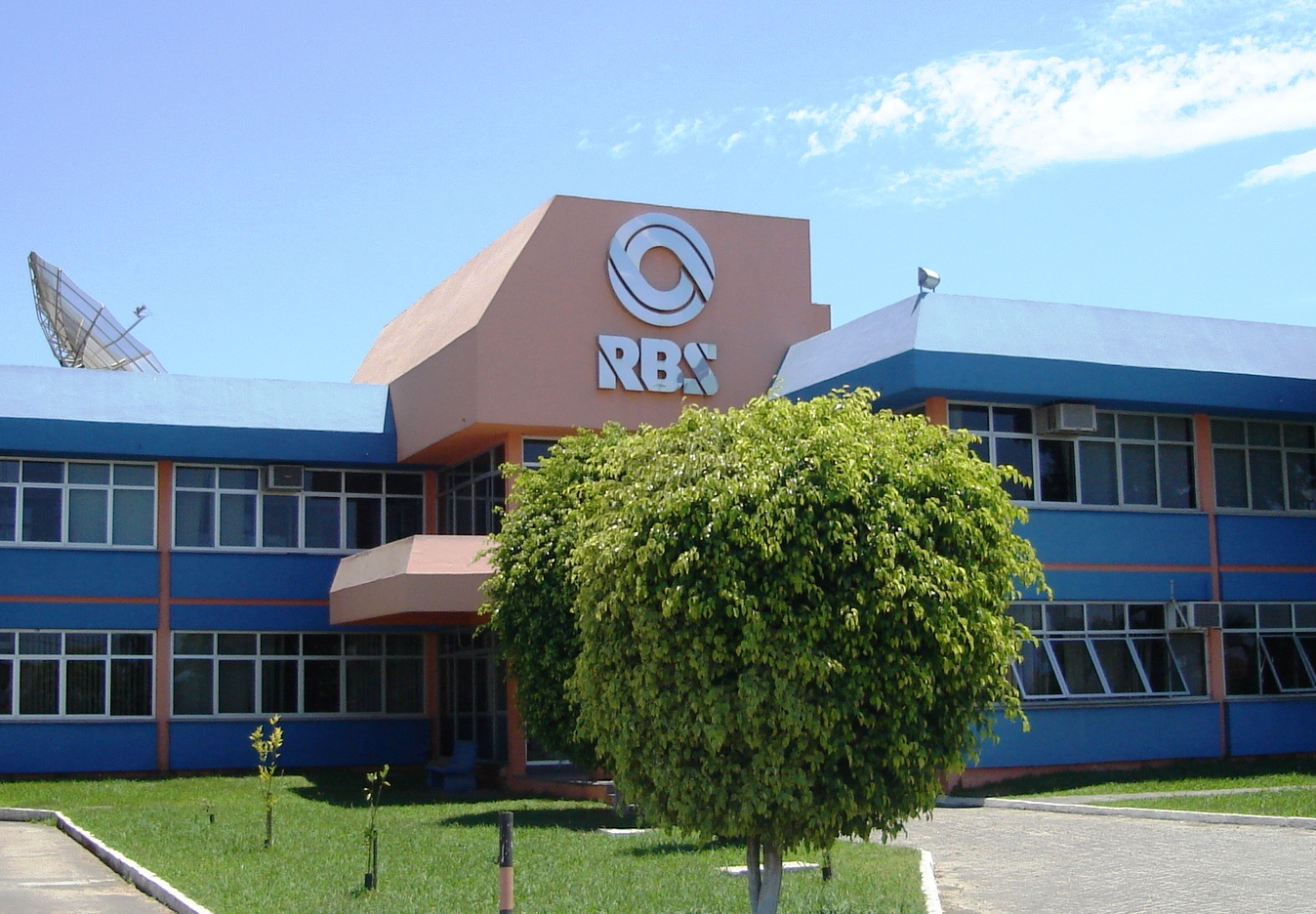
RBS TV Pelotas headquarters in 2008.

It was founded on July 5, 1972, by Maurício Sirotsky Sobrinho, being one of the first television stations of Rede Brasil Sul de Comunicações. Its headquarters were located on Rua 15 de Novembro, in the center of the city.

In 1978 the first repeaters of TV Tuiuti went on the air, in Canguçu and Jaguarão.

In 1979 TV Tuiuti, along with the other stations on Rede Brasil Sul, received the name RBS TV, being renamed RBS TV Pelotas. Later, RBS TV Pelotas moved to Hipólito José da Costa Street, in the Areal neighborhood.

In July 2009 an Ibope survey confirmed that RBS TV Pelotas is the Grupo RBS station with the highest audience in the interior of Rio Grande do Sul. According to the survey, the local Jornal do Almoço in Pelotas had an average of 75.9% of share between the months of April and June of the same year.

Since August 17, 2009, viewers of RBS TV Pelotas have been able to follow the work of the station's professionals through their blog, on the RBS TV portal.

== Digital television ==
| Channel | Res. | Programming |
|---|---|---|
| 4.1 | 1080i | Main RBS TV Pelotas programming / TV Globo |

RBS TV Pelotas started its transmission in digital signal on July 23, 2013, over UHF channel 34. The station turned off its analog signal, over VHF channel 4, on November 28, 2018, as part of the federally mandated transition from analog to digital television. The station's digital signal remained on its pre-transition UHF channel 34 until moving to channel 24 on July 1, 2024.

== Programming ==
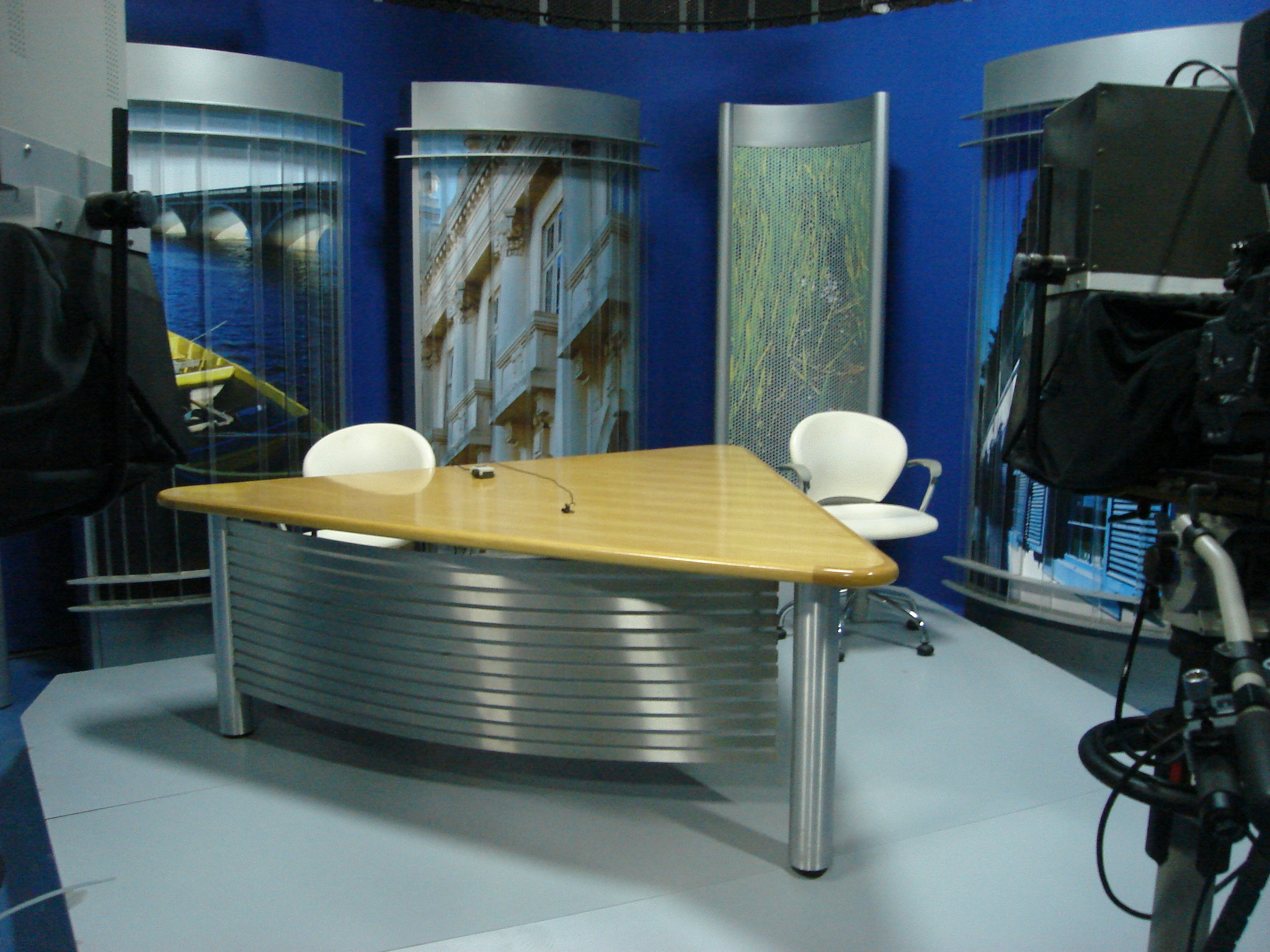
RBS TV Pelotas studio in 2008.

RBS TV Pelotas produces two blocks for Jornal do Almoço which is presented by Luiza La-Rocca, and which are also broadcast to RBS TV stations in Bagé and Rio Grande. The rest of the programming is occupied by Bom Dia Rio Grande, Jornal do Almoço, RBS Notícias and also by all national programming on TV Globo, of which RBS TV is an affiliate.
