= Geraldo Delamore =

Brazilian football manager (born 1963)

Personal information
- Full name: Geraldo Magela Delamore Moreira
- Date of birth: 5 April 1963 (age 63)
- Place of birth: Mariana, Minas Gerais, Brazil

Team information
- Current team: Cruzeiro

Managerial career
- Years: Team
- 1998–2000: Caxias (fitness coach)
- 2001–2003: Grêmio (fitness coach)
- 2003–2004: São Caetano (fitness coach)
- 2005: Atlético Mineiro (fitness coach)
- 2007: Al Ain (assistant)
- 2007: Al Ain
- 2008–2009: Brasil de Farroupilha
- 2009: Sapucaiense
- 2010: Guarani-RS (assistant)
- 2010: Al-Wahda (assistant)
- 2010–2013: Corinthians (assistant)
- 2014: Juventude
- 2016–: Cruzeiro (assistant)

Geraldo Magela Delamore Moreira (born 5 April 1963), known as Geraldo Delamore, is a Brazilian professional football manager.

== Career ==
Delamore was born in Mariana, Minas Gerais. From 1998 to 2005 he worked as a fitness coach in the Caxias, Grêmio, São Caetano and Atlético Mineiro. In 2007 first he helped train Emirati club Al Ain and then became a head coach of the club. Since 2008 until 2010 he led Brasil de Farroupilha and Sapucaiense. Until July 2013 he worked as assistant in the Corinthians. On 1 January 2014, he was appointed as a head coach of the Juventude and was changed on 19 February 2014.
