= Hélio dos Anjos =

Brazilian footballer and manager (born 1958)

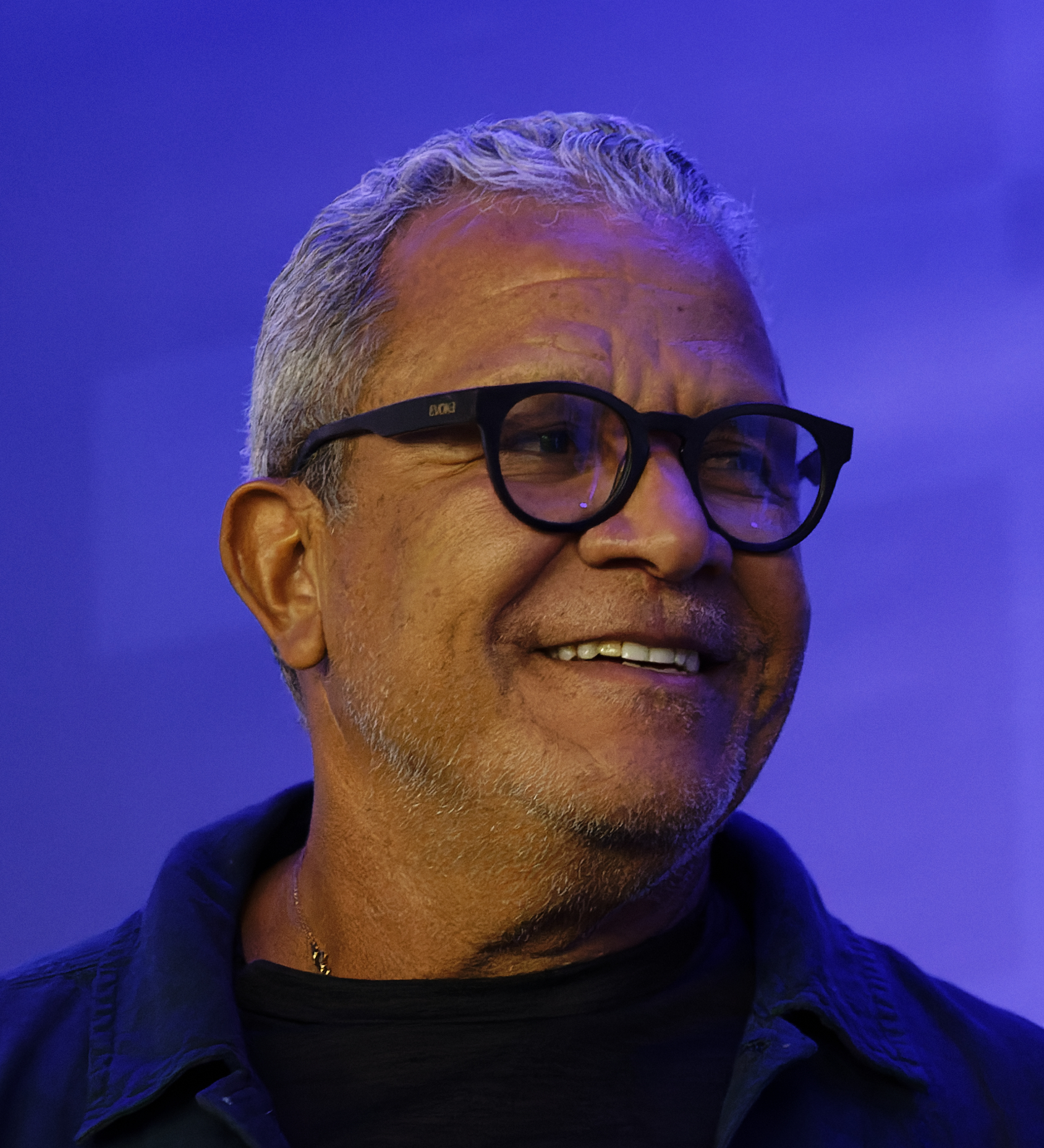
- Hélio dos Anjos in 2023

Personal information
- Full name: Hélio César dos Anjos Pinto
- Date of birth: 7 March 1958 (age 68)
- Place of birth: Janaúba, Brazil
- Position: Goalkeeper

Youth career
- ESAB
- Flamengo

Senior career*
Years	Team	Apps	(Gls)
1978–1980	Flamengo	1	(0)
1981–1982	Joinville	9	(0)

Managerial career
- Joinville (youth)
- 1986: Joinville (interim)
- 1988–1989: Joinville
- 1989–1990: Avaí
- 1990: Catanduvense
- 1990–1991: Juventude
- 1991–1992: Vitória
- 1992: Ceará
- 1992: Sãocarlense
- 1992: Joinville
- 1993: Novorizontino
- 1993: Náutico
- 1993–1994: Santo André
- 1994: Atlético Paranaense
- 1994: XV de Piracicaba
- 1995: Remo
- 1995: Goiás
- 1996: Vitória
- 1996–1997: Sport Recife
- 1997: Grêmio
- 1998: Vitória
- 1998: América Mineiro
- 1999–2000: Goiás
- 2001: Vasco da Gama
- 2001: Guarani
- 2001: Juventude
- 2001–2002: Goiás
- 2002: Gama
- 2002: Paysandu
- 2003–2004: Sport Recife
- 2004: Fortaleza
- 2004: Vitória
- 2005: Bahia
- 2005: Fortaleza
- 2005–2006: Juventude
- 2006: Fortaleza
- 2006: São Caetano
- 2006–2007: Náutico
- 2007–2008: Saudi Arabia
- 2008–2010: Goiás
- 2010: Al-Nasr
- 2011: Vila Nova
- 2011: Sport Recife
- 2011: Vila Nova
- 2011–2012: Atlético Goianiense
- 2012: Atlético Goianiense
- 2012: Figueirense
- 2013: Fortaleza
- 2014: Atlético Goianiense
- 2015: Caxias
- 2015: Goiás
- 2015: ABC
- 2016: Najran
- 2016: Al-Faisaly
- 2016–2017: Al-Qadisiyah
- 2017–2018: Goiás
- 2019–2020: Paysandu
- 2020–2021: Náutico
- 2021–2022: Náutico
- 2022–2023: Ponte Preta
- 2023–2024: Paysandu
- 2024: CRB
- 2025–2026: Náutico
Medal record
Men's football
Representing Saudi Arabia (as manager)
AFC Asian Cup
Runner-up	2007
- * Club domestic league appearances and goals

Hélio César dos Anjos Pinto (born 7 March 1958), known as Hélio dos Anjos, is a Brazilian professional football coach and former player who played as a goalkeeper.

After a short playing career, Hélio dos Anjos began his coaching career with Joinville, and went on to win 12 state league titles with different clubs. He often returned to clubs he previously coached, being charge of Goiás (six times), Náutico (four times), Vitória, Juventude, Fortaleza, Sport Recife, Atlético Goianiense and Paysandu (three times each).

== Playing career ==
Born in Januária, Minas Gerais, Hélio dos Anjos moved to Belo Horizonte as a teenager, where he featured in the youth sides of ESAB. From the side, he moved to Flamengo after being spotted by Sebastião Lazaroni, youth coordinator at the time.

Known as just Hélio during his playing days, his spell at Fla was mainly as a third-choice behind Raul Plassmann and Cantarele. He was swapped with Joinville in 1981, with Lico moving in the opposite direction.

In 1982, aged just 23, Hélio suffered an injury in training which broke two of his vertebras; he was paralyzed for 45 days, and later retired.

== Coaching career ==
After retiring, Hélio dos Anjos worked as a scout for Diede Lameiro at JEC, before taking over the club's youth sides. An interim coach of the main squad in 1986, he became a permanent head coach of the club in 1988, leaving in the following year.

In the 1990s, Hélio dos Anjos was in charge of Avaí, Catanduvense, Juventude, Vitória (three spells), Ceará (achieving promotion in the 1992 Série B with the club), Sãocarlense, Joinville, Novorizontino, Náutico, Santo André, Atlético Paranaense, XV de Piracicaba, Remo (winning the 1995 Campeonato Paraense in an unbeaten status), Goiás (two spells), Sport Recife (winning two consecutive Campeonato Pernambucano titles), Grêmio and América Mineiro. He achieved two consecutive promotions from the Campeonato Paulista Série A2 in 1993 and 1994, with Santo André and XV, respectively, and won the 1999 Série B and two Campeonato Goiano trophies with Goiás.

Ahead of the 2001 season, Hélio dos Anjos became Eurico Miranda's first head coach at Vasco da Gama, but only lasted 16 matches. He later took over Guarani on 7 June 2001.

Sacked by Bugre on 13 August 2001, he subsequently returned to Juventude and Goiás, and was in charge of Gama in the first rounds of the 2002 Série A, leaving in September to take over Paysandu. He returned to Sport for a second spell for the 2003 campaign, winning the year's Pernambucano before leaving in the following year; for the remainder of the 2004 season, he was in charge of Fortaleza and Vitória.

Hélio dos Anjos agreed to return to Santo André on 22 November 2004, but left the club on 8 December, and was named Bahia head coach fourteen days later. Sacked on 18 April 2005, he returned to Fortaleza on 29 June, being dismissed in October and taking over Juventude afterwards.

On 7 June 2006, Hélio dos Anjos left Ju to return to Fortaleza, but resigned on 5 September to take over São Caetano. On 15 October, after seven losses in as many matches, he resigned from the latter.

In October 2006, Hélio dos Anjos returned to Náutico, and renewed his contract on 22 November, after achieving promotion to the Série A. On 16 March 2007, he moved abroad and replaced compatriot Marcos Paquetá as manager of the Saudi Arabia national team.

Hélio dos Anjos led Saudi Arabia to the 2007 AFC Asian Cup final, losing to Iraq. He was dismissed from the national team on 9 June 2008, and returned to Goiás seven days later. He was relieved from his duties at the latter on 25 January 2010, after a poor start of the season.

On 28 December 2010, after a short period in charge of Emirati side Al-Nasr, Hélio dos Anjos was announced as Vila Nova head coach for the ensuing campaign. He left on 8 February to return to Sport, but resigned on 20 June, returning to Vila on 26 June but again resigning on 10 August.

Hélio dos Anjos was appointed head coach of Atlético Goianiense on 12 August 2011, but left the club the following 3 March, after a fitness coach also resigned. He returned to the club on 30 May 2012, however, but resigned again on 9 July.

On 23 July 2012, Hélio dos Anjos replaced Argel Fuchs at the helm of Figueirense in the top tier, but was sacked on 24 August after the club's elimination in the 2012 Copa Sudamericana. On 6 March 2013, he returned to Fortaleza for a third spell, but was dismissed on 4 August.

Hélio dos Anjos returned to Atlético Goianiense for a third spell on 16 June 2014, but only lasted two months at the club. On 13 March 2015, after nearly six months unemployed, he took over Caxias.

On 5 April 2015, Hélio dos Anjos returned to Goiás after five years, but was sacked on 22 June, after five winless matches. On 18 August, he took over ABC in the second division, but left on a mutual agreement on 9 October.

On 31 December 2015, Hélio dos Anjos returned to Saudi Arabia to take over Najran. He was also in charge of Al-Faisaly and Al-Qadisiyah in the same country in 2016, before returning to Goiás on 16 September 2017.

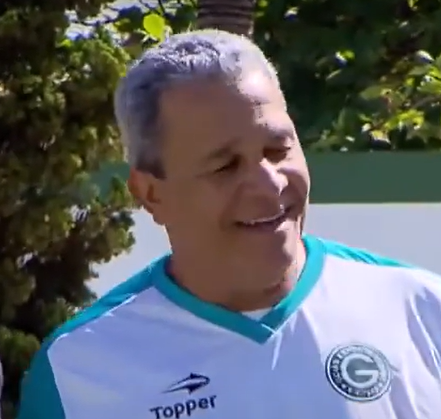
Hélio dos Anjos as coach of Goiás in 2017

Sacked by Goiás on 6 May 2018, Hélio dos Anjos spent more than a year unemployed before returning to Paysandu on 31 May 2019. He left the club on 15 September 2020, after having altercations with the club's board.

On 18 November 2020, Hélio dos Anjos returned to Náutico, and led the club to their best-ever start in the 2021 Série B, with the club being in the leadership for 14 rounds. On 18 August 2021, he resigned, but returned to the club on 23 September.

Sacked by Timbu on 11 February 2022, Hélio dos Anjos became head coach of fellow second division side Ponte Preta twelve days later. He led the club to the 2023 Paulista Série A2 title, but left on a mutual agreement on 18 April of that year, ten days after winning the competition.

Hélio dos Anjos returned to Paysandu on 28 June 2023, and led the club to a promotion in the year's Série C. On 6 September 2024, he was dismissed, and took over fellow second division side CRB 14 days later.

On 29 November 2024, after rejecting a wage cut offered by the club, Hélio dos Anjos was dismissed by CRB. On 16 April of the following year, he returned to Náutico for his fifth spell as head coach.

On 10 November 2025, after achieving promotion with Timbu to the second division, Hélio dos Anjos renewed his contract with the club until 2027, now with being head coach of the side in a shared command with his son Guilherme. Both were sacked on 23 September 2026, despite winning three of the last six matches.

== Personal life ==
Hélio dos Anjos' son Guilherme also works with football; both have been working together since 2012, with Guilherme as his assistant. He is also a businessman, member of the Construction G4.

In June 2016, Hélio dos Anjos was ordered by the Justice to pay an indemnization to player Edmílson Paulista after calling him a "homosexual" during a press conference in 1992, when both were at Joinville. In October 2023, he was suspended for nine matches after uttering homophobic curses to a referee.

== Coaching statistics ==
As of 23 August 2026

Coaching record by team and tenure
Team	Nat	From	To	Record								Ref
Team	Nat	From	To	G	W	D	L	GF	GA	GD	Win %	Ref
Joinville	(Brazil)	12 January 1988	6 August 1989	108	44	37	27	133	100	+33	40.74	
Avai	(Brazil)	28 August 1989	30 April 1990	22	3	9	10	11	22	−11	13.64	
Catanduvense	(Brazil)	4 May 1990	23 June 1990	12	1	2	9	3	16	−13	8.33	
Juventude	(Brazil)	15 July 1990	10 February 1991	31	10	13	8	25	27	−2	32.26	
Vitória	(Brazil)	7 March 1991	30 July 1991	24	6	9	9	24	27	−3	25.00	
Ceará	(Brazil)	5 August 1991	25 February 1992	27	9	12	6	31	24	+7	33.33	
Sãocarlense	(Brazil)	20 June 1992	27 July 1992	23	10	6	7	36	30	+6	43.48	
Joinville	(Brazil)	22 August 1992	10 December 1992	24	9	12	3	29	19	+10	37.50	
Novorizontino	(Brazil)	14 January 1993	29 May 1993	23	10	6	7	36	30	+6	43.48	
Náutico	(Brazil)	20 June 1993	29 October 1993	23	10	6	7	36	30	+6	43.48	
Santo André	(Brazil)	12 November 1993	4 April 1994	19	5	5	9	17	25	−8	26.32	
Athletico Paranaense	(Brazil)	27 April 1994	12 June 1994	9	2	5	2	7	9	−2	22.22	
XV de Piracicaba	(Brazil)	20 June 1994	30 November 1994	15	6	6	3	18	8	+10	40.00	
Remo	(Brazil)	10 February 1995	2 July 1995	18	13	4	1	43	8	+35	72.22	
Goiás	(Brazil)	3 July 1995	4 December 1995	25	11	6	8	37	26	+11	44.00	
Vitória	(Brazil)	4 January 1996	10 July 1996	33	17	10	6	67	32	+35	51.52	
Sport Recife	(Brazil)	2 August 1996	28 May 1997	58	31	16	11	109	61	+48	53.45	
Grêmio	(Brazil)	29 May 1997	12 November 1997	39	12	16	11	54	65	−11	30.77	
Vitória	(Brazil)	1 January 1998	10 June 1998	39	24	6	9	85	39	+46	61.54	
América Mineiro	(Brazil)	23 July 1998	26 August 1998	8	2	1	5	10	16	−6	25.00	
Goiás	(Brazil)	10 February 1999	20 December 2000	143	88	29	26	310	149	+161	61.54	
Vasco da Gama	(Brazil)	25 January 2001	14 February 2001	16	13	1	2	29	12	+17	81.25	
Guarani	(Brazil)	7 June 2001	13 August 2001	5	0	1	4	4	17	−13	0.00	
Juventude	(Brazil)	12 September 2001	22 October 2001	9	1	5	3	8	15	−7	11.11	
Goiás	(Brazil)	9 November 2001	19 July 2002	17	9	2	6	37	28	+9	52.94	
Gama	(Brazil)	1 August 2002	8 September 2002	9	3	2	4	7	8	−1	33.33	
Paysandu	(Brazil)	9 September 2002	3 January 2003	19	8	2	9	29	31	−2	42.11	
Sport Recife	(Brazil)	6 January 2003	25 March 2004	89	47	25	17	172	96	+76	52.81	
Fortaleza	(Brazil)	23 April 2004	18 August 2004	19	9	7	3	37	23	+14	47.37	
Vitória	(Brazil)	20 August 2004	30 September 2004	8	1	1	6	10	18	−8	12.50	
Bahia	(Brazil)	14 February 2005	3 March 2005	4	2	0	2	14	9	+5	50.00	
Fortaleza	(Brazil)	6 May 2005	16 October 2005	30	12	4	14	44	49	−5	40.00	
Juventude	(Brazil)	18 October 2005	6 June 2006	37	16	10	11	58	52	+6	43.24	
Fortaleza	(Brazil)	7 June 2006	3 September 2006	12	2	6	4	16	19	−3	16.67	
São Caetano	(Brazil)	4 September 2006	14 October 2006	7	0	0	7	3	13	−10	0.00	
Náutico	(Brazil)	15 October 2006	8 March 2007	21	12	3	6	44	24	+20	57.14	
Saudi Arabia	(Saudi Arabia)	16 March 2007	10 June 2008	24	15	3	6	41	21	+20	62.50	
Goiás	(Brazil)	15 June 2008	25 January 2010	103	50	24	29	185	129	+56	48.54	
Al-Nasr	(United Arab Emirates)	22 February 2010	10 October 2010	12	4	2	6	17	25	−8	33.33	
Vila Nova	(Brazil)	24 December 2010	7 February 2011	7	4	2	1	11	4	+7	57.14	
Sport Recife	(Brazil)	8 February 2011	20 June 2011	25	11	7	7	35	25	+10	44.00	
Vila Nova	(Brazil)	28 June 2011	10 August 2011	9	3	3	3	8	7	+1	33.33	
Atlético Goianiense	(Brazil)	17 August 2011	16 March 2012	36	18	10	8	66	40	+26	50.00	
Atlético Goianiense	(Brazil)	30 May 2012	9 July 2012	6	0	0	6	3	14	−11	0.00	
Figueirense	(Brazil)	23 July 2012	24 August 2012	9	1	2	6	4	15	−11	11.11	
Fortaleza	(Brazil)	6 March 2013	4 August 2013	30	13	7	10	43	32	+11	43.33	
Atlético Goianiense	(Brazil)	16 June 2014	3 September 2014	10	5	0	5	15	16	−1	50.00	
Caxias	(Brazil)	17 March 2015	06 April 2015	5	1	2	2	3	4	−1	20.00	
Goiás	(Brazil)	6 April 2015	22 June 2015	17	7	5	5	19	12	+7	41.18	
ABC	(Brazil)	18 August 2015	9 October 2015	11	0	7	4	10	18	−8	0.00	
Najran	(Saudi Arabia)	28 December 2015	30 June 2016	13	3	4	6	25	30	−5	23.08	
Al-Faisaly	(Saudi Arabia)	1 July 2016	6 November 2016	9	2	2	5	8	13	−5	22.22	
Al-Qadsiah	(Saudi Arabia)	8 November 2016	22 April 2017	17	5	5	7	30	31	−1	29.41	
Goiás	(Brazil)	16 September 2017	22 April 2018	40	18	12	10	48	35	+13	45.00	
Paysandu	(Brazil)	31 May 2019	15 September 2020	45	20	19	6	68	34	+34	44.44	
Náutico	(Brazil)	20 November 2020	18 August 2021	48	22	15	11	67	47	+20	45.83	
Náutico	(Brazil)	24 September 2021	10 February 2022	19	8	4	7	31	28	+3	42.11	
Ponte Preta	(Brazil)	25 February 2022	18 April 2023	66	27	21	18	80	66	+14	40.91	
Paysandu	(Brazil)	29 June 2023	6 September 2024	63	27	22	14	88	55	+33	42.86	
CRB	(Brazil)	23 September 2024	30 November 2024	11	5	2	4	14	12	+2	45.45	
Náutico	(Brazil)	16 April 2025	23 September 2026	66	29	17	20	86	60	+26	43.94	
Total				1,712	750	477	485	2,591	1,918	+673	43.81	—

== Honours ==
=== Player ===
Flamengo

- Campeonato Brasileiro Série A: 1980
- Campeonato Carioca: 1978, 1979

=== Coach ===
Vitória

- Campeonato Baiano: 1992

Remo

- Campeonato Paraense: 1995

Sport Recife

- Campeonato Pernambucano: 1996, 1997, 2003

Goiás

- Campeonato Brasileiro Série B: 1999
- Campeonato Goiano: 1999, 2000, 2009, 2015, 2018
- Copa Centro-Oeste: 2000

Paysandu

- Campeonato Paraense: 2020, 2024
- Copa Verde: 2024

Náutico

- Campeonato Pernambucano: 2021

Ponte Preta

- Campeonato Paulista Série A2: 2023

== See also ==
- List of football managers with the most matches
