= Alemão (footballer, born 1981) =

Brazilian footballer

Personal information
- Full name: Clodoveu Almeida Mariano Júnior
- Date of birth: 14 August 1981 (age 45)
- Place of birth: São Paulo, Brazil
- Position: Left back

Youth career
- –2000: São Paulo

Senior career*
Years	Team	Apps	(Gls)
2000–2001	São Paulo	7	(1)
2001	Coritiba		
2002	Portuguesa		
2003	América-SP		
2003	CRB		
2003	Colón		
2004	CRAC		
2005	Santa Cruz		
2006	Ipatinga		
2007	São Bento		
2007	Londrina		
2008	Itaúna		
2008	Formiga		
2009	Brasil de Pelotas		
2010	Sorriso		
2010	Camboriú		
2011	Sorriso		
2011	Rio Verde-GO		
2011	Valerio		
2011	Macará		
2012	Social		
2012	Juventus Santa Rosa		
- * Club domestic league appearances and goals as of 24 September 2023

Clodoveu Almeida Mariano Júnior (born 14 August 1981), mostly known as Alemão, is a Brazilian former professional footballer who played as a left back.

== Career ==
Alemão started in the youth categories of São Paulo, where he was champion of the Copa São Paulo in 2000. He was also part of the champion squad of the Torneio Rio-São Paulo on the following year. Scored a single goal for São Paulo FC, in their debut game against Colo-Colo in the 2000 Copa Mercosur.

He was on the 2009 Brasil de Pelotas bus disaster. Retired due to a serious thigh adductor injury.

== Personal life ==
Alemão currently lives in Austin, Texas in the United States, where he runs an association football school.

== Honours ==
São Paulo

- Copa São Paulo de Futebol Jr.: 2000
- Torneio Rio-São Paulo: 2001

CRAC

- Campeonato Goiano: 2004

Rio Verde

- Campeonato Goiano Second Division: 2011
