= RBS TV Bagé =

RBS TV Bagé (ZYB 610)
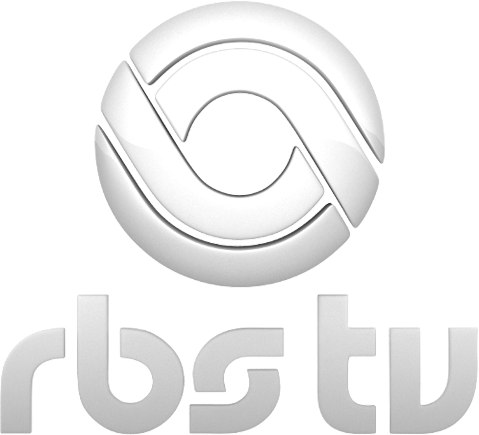

Bagé, Rio Grande do Sul; Brazil
- Channels: Digital: 34 (UHF); Virtual: 6

Programming
- Affiliations: TV Globo

Ownership
- Owner: Grupo RBS; (RBS TV Bagé Ltda.)

History
- First air date: January 19, 1977
- Former names: TV Bagé (1977-1983)
- Former channel number(s): Analog: 6 (VHF, 1977-2021)

Technical information
- Licensing authority: ANATEL
- Transmitter coordinates: 31°21′06.6″S 52°7′13.2″W

Links
- Public license information: Profile
- Website: redeglobo.globo.com/rs/rbstvrs

RBS TV Bagé (channel 6) is a television station in Bagé, Rio Grande do Sul, Brazil, affiliated with TV Globo, member of RBS TV and owned by Grupo RBS. RBS TV Bagé's studios and transmitter are located on Rua do Acampamento, in Passo do Príncipe district.

== History ==
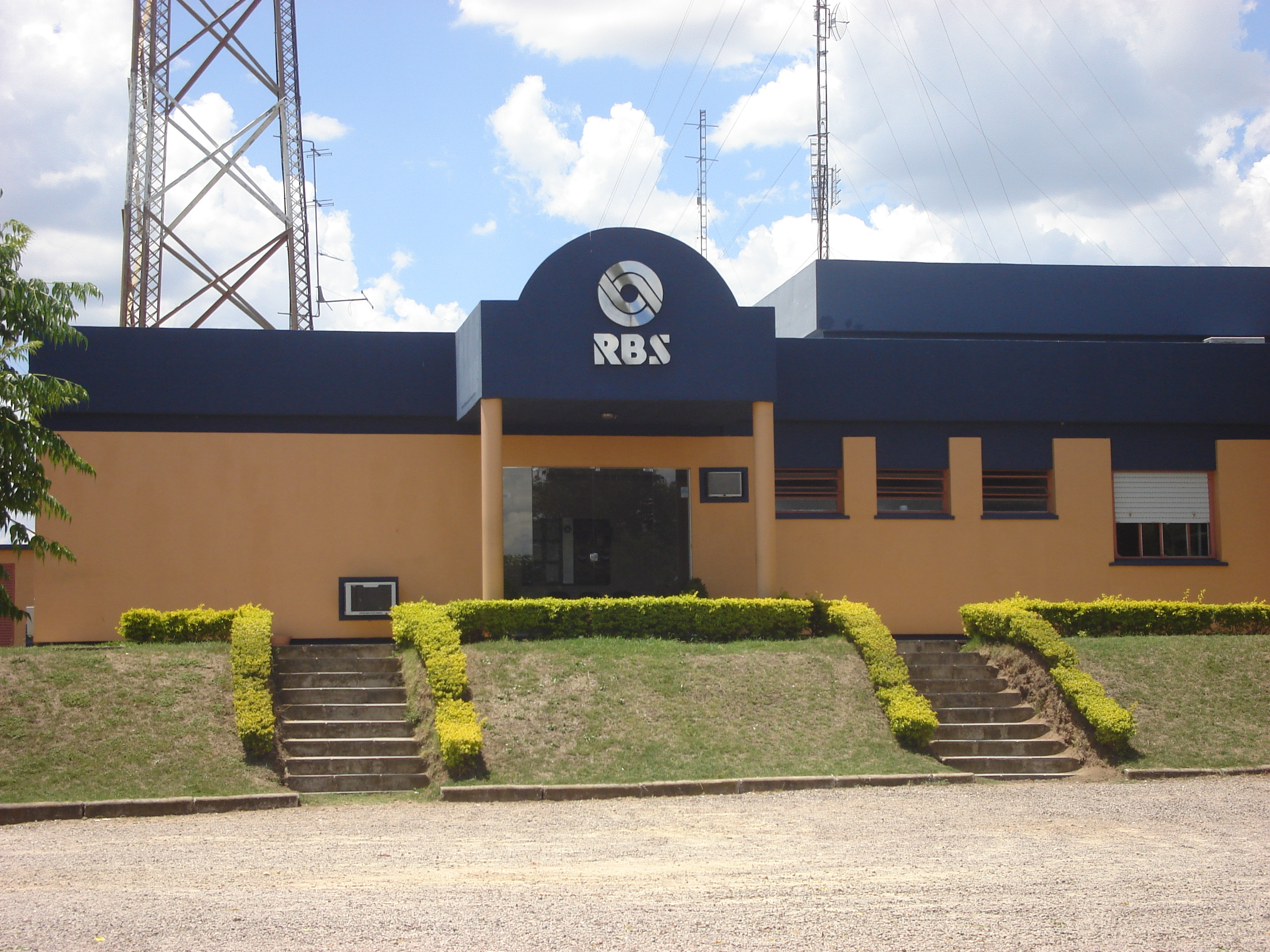
Headquarters of the TV station, in 2008.

The station's history begins on November 21, 1973, when President Emílio Garrastazu Médici granted the concession of channel 6 VHF to Rede Brasil Sul de Comunicações. TV Bagé was inaugurated on January 19, 1977, with the presence of the then Minister of Communications Euclides Quandt de Oliveira.

On October 1, 1983, TV Bagé, along with other RBS TV stations in Rio Grande do Sul and Santa Catarina, was renamed RBS TV Bagé. In 1985, its first relay went on the air, channel 12 of Dom Pedrito. Later, the repeaters of Pinheiro Machado and Santana do Livramento entered the air, forming the region covered by RBS TV Bagé.

In 2005, due to Rede Globo's 40th anniversary, RBS TV Bagé and all other RBS TV stations received a standardized scenario in accordance with the network's local telejournalism to be used in the local blocks of Jornal do Almoço and RBS News. The scenario of television news in Bagé has photos of the region reproduced on large panels in the studio.

In July 2009, an Ibope survey confirmed the audience leadership of RBS TV Bagé. According to the survey, the local Jornal do Almoço in Bagé had an average share of 71.5% between April and June of the same year.

== Digital television ==
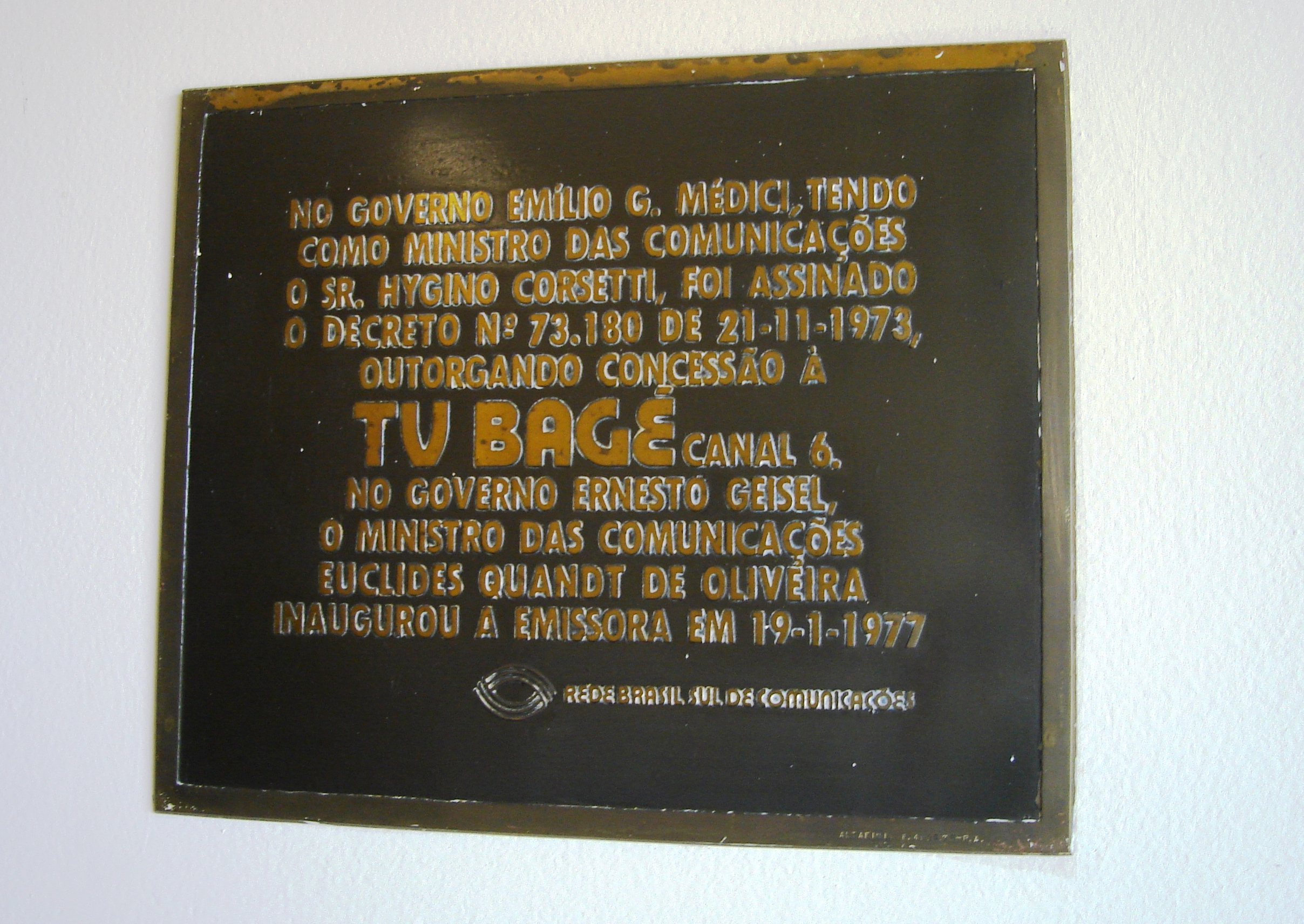
Opening plaque of TV Bagé

Channel	Video	Aspect	Programming
6.1	34 UHF	1080i	Main RBS TV Bagé programming / TV Globo

On April 30, 2012, MiniCom awarded channel 34 UHF digital to the broadcaster. On February 19, 2014, tests for implementation began, and on April 24, the station's digital signal was officially inaugurated. Until 2019, the year it stopped producing local programs, the station did not show its programming in high definition, with the exception of what was broadcast by RBS TV Porto Alegre and Globo. The station's channel 6 VHF analog signal was shut off on July 30, 2021.

== Programming ==
The broadcaster produced, until July 31, 2019, local blocks of Jornal do Almoço with 20 minutes of duration, at the time presented by Roberta Mércio. On August 19, it started to relay the regional block of the newscast generated by RBS TV Pelotas. The rest of the programming is made up of programs generated by RBS TV Porto Alegre and programs from Rede Globo.
