= 1999 Campeonato Brasileiro Série B =

Campeonato Brasileiro Série B
- Season: 1999
- Champions: Goiás
- Promoted: Goiás; Santa Cruz
- Relegated: União São João; Criciúma; Paysandu; América-RN; Tuna Luso; Desportiva
- Top goalscorer: Ueslei (Bahia) - 25
- Biggest home win: Remo 7-1 Avaí (September 9, 1999)
- Biggest away win: Desportiva 0-5 Criciúma (August 29, 1999); Bragantino 0-5 Sampaio Corrêa (October 24, 1999)
- Highest scoring: Remo 7-1 Avaí (September 9, 1999); Goiás 4-4 Bahia (October 11, 1999)

The football (soccer) Campeonato Brasileiro Série B 1999, the second level of Brazilian National League, was played from August 1 to December 12, 1999. The competition had 22 clubs and two of them were promoted to Série A and six were relegated to Série C. The competition was won by Goiás.

Goiás finished the final phase group with the most points, and was declared 1999 Brazilian Série B champions, claiming the promotion to the 2000 Série A along with Santa Cruz, the runners-up. The six worst ranked teams in the first round (União São João, Criciúma, Paysandu, América-RN, Tuna Luso and Desportiva) would be relegated to play Série C in 2000. However, with the debacle that resulted in the creation of the Copa João Havelange in 2000, Bahia (third-placed) and América-MG (sixth-placed) were promoted to Série A, and from the originally-relegated teams, only Tuna Luso actually played the Green and White Group, the equivalent to the Série C, with the other five relegated teams playing the Group Yellow. For 2001, all of the participating teams in 1999's Série B, with the exception of Goiás, São Caetano, América-MG, Bahia and Santa Cruz were included in that year's Série B.

== Teams ==
Team	City	Stadium	1998 Season
ABC	Natal	Machadão	11th in Série B
América-MG	Belo Horizonte	Independência	21st in Série A
América de Natal	Natal	Machadão	24th in Série A
Avaí	Florianópolis	Ressacada	1st in Série C
Bahia	Salvador	Fonte Nova	18th in Série B
Bragantino	Bragança Paulista	Nabi Abi Chedid	23rd in Série A
Ceará	Fortaleza	Castelão	14th in Série B
CRB	Maceió	Pajuçara	12th in Série B
Criciúma	Criciúma	Heriberto Hülse	6th in Série B
Desportiva	Cariacica	Engenheiro Araripe	3rd in Série B
Goiás	Goiânia	Serra Dourada	22nd in Série A
Joinville	Joinville	Ernestão	7th in Série B
Londrina	Londrina	Café	4th in Série B
Paysandu	Belém	Curuzú	8th in Série B
Remo	Belém	Mangueirão	9th in Série B
São Caetano	São Caetano do Sul	Anacleto Campanella	2nd in Série C
Santa Cruz	Recife	Arruda	13th in Série B
Sampaio Corrêa	São Luís	Castelão	17th in Série B
Tuna Luso	Recife	Ilha do Retiro	15th in Série B
União São João	Araras	Herminião	16th in Série B
Vila Nova	Goiânia	Serra Dourada	10th in Série B
XV de Piracicaba	Piracicaba	Barão da Serra Negra	5th in Série B

== First stage ==
Pos	Team	Pld	W	D	L	GF	GA	GD	Pts	Qualification or relegation
1	São Caetano	21	13	6	2	33	15	+18	45	Qualified to Quarterfinals
2	Bahia	21	9	10	2	38	23	+15	37	Qualified to Quarterfinals
3	Goiás	21	10	6	5	35	22	+13	36	Qualified to Quarterfinals
4	Vila Nova	21	9	7	5	30	19	+11	34	Qualified to Quarterfinals
5	América-MG	21	9	6	6	33	21	+12	33	Qualified to Quarterfinals
6	Ceará	21	9	5	7	25	20	+5	32	Qualified to Quarterfinals
7	Avaí	21	9	5	7	26	29	−3	32	Qualified to Quarterfinals
8	Santa Cruz	21	9	3	9	22	29	−7	30	Qualified to Quarterfinals
9	XV de Piracicaba	21	8	6	7	23	22	+1	30	
10	Londrina	21	8	6	7	23	25	−2	30	
11	CRB	21	8	5	8	20	24	−4	29	
12	Bragantino	21	8	5	8	23	31	−8	29	
13	Remo	21	7	6	8	28	29	−1	27	
14	ABC	21	6	9	6	28	29	−1	27	
15	Joinville	21	8	2	11	22	25	−3	26	
16	Sampaio Corrêa	21	7	5	9	40	37	+3	26	
17	União São João	21	6	8	7	28	25	+3	26	Relegated
18	Criciúma	21	6	6	9	27	36	−9	24	Relegated
19	Paysandu	21	5	9	7	24	28	−4	24	Relegated
20	América-RN	21	6	4	11	25	31	−6	22	Relegated
21	Tuna Luso	21	6	4	11	24	36	−12	22	Relegated
22	Desportiva	21	2	3	16	12	33	−21	9	Relegated

== Quarterfinals ==
Teams			Scores		Tie-breaker
Team 1	Points	Team 2	1st leg	2nd leg	3rd leg
Bahia	6:0	(Santa Catarina (state)) Avaí	2:1	3:1	—
Goiás	3:3	Ceará	3:0	3:4	2:0
Santa Cruz (Pernambuco)	3:3	(São Paulo (state)) São Caetano	1:0	3:4	1:0
América-MG (Minas Gerais)	2:2	(Goiás) Vila Nova	2:2	0:0	1:3

== Final stage ==
Pos	Team	Pld	W	D	L	GF	GA	GD	Pts	Promotion	GOI	SCR	BAH	VIL
1	Goiás	6	3	2	1	5	3	+2	11	Promoted to Série A 2000		0–0	0–0	1–0
2	Santa Cruz	6	3	1	2	6	5	+1	10	Promoted to Série A 2000	2–1		2–1	2–1
3	Bahia	6	2	1	3	9	9	0	7		1–2	1–0		4–2
4	Vila Nova	6	2	0	4	7	10	−3	6		0–1	1–0	3–2	

== Final standings ==
Pos	Team	Pld	W	D	L	GF	GA	GD	Pts	Promotion or relegation
1	Goiás	30	15	8	7	48	29	+19	53	Promoted to 2000 Série A
2	Santa Cruz	30	14	4	12	33	38	−5	46	Promoted to 2000 Série A
3	Bahia	29	13	11	5	52	34	+18	50	Reached Final phase group
4	Vila Nova	30	12	9	9	42	32	+10	45	Reached Final phase group
5	São Caetano	24	14	6	4	37	20	+17	48	Quarterfinalists
6	América-MG	24	9	8	7	36	26	+10	35	Quarterfinalists
7	Ceará	24	10	5	9	29	28	+1	35	Quarterfinalists
8	Avaí	23	9	5	9	28	34	−6	32	Quarterfinalists
9	XV de Piracicaba	21	8	6	7	23	22	+1	30	
10	Londrina	21	8	6	7	23	25	−2	30	
11	CRB	21	8	5	8	20	24	−4	29	
12	Bragantino	21	8	5	8	23	31	−8	29	
13	Remo	21	7	6	8	28	29	−1	27	
14	ABC	21	6	9	6	28	29	−1	27	
15	Joinville	21	8	2	11	22	25	−3	26	
16	Sampaio Corrêa	21	7	5	9	40	37	+3	26	
17	União São João	21	6	8	7	28	25	+3	26	Relegated
18	Criciúma	21	6	6	9	27	36	−9	24	Relegated
19	Paysandu	21	5	9	7	24	28	−4	24	Relegated
20	América-RN	21	6	4	11	25	31	−6	22	Relegated
21	Tuna Luso	21	6	4	11	24	36	−12	22	Relegated
22	Desportiva	21	2	3	16	12	33	−21	9	Relegated

== Sources ==
- "Brazil Second Level 1999". rsssf.com.
