= 2008 Campeonato Gaúcho =

Campeonato Gaúcho
- Season: 2008
- Champions: Internacional (38th title)
- Relegated: Guarany; 15 de Novembro
- Copa do Brasil: Internacional; Juventude; Grêmio; Caxias (Copa FGF 2007 winners)
- Série C: Internacional (SM); Caxias; Brasil (Copa FGF 2007 runners-up)
- Goals scored: 376
- Average goals/game: 2.98
- Top goalscorer: Alex (Internacional) and Mendes (Juventude) (13)
- Biggest home win: Internacional 8-1 Juventude (Final, 2008 May 04)
- Biggest away win: Guarany 0–6 Internacional (First Stage, 2008 March 02)
- Highest scoring: Internacional 8-1 Juventude (Final, 2008 May 04)
- Highest attendance: 46.472 - Internacional 2-0 Brasil (First Stage, 2008 March 08)

The 88th season of the Campeonato Gaúcho kicked off on January 19, 2008. The competition began with 16 clubs divided into two groups. Even before the end of first stage, Guarany and 15 de Novembro were already relegated. Holders Grêmio had an early exit after being defeated by Juventude at homeground. Once again, the two biggest clubs of Rio Grande do Sul would not meet at the final. Internacional set a new record: the highest score in a final match, after beating Juventude 8–1 at Beira-Rio Stadium. That was the 38th title in the history of the club.

The tournament qualified both finalists to the Copa do Brasil (Brazil Cup) - Grêmio is also qualified based on CBF ranking criteria. As Internacional will play Série A and Juventude, Série B this season, the semifinal losers, Internacional of Santa Maria and Caxias qualified for the Série C (3rd level of National championship).

== Teams ==
Club	City	Position in 2007	Number of titles (until 2007)
Internacional	Porto Alegre	7th	37
Grêmio	Porto Alegre	Champions	35
São José	Porto Alegre	12th	-
Caxias	Caxias do Sul	6th	1
Juventude	Caxias do Sul	Runners-up	1
Brasil	Pelotas	10th	1
Esportivo	Bento Gonçalves	5th	-
Santa Cruz	Santa Cruz do Sul	13th	-
Veranópolis	Veranópolis	4th	-
São Luiz	Ijuí	14th	-
Novo Hamburgo	Novo Hamburgo	9th	-
15 de Novembro	Campo Bom	11th	-
Guarany	Bagé	8th	2
Ulbra	Canoas	3rd	-
Sapucaiense	Sapucaia do Sul	Champions (2nd Division)	-
Internacional (SM)	Santa Maria	Runners-up (2nd Division)	-

== System ==
- Group Stage: The 16 teams were divided in 2 groups of 8 teams each. They played against each other inside their groups in home-and-away system. After 14 rounds, the top 4 teams qualified to the Quarterfinals and the bottom team from each group were relegated to play 2nd Division in 2009.
- Quarterfinals: Considering Group Stage positions, the 8 qualified teams were placed in 4 groups of 2 teams each which played in home-and-away system.
- Semifinals: Quarterfinals winners were divided in 2 groups of 2 teams each and they played in home-and-away system. Teams with best overall record played second leg at home
- Finals: Semifinals winners played in home-and-away to define Champions. Team with best overall record played second leg at home.

== Group stage ==
=== Group 1 ===
Pos	Team	Pld	W	D	L	GF	GA	GD	Pts	Qualification or relegation
1	Grêmio	14	11	3	0	28	8	+20	36	Advance to Quarterfinals
2	Caxias	14	6	6	2	18	9	+9	24	Advance to Quarterfinals
3	Sapucaiense	14	6	4	4	23	20	+3	22	Advance to Quarterfinals
4	Ulbra	14	6	3	5	20	24	−4	21	Advance to Quarterfinals
5	Esportivo	14	6	2	6	17	18	−1	20	
6	Novo Hamburgo	14	5	2	7	23	24	−1	17	
7	Santa Cruz	14	4	1	9	16	23	−7	13	
8	15 de Novembro	14	1	1	12	11	30	−19	4	Second Division 2009

==== Fixtures ====
Date	Match			Venue
2008 Jan 19	Grêmio	3-0	15 de Novembro	Porto Alegre
2008 Jan 19	Caxias	2-0	Santa Cruz	Caxias do Sul
2008 Jan 20	Novo Hamburgo	1-2	Esportivo	Novo Hamburgo
2008 Jan 20	Ulbra	3-2	Sapucaiense	Canoas
2008 Jan 22	15 de Novembro	0-1	Caxias	Campo Bom
2008 Jan 23	Sapucaiense	1-1	Grêmio	São Leopoldo
2008 Jan 23	Santa Cruz	2-0	Novo Hamburgo	Santa Cruz do Sul
2008 Jan 23	Esportivo	2-1	Ulbra	Bento Gonçalves
2008 Jan 26	Grêmio	1-0	Santa Cruz	Porto Alegre
2008 Jan 26	Novo Hamburgo	0-0	Caxias	Novo Hamburgo
2008 Jan 26	Ulbra	3-2	15 de Novembro	Canoas
2008 Jan 27	Sapucaiense	0-0	Esportivo	São Leopoldo
2008 Jan 30	15 de Novembro	1-3	Esportivo	Campo Bom
2008 Feb 1	Santa Cruz	2-2	Ulbra	Santa Cruz do Sul
2008 Feb 2	Novo Hamburgo	1-3	Sapucaiense	Novo Hamburgo
2008 Feb 2	Caxias	2-2	Grêmio	Caxias do Sul
2008 Feb 6	Caxias	0-0	Ulbra	Caxias do Sul
2008 Feb 9	Grêmio	2-0	Novo Hamburgo	Porto Alegre
2008 Feb 10	Esportivo	1-0	Santa Cruz	Bento Gonçalves
2008 Feb 10	Sapucaiense	1-0	15 de Novembro	São Leopoldo
2008 Feb 13	15 de Novembro	0-3	Novo Hamburgo	Campo Bom
2008 Jan 17	Ulbra	0-1	Grêmio	Canoas
2008 Feb 17	Esportivo	0-1	Caxias	Bento Gonçalves
2008 Feb 17	Sapucaiense	0-1	Santa Cruz	São Leopoldo
2008 Feb 20	Caxias	2-2	Sapucaiense	Caxias do Sul
2008 Feb 20	Novo Hamburgo	1-2	Ulbra	Novo Hamburgo
2008 Feb 21	Santa Cruz	1-0	15 de Novembro	Santa Cruz do Sul
2008 Feb 21	Grêmio	2-1	Esportivo	Porto Alegre

Date	Match			Venue
2008 Feb 23	Sapucaiense	1-1	Caxias	São Leopoldo
2008 Feb 24	Ulbra	2-5	Novo Hamburgo	Canoas
2008 Feb 24	Esportivo	1-2	Grêmio	Bento Gonçalves
2008 Feb 25	15 de Novembro	3-1	Santa Cruz	Campo Bom
2008 Feb 25	Novo Hamburgo	1-1	15 de Novembro	Novo Hamburgo
2008 Mar 1	Grêmio	4-0	Ulbra	Porto Alegre
2008 Mar 1	Caxias	2-0	Esportivo	Caxias do Sul
2008 Mar 3	Santa Cruz	2-5	Sapucaiense	Santa Cruz do Sul
2008 Mar 6	15 de Novembro	1-2	Sapucaiense	Campo Bom
2008 Mar 8	Santa Cruz	1-2	Esportivo	Santa Cruz do Sul
2008 Mar 9	Ulbra	1-0	Caxias	Canoas
2008 Mar 9	Novo Hamburgo	0-1	Grêmio	Novo Hamburgo
2008 Mar 12	Ulbra	1-0	Santa Cruz	Canoas
2008 Mar 12	Esportivo	1-0	15 de Novembro	Bento Gonçalves
2008 Mar 12	Sapucaiense	1-4	Novo Hamburgo	São Leopoldo
2008 Mar 13	Grêmio	0-0	Caxias	Porto Alegre
2008 Mar 15	Esportivo	1-3	Sapucaiense	Bento Gonçalves
2008 Mar 16	15 de Novembro	2-3	Ulbra	Campo Bom
2008 Mar 16	Santa Cruz	2-3	Grêmio	Santa Cruz do Sul
2008 Mar 16	Caxias	4-1	Novo Hamburgo	Caxias do Sul
2008 Mar 20	Grêmio	2-0	Sapucaiense	Porto Alegre
2008 Mar 22	Caxias	3-0	15 de Novembro	Caxias do Sul
2008 Mar 22	Ulbra	1-1	Esportivo	Canoas
2008 Mar 22	Novo Hamburgo	3-2	Santa Cruz	Novo Hamburgo
2008 Mar 26	Sapucaiense	2-1	Ulbra	São Leopoldo
2008 Mar 26	Santa Cruz	2-0	Caxias	Santa Cruz do Sul
2008 Mar 26	Esportivo	2-3	Novo Hamburgo	Bento Gonçalves
2008 Mar 26	15 de Novembro	1-4	Grêmio	Campo Bom

=== Group 2 ===
Pos	Team	Pld	W	D	L	GF	GA	GD	Pts	Qualification or relegation
1	Internacional	14	10	2	2	34	9	+25	32	Advance to Quarterfinals
2	Internacional (SM)	14	7	5	2	25	20	+5	26	Advance to Quarterfinals
3	São José	14	6	4	4	19	20	−1	22	Advance to Quarterfinals
4	Juventude	14	6	2	6	17	15	+2	20	Advance to Quarterfinals
5	São Luiz	14	5	5	4	22	18	+4	20	
6	Veranópolis	14	5	3	6	21	23	−2	18	
7	Brasil	14	5	1	8	22	26	−4	16	
8	Guarany	14	1	0	13	12	41	−29	3	Second Division 2009

==== Fixtures ====
Date	Match			Venue
2008 Jan 20	São Luiz	3-1	Brasil	Ijuí
2008 Jan 20	São José	2-0	Juventude	Porto Alegre
2008 Jan 20	Internacional (SM)	2-2	Internacional	Santa Maria
2008 Jan 20	Veranópolis	4-1	Guarany	Veranópolis
2008 Jan 23	Brasil	4-1	São José	Pelotas
2008 Jan 24	Internacional	2-0	Veranópolis	Porto Alegre
2008 Jan 24	Juventude	2-2	Internacional (SM)	Caxias do Sul
2008 Jan 24	Guarany	1-3	São Luiz	Bagé
2008 Jan 27	São José	1-4	Internacional	Porto Alegre
2008 Jan 27	Internacional (SM)	3-2	Guarany	Santa Maria
2008 Jan 27	Juventude	2-1	Brasil	Caxias do Sul
2008 Jan 28	São Luiz	1-0	Veranópolis	Ijuí
2008 Jan 30	Guarany	1-3	São José	Bagé
2008 Feb 1	Veranópolis	2-1	Brasil	Veranópolis
2008 Feb 1	Internacional (SM)	1-0	São Luiz	Santa Maria
2008 Feb 1	Internacional	0-1	Juventude	Porto Alegre
2008 Feb 8	Guarany	1-0	Juventude	Bagé
2008 Feb 10	Brasil	0-5	Internacional	Pelotas
2008 Feb 10	Veranópolis	2-3	Internacional (SM)	Veranópolis
2008 Feb 11	São Luiz	0-0	São José	Ijuí
2008 Feb 16	Internacional	2-0	Guarany	Porto Alegre
2008 Feb 16	Juventude	2-0	São Luiz	Caxias do Sul
2008 Feb 16	São José	1-1	Veranópolis	Porto Alegre
2008 Feb 17	Brasil	2-3	Internacional (SM)	Pelotas
2008 Feb 19	Veranópolis	2-1	Juventude	Veranópolis
2008 Feb 20	Guarany	0-3	Brasil	Bagé
2008 Feb 20	São Luiz	1-1	Internacional	Ijuí
2008 Feb 21	Internacional (SM)	1-0	São José	Santa Maria

Date	Match			Venue
2008 Feb 22	Juventude	2-0	Veranópolis	Caxias do Sul
2008 Feb 23	Internacional	3-0	São Luiz	Porto Alegre
2008 Feb 24	Brasil	2-0	Guarany	Pelotas
2008 Feb 25	São José	1-0	Internacional (SM)	Porto Alegre
2008 Feb 29	Internacional (SM)	3-2	Brasil	Santa Maria
2008 Mar 2	Veranópolis	2-2	São José	Veranópolis
2008 Mar 2	Guarany	0-6	Internacional	Bagé
2008 Mar 2	São Luiz	4-0	Juventude	Ijuí
2008 Mar 6	Internacional (SM)	1-1	Veranópolis	Santa Maria
2008 Mar 8	Internacional	2-0	Brasil	Veranópolis
2008 Mar 8	Juventude	2-0	Guarany	Caxias do Sul
2008 Mar 8	São José	1-1	São Luiz	Porto Alegre
2008 Mar 12	São Luiz	2-2	Internacional (SM)	Ijuí
2008 Mar 12	São José	3-2	Guarany	Porto Alegre
2008 Mar 12	Juventude	3-0	Internacional	Caxias do Sul
2008 Mar 13	Brasil	2-1	Veranópolis	Pelotas
2008 Mar 15	Internacional	2-0	São José	Porto Alegre
2008 Mar 15	Guarany	1-3	Internacional (SM)	Bagé
2008 Mar 16	Brasil	1-0	Juventude	Pelotas
2008 Mar 18	Veranópolis	3-1	São Luiz	Veranópolis
2008 Mar 21	São José	2-1	Brasil	Porto Alegre
2008 Mar 22	Internacional (SM)	1-1	Juventude	Santa Maria
2008 Mar 23	São Luiz	4-1	Guarany	Ijuí
2008 Mar 23	Veranópolis	1-3	Internacional	Veranópolis
2008 Mar 27	Guarany	2-3	Veranópolis	Bagé
2008 Mar 27	Juventude	1-2	São José	Caxias do Sul
2008 Mar 27	Brasil	2-2	São Luiz	Pelotas
2008 Mar 27	Internacional	2-0	Internacional (SM)	Porto Alegre

== Quarterfinals ==
First Leg: 29 and 30 March
Second Leg: 5 and 6 April

Team 1 plays the second leg at home

Team 1	Total	Team 2	First	Second
Grêmio	5-5*	Juventude	2-1	2-3
Internacional	7-3	Ulbra	4-1	3-2
Internacional (SM)	3-2	Sapucaiense	1-2	2-0
Caxias	2-1	São José	1-1	1-0

Juventude won on away goals rule.

== Semifinals ==
First Leg: 13 and 15 April
Second Leg: 20 April

Team 1 plays the second leg at home

Team 1	Total	Team 2	First	Second
Internacional (SM)	3-4	Juventude	1-0	2-4
Internacional	3-1	Caxias	1-0	2-1

== Final ==
First Leg: 27 April
Second Leg: 4 May

Team 1 plays the second leg at home

Team 1	Total	Team 2	First	Second
Internacional	8-2	Juventude	0-1	8-1

== Goals ==
=== Top Goal scorers ===
Scorer	Goals	Team
(Brazil) Mendes	13	Juventude
(Brazil) Alex	13	Internacional
(Brazil) Ronaldo Capixaba	9	São Luiz
(Brazil) Júnior Paulista	7	São José
(Brazil) Iarley	7	Internacional
