= 1998 Campeonato Brasileiro Série A =

Campeonato Brasileiro Série A
- Season: 1998
- Champions: Corinthians (2nd title)
- Relegated: América-MG; Goiás; Bragantino; América-RN
- Copa Libertadores: Corinthians; Vasco da Gama (title holders); Palmeiras (via Copa do Brasil)
- Matches: 297
- Goals: 851 (2.87 per match)
- Top goalscorer: Viola (21 goals)

The 1998 Campeonato Brasileiro Série A was the 42nd edition of the Campeonato Brasileiro Série A, the top-level of professional football in Brazil.

== Overview ==
It was contested by 24 teams, and Corinthians won the championship.

== First phase ==
Pos	Team	Pld	W	D	L	GF	GA	GD	Pts	Qualification or relegation
1	Corinthians	23	14	4	5	46	30	+16	46	Qualified to Quarterfinals
2	Palmeiras	23	14	3	6	46	32	+14	45	Qualified to Quarterfinals
3	Coritiba	23	11	9	3	32	26	+6	42	Qualified to Quarterfinals
4	Santos	23	11	8	4	46	29	+17	41	Qualified to Quarterfinals
5	Sport Recife	23	12	4	7	34	22	+12	40	Qualified to Quarterfinals
6	Portuguesa	23	11	7	5	44	34	+10	40	Qualified to Quarterfinals
7	Cruzeiro	23	10	7	6	42	28	+14	37	Qualified to Quarterfinals
8	Grêmio	23	10	6	7	32	30	+2	36	Qualified to Quarterfinals
9	Atlético Mineiro	23	9	9	5	38	33	+5	36	
10	Vasco da Gama	23	9	7	7	34	24	+10	34	
11	Flamengo	23	9	6	8	37	34	+3	33	
12	Internacional	23	9	5	9	25	25	0	32	
13	Vitória	23	9	3	11	31	38	−7	30	
14	Botafogo	23	7	8	8	35	37	−2	29	
15	São Paulo	23	8	3	12	34	35	−1	27	
16	Atlético-PR	23	7	6	10	32	32	0	27	
17	Ponte Preta	23	7	5	11	25	34	−9	26	
18	Juventude	23	6	8	9	24	32	−8	26	
19	Guarani	23	6	7	10	34	39	−5	25	
20	Paraná	23	7	3	13	25	41	−16	24	
21	América-MG	23	6	5	12	26	39	−13	23	Relegated to 1999 Série B
22	Goiás	23	5	7	11	29	37	−8	22	Relegated to 1999 Série B
23	Bragantino	23	5	6	12	20	37	−17	21	Relegated to 1999 Série B
24	América-RN	23	3	6	14	24	47	−23	15	Relegated to 1999 Série B

== Quarterfinals ==
Teams			Scores			
Team 1	Points	Team 2	1st leg	2nd leg	3rd leg	Agg.
Cruzeiro (Minas Gerais)	6:3	(São Paulo (state)) Palmeiras	2:1	1:2	3:2	6:5
Portuguesa (São Paulo (state))	5:2	(Paraná (state)) Coritiba	3:1	0:0	2:2	5:3
Sport (Pernambuco)	3:6	(São Paulo (state)) Santos	3:1	1:2	0:3	4:6
Grêmio (Rio Grande do Sul)	3:6	(São Paulo (state)) Corinthians	0:1	2:0	0:1	2:2

== Semifinals ==
Teams			Scores			
Team 1	Points	Team 2	1st leg	2nd leg	3rd leg	Agg.
Cruzeiro (Minas Gerais)	6:3	(São Paulo (state)) Portuguesa	3:1	1:2	1:0	5:3
Santos (São Paulo (state))	4:4	(São Paulo (state)) Corinthians	2:1	0:2	1:1	3:4

== Finals ==
=== First leg ===
3 December 1998
19:10 (UTC-3)

Cruzeiro (Minas Gerais)	2 – 2	(São Paulo (state)) Corinthians
Valdo 2'; Müller 43'		Dinei 53'; Marcelinho Carioca 56'

Mineirão, Belo Horizonte (MG)
Attendance: 87,619
Referee: (Rio Grande do Sul) Carlos Eugênio Simon

=== Second leg ===
20 December 1998
18:10 (UTC-3)

Corinthians (São Paulo (state))	1 – 1	(Minas Gerais) Cruzeiro
Marcelinho Carioca 58'		Marcelo Ramos 69'

Morumbi, São Paulo (SP)
Attendance: 50,187
Referee: (Federal District (Brazil)) Luciano Augusto Almeida

=== Replay ===
23 December 1998
21:40 (UTC-3)

Corinthians (São Paulo (state))	2 – 0	(Minas Gerais) Cruzeiro
Edílson 70'; Marcelinho Carioca 80'

Morumbi, São Paulo (SP)
Attendance: 57,230
Referee: (Rio Grande do Sul) Carlos Eugênio Simon

== Final standings ==
Pos	Team	Pld	W	D	L	GF	GA	GD	Pts	Qualification or relegation
1	Corinthians	32	18	7	7	57	38	+19	61	Qualified to 2000 FIFA Club World Championship (Note: Corinthians also qualified for the group stage of the 1999 Copa Libertadores as the Campeonato Brasileiro Série A champion.)
2	Cruzeiro	32	14	9	9	56	41	+15	51	
3	Santos	29	14	9	6	55	37	+18	51	
4	Portuguesa	29	13	9	7	52	42	+10	48	
5	Palmeiras	26	15	3	8	51	38	+13	48	Qualified to 1999 Copa Libertadores (Note: Palmeiras qualified for the group stage of the 1999 Copa Libertadores as the 1998 Copa do Brasil champion.)
6	Coritiba	26	11	11	4	35	31	+4	44	
7	Sport	26	13	4	9	38	28	+10	43	
8	Grêmio	26	11	6	9	34	32	+2	39	
9	Atlético Mineiro	23	9	9	5	38	33	+5	36	
10	Vasco da Gama	23	9	7	7	34	24	+10	34	Qualified to 1999 Copa Libertadores (Note: Vasco da Gama is qualified for the round of 16 of the 1999 Copa Libertadores as the 1998 Copa Libertadores champion.)
11	Flamengo	23	9	6	8	37	34	+3	33	
12	Internacional	23	9	5	9	25	25	0	32	
13	Vitória	23	9	3	11	31	38	−7	30	
14	Botafogo	23	7	8	8	35	37	−2	29	
15	São Paulo	23	8	3	12	34	35	−1	27	
16	Atlético-PR	23	7	6	10	32	32	0	27	
17	Ponte Preta	23	7	5	11	25	34	−9	26	
18	Juventude	23	6	8	9	24	32	−8	26	
19	Guarani	23	6	7	10	34	39	−5	25	
20	Paraná	23	7	3	13	25	41	−16	24	
21	América-MG	23	6	5	12	26	39	−13	23	Relegated to 1999 Série B
22	Goiás	23	5	7	11	29	37	−8	22	Relegated to 1999 Série B
23	Bragantino	23	5	6	12	20	37	−17	21	Relegated to 1999 Série B
24	América-RN	23	3	6	14	24	47	−23	15	Relegated to 1999 Série B

== Top scorers ==
Pos.	Scorer	Club	Goals
1	(Brazil) Viola	Santos	21
2	(Brazil) Marcelinho Carioca	Corinthians	19
3	(Brazil) Fábio Júnior	Cruzeiro	18
3	(Brazil) Valdir	Atlético Mineiro	18
4	(Brazil) Edílson	Corinthians	15
4	(Brazil) Leandro Amaral	Portuguesa	15
5	(Brazil) Romário	Flamengo	14
5	(Federal Republic of Yugoslavia) Dejan Petković	Vitória	14
