= 2007 Campeonato Mineiro =

Campeonato Mineiro de Futebol do Módulo I
- Season: 2007
- Champions: Atlético (39th title)
- Relegated: América; Caldense
- 2008 CB: Atlético Mineiro; Democrata-GV
- 2007 Série C: Democrata-GV; Tupi; Villa Nova
- Matches: 72
- Goals: 198 (2.75 per match)
- Top goalscorer: Araújo (Cruzeiro) - 11 goals
- Biggest home win: Cruzeiro 4-0 Guarani (January 27, 2007); Cruzeiro 6-2 Tupi (March 17, 2007)
- Biggest away win: Guarani 0-4 Atlético (March 3, 2007)
- Highest scoring: Ipatinga 3-5 Democrata-GV (February 22, 2007); Cruzeiro 6-2 Tupi (March 17, 2007)

The 2007 Campeonato Mineiro de Futebol do Módulo I was the 93rd season of Minas Gerais's top-flight professional football league. The season began on January 21 and ended on May 6. Atlético won the title for the 39th time.

== Participating teams ==
Locations of the 2007 Módulo I teams

Club	Home city	Previous season
América	Belo Horizonte	4th
Atlético	Belo Horizonte	3rd
Caldense	Poços de Caldas	7th
Cruzeiro	Belo Horizonte	1st
Democrata	Governador Valadares	8th
Democrata	Sete Lagoas	6th
Guarani	Divinópolis	10th
Ipatinga	Ipatinga	2nd
Ituiutaba	Ituiutaba	5th
Rio Branco	Andradas	1st (Second level)
Tupi	Juíz de Fora	2nd (Second level)
Villa Nova	Nova Lima	9th

== League table ==
Pos	Team	Pld	W	D	L	GF	GA	GD	Pts	Qualification or relegation
1	Cruzeiro	11	8	1	2	31	16	+15	25	Qualified to the Semifinals
2	Atlético	11	6	2	3	18	9	+9	20	Qualified to the Semifinals
3	Democrata-GV	11	6	2	3	20	15	+5	20	Qualified to the Semifinals
4	Tupi	11	6	2	3	19	16	+3	20	Qualified to the Semifinals
5	Villa Nova	11	5	4	2	21	16	+5	19	
6	Rio Branco	11	4	4	3	10	8	+2	16	
7	Ipatinga	11	5	0	6	18	16	+2	15	
8	Democrata-SL	11	4	2	5	10	13	−3	14	
9	Ituiutaba	11	3	2	6	10	17	−7	11	
10	Guarani	11	3	2	6	9	20	−11	11	
11	Caldense	11	2	3	6	10	20	−10	9	Relegated
12	América	11	1	2	8	10	20	−10	5	Relegated

Updated to match(es) played on May 6, 2007. Source: RSSSF.com
Rules for classification: 1) points; 2) wins; 3) goal difference; 4) number of goals scored.

=== Final Tournament ===
Semi-finals
4th	Tupi	0	0	0
1st	Cruzeiro	0	4	4
3rd	Democrata-GV	1	1	2
2nd	Atlético	2	1	3

Finals
1st	Cruzeiro	0	2	2
2nd	Atlético	4	0	4

== Finals ==
=== First leg ===
2007-04-29
16:00 (UTC-3)

Atlético	4 – 0	Cruzeiro
Éder Luís 46'; Danilinho 82'; Marcinho 88'; Vanderlei 89'	(Report) (pt)

Mineirão, Belo Horizonte
Attendance: 40,605
Referee: Cléver Assunção Gonçalves

=== Second leg ===
2007-05-06
16:00 (UTC-3)

Cruzeiro	2 – 0	Atlético
Guilherme 8'; Wellington 43'	(Report) (pt)

Mineirão, Belo Horizonte
Attendance: 42,475
Referee: Álvaro Quelhas

Campeonato Mineiro
2007 champion

39th title
