= Salete =

- Municipality
- Flag Coat of arms

- Location of Salete

- Location in Brazil
- Country: Brazil
- Region: South
- State: Santa Catarina
- Mesoregion: Vale do Itajai

Government
  - Mayor: Solange B. Schlichting

Area
  - Total: 68.722 sq mi (177.988 km^{2})
- Elevation: 1,600 ft (500 m)

Population (2020)
  - Total: 7,659
  - Density: 111.4/sq mi (43.03/km^{2})
- Time zone: UTC -3
- Postal code: 4215307
- Website: www.salete.sc.gov.br

Salete is a municipality in the state of Santa Catarina in the South region of Brazil.

== History ==
Salete received municipality status by state law No. 799 of December 20, 1961, with territory taken from Taió.

== See also ==
- List of municipalities in Santa Catarina
