= Claudio Milar =

Uruguayan footballer (1974–2009)

Personal information
- Full name: Roberto Claudio Milar Decuadra
- Date of birth: 6 April 1974
- Place of birth: Chuy, Uruguay
- Date of death: 16 January 2009 (aged 34)
- Place of death: Canguçu-RS, Brazil
- Position: Striker

Senior career*
Years	Team	Apps	(Gls)
1991–1993	Danubio		
1993–1996	Nacional		
1996–1997	Godoy Cruz		
1997	Juventude		
1998	Caxias		
1999	Portuguesa Santista		
1999	Santa Cruz		
1999	Náutico		
2000	ŁKS Łódź	12	(2)
2000	Matonense		
2001	Club Africain		
2001	Botafogo	5	(0)
2002	Pelotas		
2002-2003	Hapoel Kfar Saba	26	(2)
2003–2004	Brasil de Pelotas		
2004	Pogoń Szczecin	16	(6)
2005	Brasil de Pelotas		
2005–2006	Pogoń Szczecin	15	(5)
2006–2009	Brasil de Pelotas	209	(111)

International career
1994	Uruguay U-20		
- * Club domestic league appearances and goals

Roberto Claudio Milar Decuadra (6 April 1974 – 16 January 2009), or simply Claudio Milar, was an Uruguayan football striker, who played last for Brasil de Pelotas.

== Career ==
He started in the youth categories of Nacional Montevideo. Other professional clubs: Juventude (Brazil), Portuguesa (Brazil), Santa Cruz (Brazil), Matonense (Brazil), Brasil de Pelotas (Brasil) ŁKS Łódź (Poland), Club Africain (Tunisia), Botafogo (Brazil), Hapoel Kfar Saba (Israel), and MKS Pogoń Szczecin.

He came back to Brasil de Pelotas in 2009. Claudio had first played for the third division club in 2002, and scored over 100 goals in just over 200 games in his career there.

== Death ==
On January 16, 2009, Claudio, one of his teammates, Régis, and the goalkeeper coach Giovani Guimarães were killed in a bus accident in Canguçu, Brazil. The bus tumbled into a 130-foot ravine while returning with the rest of the team after an exhibition victory over Santa Cruz, another third division club.

== Reactions ==
On 19 February 2009, in a match between Brasil Pelotas and Ulbra Canoas, striker Rogério Pereira celebrated the final goal in Ulbra's 5–2 away win by heading over to the home supporters and making a gesture said to be imitating Claudio Milar's goal celebrations. This infuriated the home fans and many of the late Milar's teammates who instantly set upon Pereira. The Ulbra striker received many kicks and punches, before the scene was calmed down by the referee and his assistants, albeit not before 3 Ulbra players and 4 Brasil players were sent off. His last club Brasil de Pelotas retired his number 7 shirt.
