= Danrlei =

Brazilian footballer (born 1973)

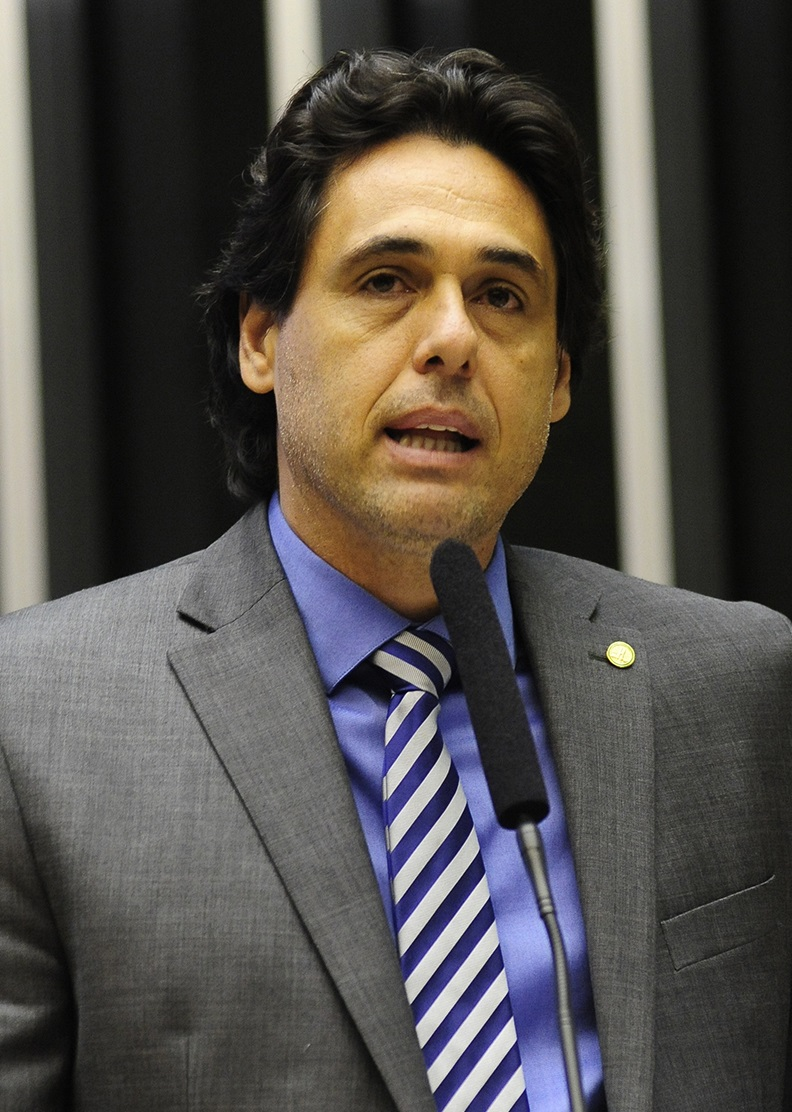

Personal information
- Full name: Danrlei de Deus Hinterholz
- Date of birth: 18 April 1973 (age 53)
- Place of birth: Crissiumal, Brazil
- Height: 1.85 m (6 ft 1 in)
- Position: Goalkeeper

Senior career*
Years	Team	Apps	(Gls)
1993–2003	Grêmio	594	(0)
2004	Fluminense	3	(0)
2004–2005	Atlético Mineiro	67	(0)
2006	Beira-Mar	10	(0)
2007	São José-RS	6	(0)
2007	Remo	17	(0)
2009	Brasil de Pelotas	24	(0)

International career
1995	Brazil	7	(0)
Medal record
Representing Brazil
Men's Football
Bronze medal – third place	1996 Atlanta	Team competition
- * Club domestic league appearances and goals

Danrlei de Deus Hinterholz, or just Danrlei (born 18 April 1973) is a retired Brazilian footballer who played as a goalkeeper.

He made his debut for the Brazil national team against Honduras in March 1995, and played three additional games during the run-up to the 1996 Olympic Games. He did not appear in any Olympic matches. He won many titles with Grêmio, most notably the Copa Libertadores in 1995.

Danrlei was injured on 2009 Brasil de Pelotas bus disaster after plunged off a 130-foot ravine while travelling back from a match.
