= 1998 Campeonato Brasileiro Série B =

Campeonato Brasileiro Série B
- Season: 1998
- Champions: Gama
- Promoted: Gama; Botafogo-SP
- Relegated: Fluminense; Atlético-GO; Náutico; Juventus; Volta Redonda; Americano
- Top goalscorer: Gauchinho (XV de Piracicaba) - 13
- Biggest home win: XV de Piracicaba 6-0 Ceará (September 6, 1998)

The football (soccer) Campeonato Brasileiro Série B 1998, the second level of Brazilian National League, was played from August 2 to December 20, 1998. The competition had 24 clubs and two of them were promoted to Série A and six were relegated to Série C. The competition was won by Gama.

Gama finished the final phase group with the most points, and was declared 1999 Brazilian Série B champions, claiming the promotion to the 1999 Série A along with Botafogo-SP, the runners-up. The six worst ranked teams in the first round (Fluminense, Atlético-GO, Náutico, Juventus, Volta Redonda and Americano) were relegated to play Série C in 1999.

== Teams ==
Team	City	Stadium	1997 Season
ABC	Natal	Machadão	14th in Série B
Americano	Rio de Janeiro	Godofredo Cruz	13th in Série B
Atlético-GO	Goiânia	Serra Dourada	16th in Série B
Bahia	Salvador	Fonte Nova	23rd in Série A
Botafogo-SP	Ribeirão Preto	Santa Cruz	17th in Série B
Ceará	Fortaleza	Castelão	9th in Série B
CRB	Maceió	Pajuçara	5th in Série B
Criciúma	Criciúma	Heriberto Hülse	24th in Série A
Desportiva	Cariacica	Engenheiro Araripe	12th in Série B
Fluminense	Rio de Janeiro	Maracanã	25th in Série A
Gama	Gama	Bezerrão	7th in Série B
Joinville	Joinville	Ernestão	6th in Série B
Juventus	São Paulo	Rua Javari	2nd in Série C
Londrina	Londrina	Café	10th in Série B
Náutico	Recife	Aflitos	3rd in Série B
Paysandu	Belém	Curuzú	11th in Série B
Remo	Belém	Mangueirão	18th in Série B
Santa Cruz	Recife	Arruda	20th in Série B
Sampaio Corrêa	São Luís	Castelão	1st in Série C
Tuna Luso	Belém	Francisco Vasques	8th in Série B
União São João	Araras	Herminião	26th in Série A
Vila Nova	Goiânia	Serra Dourada	4th in Série B
Volta Redonda	Volta Redonda	Raulino de Oliveira	19th in Série B
XV de Piracicaba	Piracicaba	Barão da Serra Negra	15th in Série B

== First phase ==
=== Group A ===
Team	Pld	W	D	L	GF	GA	GD	Pts	Qualification or relegation
(Pará) Remo	10	6	2	2	16	9	+7	20	Advanced to the Round of 16
(Espírito Santo) Desportiva	10	5	1	4	11	10	+1	16	Advanced to the Round of 16
(Paraná (state)) Londrina	10	4	3	3	15	10	+5	15	Advanced to the Round of 16
(São Paulo (state)) União São João	10	3	4	3	7	10	−3	13	Advanced to the Round of 16
(Goiás) Atlético-GO	10	2	4	4	8	10	−2	10	Relegated to 1999 Série C
(Pernambuco) Náutico	10	2	2	6	5	13	−8	8	Relegated to 1999 Série C

=== Group B ===
Team	Pld	W	D	L	GF	GA	GD	Pts	Qualification or relegation
(São Paulo (state)) Botafogo-SP	10	7	0	3	15	7	+8	21	Advanced to the Round of 16
(Pernambuco) Santa Cruz	10	4	4	2	9	8	+1	16	Advanced to the Round of 16
(Santa Catarina (state)) Criciúma	10	5	0	5	17	13	+4	15	Advanced to the Round of 16
(Goiás) Vila Nova	10	4	2	4	16	14	+2	14	Advanced to the Round of 16
(Maranhão) Sampaio Corrêa	10	4	2	4	5	9	−4	14	
(Rio de Janeiro (state)) Volta Redonda	10	2	0	8	8	19	−11	6	Relegated to 1999 Série C

=== Group C ===
Team	Pld	W	D	L	GF	GA	GD	Pts	Qualification or relegation
(São Paulo (state)) XV de Piracicaba	10	8	0	2	24	12	+12	24	Advanced to the Round of 16
Ceará	10	4	3	3	13	16	−3	15	Advanced to the Round of 16
(Pará) Tuna Luso	10	4	2	4	15	10	+5	14	Advanced to the Round of 16
(Federal District (Brazil)) Gama	10	4	1	5	13	12	+1	13	Advanced to the Round of 16
Bahia	10	4	1	5	14	14	0	13	
(Rio de Janeiro (state)) Americano	10	1	3	6	8	23	−15	6	Relegated to 1999 Série C

=== Group D ===
Team	Pld	W	D	L	GF	GA	GD	Pts	Qualification or relegation
(Santa Catarina (state)) Joinville	10	5	2	3	10	8	+2	17	Advanced to the Round of 16
(Rio Grande do Norte) ABC	10	4	3	3	19	15	+4	15	Advanced to the Round of 16
(Pará) Paysandu	10	3	5	2	8	5	+3	14	Advanced to the Round of 16
(Alagoas) CRB	10	3	5	2	8	8	0	14	Advanced to the Round of 16
(Rio de Janeiro (state)) Fluminense	10	2	5	3	12	12	0	11	Relegated to 1999 Série C
(São Paulo (state)) Juventus	10	1	4	5	6	15	−9	7	Relegated to 1999 Série C

== Second phase ==
Teams			Scores			
Team 1	Points	Team 2	1st leg	2nd leg	3rd leg	Agg.
Gama (Federal District (Brazil))	6:0	(Pará) Remo	1:0	4:1	—	5:1
CRB (Alagoas)	4:4	(São Paulo (state)) Botafogo-SP	2:1	0:2	0:0	2:3
União São João (São Paulo (state))	2:5	(Santa Catarina (state)) Joinville	3:3	0:3	0:0	3:6
Tuna Luso (Pará)	1:7	(Espírito Santo) Desportiva	1:1	0:2	1:3	2:6
ABC (Rio Grande do Norte)	3:3	(Paraná (state)) Londrina^{1}	0:0	0:0	1:1	1:1
Ceará	1:7	(Santa Catarina (state)) Criciúma	1:1	0:3	0:2	1:6
Vila Nova (Goiás)	4:4	(São Paulo (state)) XV de Piracicaba	1:0	0:0	0:2	1:2
Paysandu (Pará)	7:1	(Pernambuco) Santa Cruz	2:0	0:0	2:1	4:1

^{1} Londrina qualified after defeating ABC on a penalty shoot-out.

== Third phase ==
=== Group 1 ===
Team	Pld	W	D	L	GF	GA	GD	Pts	Qualification
(Federal District (Brazil)) Gama	6	3	1	2	5	5	0	10	Advanced to the Final phase
(Espírito Santo) Desportiva	6	3	0	3	9	9	0	9	Advanced to the Final phase
(Santa Catarina (state)) Criciúma	6	2	2	2	7	6	+1	8	
(São Paulo (state)) XV de Piracicaba	6	2	1	3	7	8	−1	7	

=== Group 2 ===
Team	Pld	W	D	L	GF	GA	GD	Pts	Qualification
(São Paulo (state)) Botafogo-SP	6	3	1	2	12	10	+2	10	Advanced to the Final phase
(Paraná (state)) Londrina	6	3	1	2	9	7	+2	10	Advanced to the Final phase
(Santa Catarina (state)) Joinville	6	2	2	2	7	10	−3	8	
(Pará) Paysandu	6	1	2	3	8	9	−1	5	

== Final phase ==
Pos	Team	Pld	W	D	L	GF	GA	GD	Pts	Promotion	GAM	BSP	DES	LON
1	Gama	6	2	4	0	10	6	+4	10	Promoted to Série A 1999		1–1	2–2	3–0
2	Botafogo-SP	6	2	3	1	9	5	+4	9	Promoted to Série A 1999	1–2		5–1	1–0
3	Desportiva	6	1	3	2	8	12	−4	6		2–2	1–1		1–0
4	Londrina	6	1	2	3	2	6	−4	5		0–0	0–0	2–1	

== Final standings ==
Pos	Team	Pld	W	D	L	GF	GA	GD	Pts	Promotion or relegation
1	Gama	24	11	6	7	33	24	+9	39	Promoted to 1999 Série A
2	Botafogo-SP	25	13	5	7	39	24	+15	44	Promoted to 1999 Série A
3	Desportiva	25	11	5	9	34	33	+1	38	Reached Final phase group
4	Londrina	25	8	9	8	27	24	+3	33	Reached Final phase group
5	XV de Piracicaba	19	11	2	6	33	21	+12	35	Reached Third phase
6	Criciúma	19	9	3	7	30	20	+10	30	Reached Third phase
7	Joinville	19	8	6	5	23	21	+2	30	Reached Third phase
8	Paysandu	19	6	8	5	20	15	+5	26	Reached Third phase
9	Remo	12	6	2	4	17	14	+3	20	Reached the Second phase
10	Vila Nova	13	5	3	5	17	16	+1	18	Reached the Second phase
11	ABC	13	4	6	3	20	16	+4	18	Reached the Second phase
12	CRB	13	4	6	3	10	11	−1	18	Reached the Second phase
13	Santa Cruz	13	4	5	4	10	12	−2	17	Reached the Second phase
14	Ceará	13	4	4	5	14	22	−8	16	Reached the Second phase
15	Tuna Luso	13	4	3	6	17	16	+1	15	Reached the Second phase
16	União São João	13	3	6	4	10	16	−6	15	Reached the Second phase
17	Sampaio Corrêa	10	4	2	4	5	9	−4	14	
18	Bahia	10	4	1	5	14	14	0	13	
19	Fluminense	10	2	5	3	12	12	0	11	Relegated to 1999 Série C
20	Atlético-GO	10	2	4	4	8	10	−2	10	Relegated to 1999 Série C
21	Náutico	10	2	2	6	5	13	−8	8	Relegated to 1999 Série C
22	Juventus	10	1	4	5	6	15	−9	7	Relegated to 1999 Série C
23	Volta Redonda	10	2	0	8	8	19	−11	6	Relegated to 1999 Série C
24	Americano	10	1	3	6	8	23	−15	6	Relegated to 1999 Série C

== Sources ==
- "Brazil Second Level 1998". rsssf.com.
