= Grêmio Esportivo Sapucaiense =

Sapucaiense
- Full name: Grêmio Esportivo Sapucaiense
- Nicknames: Rubro Negro; Sapuca; Sapo
- Founded: July 28, 1941; 84 years ago
- Ground: Estádio Arthur Mesquita Dias
- Capacity: 2,500
- President: Milton Pinheiro
- League: Campeonato Gaúcho (3rd level)
- 2022: 6th of 16
| Home colors | Away colors |

Grêmio Esportivo Sapucaiense is a Brazilian football club from Sapucaia do Sul, Rio Grande do Sul state, founded on July 28, 1941.

== History ==
Grêmio Esportivo Sapucaiense was founded on July 28, 1941, after the closure of Grêmio Esportivo Iraí, a club founded in 1936, with red and black colors, from which Sapucaiense inherited the uniforms and the field, located in the same place where it is now located. Arthur Mesquita Dias.

Since its foundation, until 2004, Sapucaiense was an amateur club that stood out in the municipal championships of Sapucaia do Sul, rivaling traditional amateur teams in the city. Their main opponents were Vera Cruz, Vila Vargas, Sial and Taurus, teams with which Sapucaiense played fierce classics. During this period, he also participated in editions of the Campeonato Gaúcho Amador.

Over the years, Sapucaiense stood out, starting to compete in official competitions of the Gaucho Football Federation with its teams from the basic categories. In 1999, FGF launched an amateur state championship between cities for boys aged up to 21 years, called Copa Sul Sub-21. Sapucaiense represented Sapucaia do Sul and was champion.

This rise of Sapucaiense culminated with its professionalization in 2005, when it started to compete in the Campeonato Gaúcho Série A2 and the Copa FGF.

In 2007, the club was champion of Série A2, a milestone that established the red-black of Sapucaia do Sul in the professional football scene of Rio Grande do Sul and guaranteed the club's access, for the first time, to Gauchão Série A.

Sapucaiense played in the Gauchão Series A for two consecutive years. In 2008, in their debut year, they exceeded expectations and finished the championship in an honorable 6th place. A historic campaign for the club and the city. However, in the 2009 Gauchão, Sapucaiense had a very irregular campaign and ended the competition in 15th place, returning to the A2 Series.

Due to the 3rd place won in the 2010 FGF Cup and the fact that the 2011 Gauchão final was decided by the Grenal duo, Sapucaiense managed to qualify for the 2012 Copa do Brasil. In its first national competition in history, it was eliminated in the 1st phase by the Ponte Preta team.

Sapucaiense has already participated in the Campeonato Gaúcho de Futebol Feminino and also played in men's futsal competitions, having won the Lavoisier Cup in 2013. In addition, the club played in editions of the Campeonato Gaúcho de Futebol Master, having been runner-up twice (2005 and 2006).

== Honours ==
- Campeonato Gaúcho Série A2
  - Winners (1): 2007
