= 1999 Campeonato Brasileiro Série C =

Campeonato Brasileiro Série C
- Season: 1999
- Champions: Fluminense
- Promoted: Fluminense; São Raimundo
- Matches: 224
- Goals: 619 (2.76 per match)
- Top goalscorer: Aldrovani (Figueirense) - 13 goals
- Biggest home win: Caxias 6-0 América-SP (29 September 1999)

The Campeonato Brasileiro Série C 1999, the third level of the Brazilian National Football League, was played from 27 August to 23 December 1999. The competition had 36 clubs and two of them were promoted to Série B.

Fluminense finished the final phase group with most points and was declared 1999 Brazilian Série C champions, claiming the promotion to the 2000 Série B along with São Raimundo, the runners-up. However, with the creation of the Copa João Havelange, Fluminense was promoted directly to the equivalent of the Série A, the Group Blue, while five quarterfinalists (Serra, Náutico, Figueirense, Caxias and Americano), along with Brasil de Pelotas, Villa Nova (reached the second phase), Bangu, Fortaleza, Anapolina and CSA (eliminated in the first phase) were promoted to the Group Yellow.

== Stages of the competition ==
=== First phase ===
Group A

Pos	Team	Pld	W	D	L	GF	GA	GD	Pts	Qualification
1	(Amazonas (Brazilian state)) São Raimundo	10	7	1	2	21	8	+13	22	Qualified for the second stage
2	(Amazonas (Brazilian state)) Rio Negro	10	6	2	2	24	10	+14	20	Qualified for the second stage
3	(Amapá) Ypiranga	10	5	0	5	19	26	−7	15	Qualified for the second stage
4	(Pará) Castanhal	10	3	3	4	13	18	−5	12	
5	(Rondônia) Ji-Paraná	10	2	3	5	12	20	−8	9	
6	(Acre (state)) Vasco da Gama-AC	10	1	3	6	11	18	−7	6	

Source: rsssf.com

Group B

Pos	Team	Pld	W	D	L	GF	GA	GD	Pts	Qualification
1	(Paraíba) Botafogo-PB	10	6	1	3	19	10	+9	19	Qualified for the second stage
2	(Maranhão) Moto Club	10	6	0	4	13	9	+4	18	Qualified for the second stage
3	(Rio Grande do Norte) Potiguar de Mossoró	10	6	0	4	14	11	+3	18	Qualified for the second stage
4	(Piauí) Picos	10	4	2	4	10	13	−3	14	
5	(Ceará) Fortaleza	10	4	1	5	16	15	+1	13	
6	(Tocantins) Tocantinópolis	10	1	2	7	8	22	−14	5	

Source: rsssf.com

Group C

Pos	Team	Pld	W	D	L	GF	GA	GD	Pts	Qualification
1	(Pernambuco) Náutico	10	8	2	0	25	7	+18	26	Qualified for the second stage
2	Sergipe	10	5	2	3	11	12	−1	17	Qualified for the second stage
3	(Alagoas) CSA	10	3	4	3	14	9	+5	13	
4	(Sergipe) Itabaiana	10	3	3	4	14	16	−2	12	
5	(Pernambuco) Unibol	10	2	4	4	13	16	−3	10	
6	(Bahia) Fluminense de Feira	10	1	1	8	8	25	−17	4	

Source: rsssf.com

Group D

Pos	Team	Pld	W	D	L	GF	GA	GD	Pts	Qualification
1	(Espírito Santo) Serra	10	7	1	2	14	4	+10	22	Qualified for the second stage
2	(Rio de Janeiro (state)) Fluminense	10	7	0	3	17	10	+7	21	Qualified for the second stage
3	(Minas Gerais) Villa Nova	10	5	3	2	13	10	+3	18	Qualified for the second stage
4	(Goiás) Anapolina	10	4	2	4	11	9	+2	14	
5	(Goiás) Goiânia	10	2	2	6	8	15	−7	8	
6	(Federal District (Brazil)) Dom Pedro II	10	0	2	8	6	21	−15	2	

Source: rsssf.com

Group E

Pos	Team	Pld	W	D	L	GF	GA	GD	Pts	Qualification
1	(Rio de Janeiro (state)) Americano	10	6	2	2	13	8	+5	20	Qualified for the second stage
2	(São Paulo (state)) Juventus	10	5	2	3	10	8	+2	17	Qualified for the second stage
3	(Goiás) Atlético Goianiense	10	4	2	4	15	11	+4	14	
4	(Rio de Janeiro (state)) Bangu	10	3	5	2	10	7	+3	14	
5	(Mato Grosso) Juventude-MT	10	4	1	5	8	10	−2	13	
6	(Mato Grosso do Sul) Operário-MS	10	0	4	6	10	22	−12	4	

Source: rsssf.com

Group F

Pos	Team	Pld	W	D	L	GF	GA	GD	Pts	Qualification
1	(Rio Grande do Sul) Caxias	10	5	4	1	20	8	+12	19	Qualified for the second stage
2	(Santa Catarina (state)) Figueirense	10	5	4	1	23	14	+9	19	Qualified for the second stage
3	(Rio Grande do Sul) Brasil de Pelotas	10	5	1	4	16	12	+4	16	Qualified for the second stage
4	(Paraná (state)) Rio Branco-PR	10	4	3	3	17	17	0	15	
5	(São Paulo (state)) América-SP	10	2	3	5	13	25	−12	9	
6	(Rio de Janeiro (state)) Volta Redonda	10	1	1	8	9	22	−13	4	

Source: rsssf.com

=== Second phase ===
Teams			Scores			
Team 1	Points	Team 2	1st leg	2nd leg	3rd leg	Agg.
Figueirense (Santa Catarina (state))	6:0	(Amazonas (Brazilian state)) Rio Negro	3:1	2:0	—	5:1
Ypiranga (Amapá)	0:6	(Pernambuco) Náutico	0:3	0:1	—	0:4
Potiguar de Mossoró (Rio Grande do Norte)	3:6	(Rio de Janeiro (state)) Americano	2:0	0:3	0:2	2:5
Sergipe	6:0	(Paraíba) Botafogo-PB	2:0	3:0	—	5:0
Juventus (São Paulo (state))	1:7	(Rio Grande do Sul) Caxias	0:0	0:3	0:3	0:6
Moto Club' (Maranhão)	1:7	(Rio de Janeiro (state)) Fluminense	1:1	0:1	1:2	2:4
Villa Nova (Minas Gerais)	3:6	(Espírito Santo) Serra	3:1	0:1	1:3	4:5
Brasil de Pelotas (Rio Grande do Sul)	0:6	(Amazonas (Brazilian state)) São Raimundo	0:1	1:4	—	1:5

=== Quarterfinals ===
Teams			Scores			
Team 1	Points	Team 2	1st leg	2nd leg	3rd leg	Agg.
Americano (Rio de Janeiro (state))	1:7	(Rio de Janeiro (state)) Fluminense	1:1	0:4	1:2	2:7
Sergipe	4:4	(Pernambuco) Náutico	2:0	1:1	1:5	4:6
Caxias (Rio Grande do Sul)	4:4	(Espírito Santo) Serra (Note: Serra qualified due to better record on previous phases)	3:1	1:3	0:0	4:4
Figueirense (Santa Catarina (state))	4:4	(Amazonas (Brazilian state)) São Raimundo (Note: São Raimundo qualified due to better record on previous phases)	3:1	0:2	1:1	4:4

=== Final stage ===
Pos	Team	Pld	W	D	L	GF	GA	GD	Pts	FLU	SRA	SER	NAU
1	Fluminense (P)	6	4	1	1	10	6	+4	13		2–0	1–2	2–1
2	São Raimundo (P)	6	3	0	3	9	9	0	9	0–1		2–0	2–1
3	Serra	6	2	1	3	9	13	−4	7	2–2	4–3		0–1
4	Náutico	6	2	0	4	9	9	0	6	1–2	1–2	4–1	

Source: rsssf.com
(P) Promoted to 2000 Série B

== Sources ==
- rsssf.com
