= Canguçu =

City in Rio Grande do Sul, Brazil

Coordinates: 31°24′S 52°41′W

- Municipality
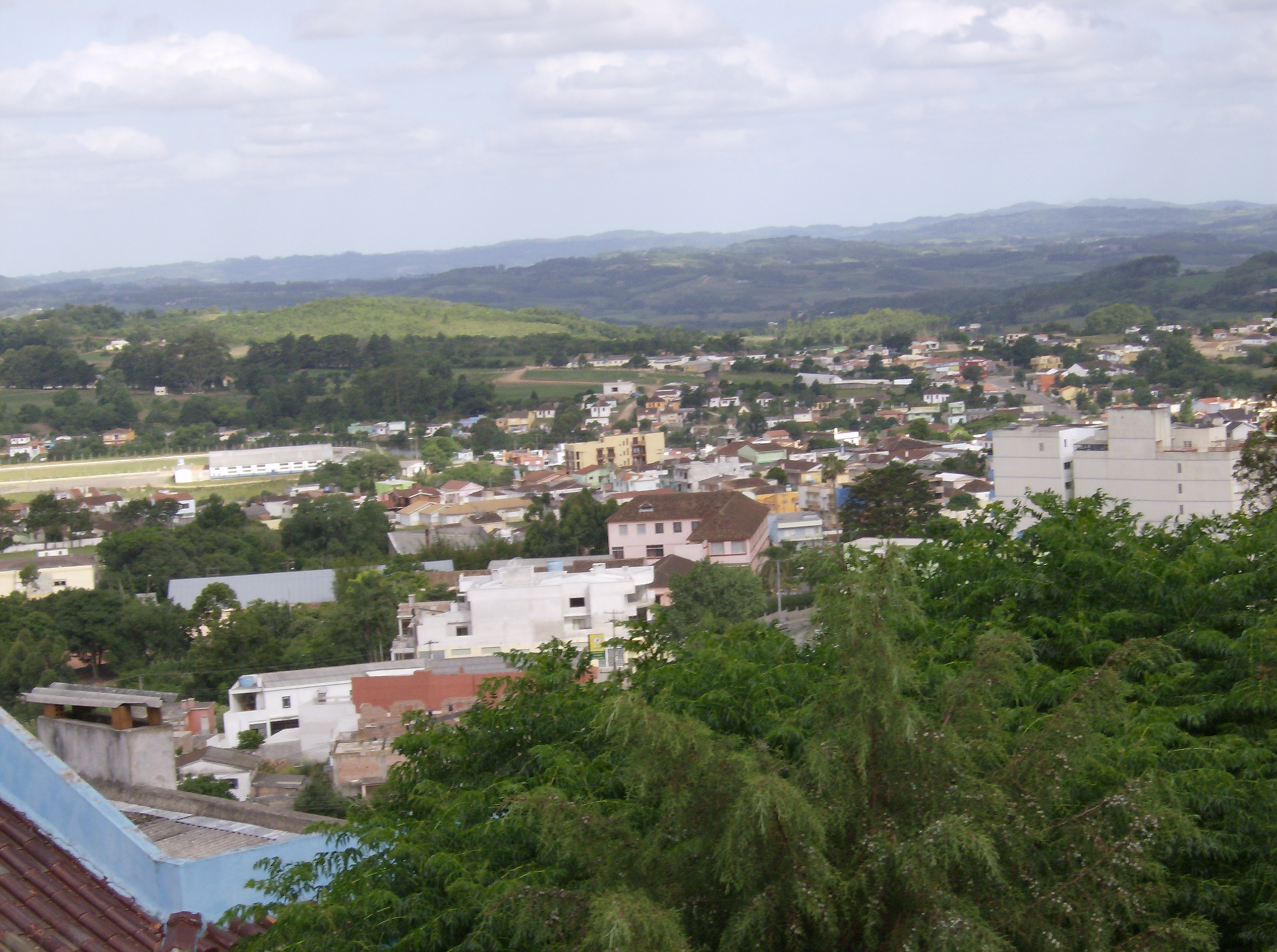

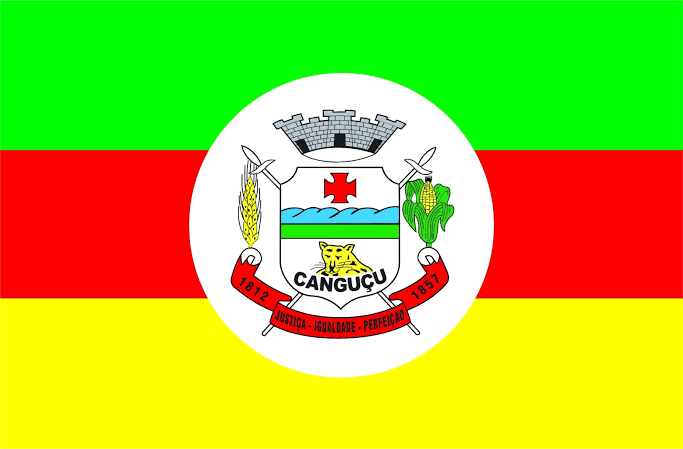
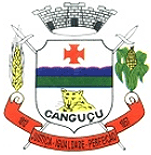
- Flag Coat of arms
- Motto: "Justiça, igualdade, perfeição"
- Location of Canguçu in Rio Grande do Sul
- Country: Brazil
- Region: South
- State: Rio Grande do Sul
- Mesoregion: Sudeste Rio-Grandense
- Microregion: Pelotas
- Founded: 27 June 1857

Government
  - Mayor: Vinícius Pegoraro (MDB, 2021 - 2024)

Area
  - Total: 3,526.253 km^{2} (1,361.494 sq mi)

Population (2021)
  - Total: 56,370
  - Density: 15.99/km^{2} (41.40/sq mi)
- Demonym: Canguçuense
- Time zone: UTC−3 (BRT)
- Website: Official website

Canguçu (population: 56,211) is a city in Rio Grande do Sul, south Brazil. East Pomeranian, a dialect of Low German, has co-official status in Canguçu.

== See also ==
- List of municipalities in Rio Grande do Sul
