= List of newspapers in Brazil =

This is a list of newspapers in Brazil, both national and regional. Newspapers in other languages and newspapers with specific themes are also included.

In 2012, Brazil's newspaper circulation increased by 1.8 percent, compared to the previous year. The average daily circulation of newspapers in Brazil was 4.52 million copies in 2012.

== National ==
Newspaper	Edition city	Ideology	Digital edition
Folha de S.Paulo	São Paulo	Centre-left	https://folha.com
O Estado de S. Paulo	São Paulo	Centre-right	https://estadao.com
O Globo	Rio de Janeiro	Centre	https://oglobo.com
Estado de Minas	Belo Horizonte	Centre	https://www.em.com.br/
Correio Braziliense	Brasília	Centre	https://correiobraziliense.com.br
Gazeta do Povo	Curitiba	Right-wing	https://gazetadopovo.com.br
Zero Hora	Porto Alegre	Centre	https://zerohora.com
Jornal do Brasil	Rio de Janeiro	Centre-left	https://jb.com.br
Brasil de Fato	São Paulo	Far-left	https://brasildefato.com.br
Gazeta Mercantil	São Paulo	Centre	https://gazetamercantil.com
Agora São Paulo	São Paulo	Centre	https://agorasp.com
Mídia Ninja	Nationwide	Left-wing	https://midianinja.org/
Migalhas	Ribeirão Preto	?	https://www.migalhas.com.br/

== Regional ==
=== Acre ===
Newspaper	Edition city	Digital edition
A Gazeta	Rio Branco	https://www.agazeta-acre.com.br
A Tribuna	Rio Branco	https://www.jornalatribuna.com.br
Acre Hoje	Rio Branco	https://www.acrehoje.com
Página 20	Rio Branco	https://web.archive.org/web/20080921012401/http://www.pagina20.com.br/
O Estado do Acre	Rio Branco	https://www.oestadoacre.com
O Rio Branco	Rio Branco	https://www.oriobranco.com.br
Tribuna do Juruá	Cruzeiro do Sul	https://www.tribunadojurua.com

=== Amapá ===
Newspaper	Edition city	Digital edition
Diário do Amapá	Macapá	https://www.diariodoamapa.com.br
Folha do Amapá	Macapá	https://web.archive.org/web/20080905073310/http://folhadoamapa.com.br/
Jornal do Dia	Macapá	https://web.archive.org/web/20080913010527/http://jdia.leiaonline.com.br/
Jornal a Gazeta	Macapá	https://www.jornalagazeta-ap.com

=== Amazonas ===
Newspaper	Edition city	Digital edition
A Crítica	Manaus	https://www.acritica.com.br
Amazonas em Tempo	Manaus	https://emtempo.com.br
Diário do Amazonas	Manaus	https://www.diariodoamazonas.com.br
Folha da Cidade	Manaus	https://www.folhadacidade.com.br
Jornal do Commercio	Manaus	https://www.jcam.com.br
Jornal Maskate	Manaus	https://www.maskate.com.br
Correio Amazonense	Manaus	
Jornal da Ilha	Parintins	https://www.ojornaldailha.com

=== Bahia ===
Newspaper	Edition city	Digital edition
É Notícias	Camaçari	https://enoticias.com.br/
Jornal A Tarde	Salvador	https://www.atarde.com.br
Correio*	Salvador	https://www.correio24horas.com.br
Tribuna da Bahia	Salvador	https://www.tribunadabahia.com.br
Folha da Bahia	Salvador	https://web.archive.org/web/20180307160103/https://folhadabahia.com.br/
A Região	Itabuna and Ilhéus	https://www2.uol.com.br/aregiao
Folha do Estado	Feira de Santana	https://web.archive.org/web/20120416003432/http://www.folhadoestado.net/
Jornal Feira Hoje	Feira de Santana	https://www.feirahoje.com.br
Tribuna Feirense	Feira de Santana	https://www.tribunafeirense.com.br
Novoeste	Barreiras	https://www.novoeste.com
Jornal Gazeta da Lapa	Bom Jesus da Lapa	https://www.jornalgazetadalapa.com.br
Jornal do Sudoeste	Brumado	https://www.jornaldosudoeste.com
Agora	Itabuna	https://web.archive.org/web/20180415194620/https://agora-online.com.br/
Jornal Primeira Página	Jacobina	https://www.jornalprimeirapagina.com.br
A Notícia do Vale	Juazeiro	https://www.anoticiadovale.com
Expressão	Paulo Afonso	https://web.archive.org/web/20080724191338/http://www.sertaonews.com.br/
Tribuna da Costa	Porto Seguro	https://web.archive.org/web/20080724105257/http://www.tribunadacosta.com.br/
Diário do Sudoeste da Bahia	Vitória da Conquista	https://www.dsvc.com.br
Jornal Diário do Sudoeste	Vitória da Conquista	https://web.archive.org/web/20080827212634/http://www.diariosudoeste.com.br/

=== Ceará ===
Newspaper	Edition city	Digital edition
Diário do Nordeste	Fortaleza	https://diariodonordeste.globo.com
O Povo	Fortaleza	https://www.opovo.com.br
Tribuna do Ceará	Fortaleza	https://tribunadoceara.uol.com.br
Ceará Agora	Fortaleza	https://www.cearaagora.com.br/
Jornal A Praça	Iguatu	https://www.jornalapraca.com.br
Miséria	Juazeiro do Norte	https://www.miseria.com.br
Jornal do Cariri	Juazeiro do Norte	https://web.archive.org/web/20080803011400/http://www.rotace.com.br/jornaldocariri/
A Folha Jornal vale em destaque	Sobral Quixeré	https://web.archive.org/web/20081103084402/http://www.afolhadigital.com.br/ https://jornalvaleemdestaqui.blogspot.com/

=== Distrito Federal ===
Newspaper	Edition city	Digital edition
Correio Braziliense	Distrito Federal	https://www.correiobraziliense.com.br
Jornal de Brasília	Brasília	https://web.archive.org/web/20080923115804/http://www.clicabrasilia.com.br/impresso/
Jornal Alô Brasília	Brasília	https://archive.today/20121231121508/http://www.jornalalobrasilia.com.br/
Brasília em Dia	Brasília	https://web.archive.org/web/20080923235755/http://www.brasiliaemdia.com.br/
Fatorama	Brasília	https://web.archive.org/web/20080919151622/http://www.fatorama.com.br/
Jornal da Comunidade	Brasília	https://web.archive.org/web/20090425122749/http://www.jornaldacomunidade.com.br/
Tribuna do Brasil	Brasília	https://web.archive.org/web/20080925060556/http://www.tribunadobrasil.com.br/
Jornal Coletivo	Brasília	https://web.archive.org/web/20120819210202/http://www.jornalcoletivo.com.br/

=== Espírito Santo ===
Newspaper	Edition city	Digital edition
A Gazeta	Vitória	https://www.agazeta.com.br
A Tribuna	Vitória	https://www.tribunaonline.com.br
Notícia Agora	Vitória	
Diário Oficial do Estado do Espírito Santo	Vitória	

=== Goiás ===
Newspaper	Edition city	Digital edition
Jornal Goyaz	Goiânia	https://www.jornalgoyaz.com.br
O Popular	Goiânia	https://www.opopular.com.br/
Brasil em Folhas	Goiânia	https://www.brasilemfolhas.com/
Folha de Goiás	Goiânia	https://folhadegoias.info
Opinião Goiás	Goiânia	https://opiniaogoias.com.br
Folha do Estado de Goiás	Goiânia	https://folhadoestadodegoias.com.br

=== Maranhão ===
Newspaper	Edition city	Digital edition
O Estado do Maranhão	Sao Luis	https://web.archive.org/web/20130709075309/http://imirante.globo.com/oestadoma/

=== Mato Grosso ===
Newspaper	Edition city	Digital edition
Diário de Cuiabá	Cuiabá	https://www.diariodecuiaba.com.br

=== Mato Grosso do Sul ===
Newspaper	Edition city	Digital edition
Progresso	Mato Grosso do Sul	https://www.progresso.com.br

=== Minas Gerais ===
Newspaper	Edition city	Digital edition
Hoje em Dia	Belo Horizonte	https://www.hojeemdia.com.br/
O Tempo	Belo Horizonte	https://www.otempo.com.br
Super Notícia	Belo Horizonte	https://www.otempo.com.br/super-noticia/
Diário do Rio Doce	Governador Valadares	https://drd.com.br/
Diário do Aço	Ipatinga	https://www.diariodoaco.com.br/
A Notícia	João Monlevade	https://www.anoticiaregional.com.br/
Tribuna de Minas	Juiz de Fora	https://tribunademinas.com.br/

=== Pará ===
Newspaper	Edition city	Digital edition
O Liberal	Belém	https://www.ormnews.com.br/oliberal
Diario do Pará	Belém	https://www.diarioonline.com.br

=== Paraná ===
Newspaper	Edition city	Digital edition
Gazeta do Povo	Curitiba	https://www.gazetadopovo.com.br/
Metro Curitiba	Curitiba	https://www.readmetro.com/en/brazil/metro-curitiba/
Tribuna do Paraná	Curitiba	https://www.parana-online.com.br/
Folha de Londrina	Londrina	https://www.folhaweb.com.br/
Jornal de Londrina	Londrina	https://www.jornaldelondrina.com.br
Tribuna do Norte	Apucarana	https://www.tnonline.com.br/
O Diário do Norte do Paraná	Maringá	https://web.archive.org/web/20130605133701/http://maringa.odiario.com/
O Maringá	Maringá	https://omaringa.com.br/

=== Paraíba ===
Newspaper	Edition city	Digital edition
Diario Da Paraiba	Paraíba	https://www.diariodaparaiba.com.br/

=== Pernambuco ===
Newspaper	Edition city	Digital edition
Diário de Pernambuco	Recife	https://www.diariodepernambuco.com.br/
Folha de Pernambuco	Recife	https://www.folhape.com.br/
Jornal do Commercio	Recife	https://jconline.ne10.uol.com.br/

=== Piauí ===
Newspaper	Edition city	Digital edition
Folha de Pernambuca	Estado do Piauí	https://www.folhape.com.br

=== Rio de Janeiro ===
Newspaper	Edition city	Digital edition
O Dia	Rio de Janeiro	https://odia.ig.com.br/
Extra	Rio de Janeiro	https://extra.globo.com
O Fluminense	Niterói	https://ofluminense.com.br/
O Globo	Rio de Janeiro	https://oglobo.globo.com
Jornal do Brasil	Rio de Janeiro	https://www.jb.com.br/
Meia Hora	Rio de Janeiro	https://www.meiahora.ig.com.br

=== Rio Grande do Norte ===
Newspaper	Edition city	Digital edition
O Jornal de Hoje	Natal	https://jornaldehoje.com.br
Tribuna do Norte	Natal	https://tribunadonorte.com.br

=== Rio Grande do Sul ===
Newspaper	Edition city	Digital edition
O Taquaryense	Taquari	
Correio do Povo	Porto Alegre	https://www.correiodopovo.com.br
Diário Gaúcho	Porto Alegre	https://www.diariogaucho.com.br
Pioneiro	Caxias do Sul	https://www.pioneiro.com
Jornal Agora	Rio Grande	https://www.jornalagora.com.br
Diário Popular	Pelotas	https://www.diariopopular.com.br
Diário de Santa Maria	Santa Maria	https://www.diariosm.com.br
Gazeta do Sul	Santa Cruz do Sul	https://www.gaz.com.br

=== Roraima ===
Newspaper	Edition city	Digital edition
BV News	Boa Vista	https://www.bvnews.com.br

=== Santa Catarina ===
Newspaper	Edition city	Digital edition
Diário Catarinense	Florianópolis	diario.com.br
A Notícia	Joinville	an.com.br
Camboriú News	Balneário Camboriú	camboriu.news
Click Camboriú	Balneário Camboriú	clickcamboriu.com.br
Jornal de Santa Catarina	Blumenau	santa.com.br
Notícias do Dia	Florianópolis, Joinville	ndmais.com.br
Diarinho	Itajaí	diarinho.com.br

=== São Paulo ===
Newspaper	Edition city	Digital edition
Folha de S.Paulo	São Paulo	https://www.folha.uol.com.br
O Estado de S. Paulo	São Paulo	https://www.estadao.com.br
A Tribuna	Santos	https://www.atribuna.com.br/
Agora São Paulo	São Paulo	https://www.agorasp.com
Brasil de Fato	São Paulo	https://www.brasildefato.com.br
Cruzeiro do Sul	Sorocaba	https://www.jornalcruzeiro.com.br/
Correio Popular	Campinas	https://www.cpopular.com.br
Diário do Povo	Campinas	https://web.archive.org/web/20090425055824/http://diariodopovo.com.br/
Notícia Já	Campinas	https://www.janoticia.com.br
O Vale	São José dos Campos	https://www.ovale.com.br/
Diário do Grande ABC	Santo André	https://www.dgabc.com.br

=== Sergipe ===
Newspaper	Edition city	Digital edition
Ne Noticias	Aracaju	https://www.nenoticias.com.br/

=== Tocantins ===
Newspaper	Edition city	Digital edition
Jornal do Tocantins	Palmas	https://www.jornaldotocantins.com.br
O Girassol	Palmas	https://www.ogirassol.com.br
Jornal Stylo	Palmas	https://web.archive.org/web/20140717050827/http://www.jornalstylo.com.br/
Jornal Primeira Página	Palmas	https://www.primeirapagina-to.com.br

== Finance newspapers ==
Newspaper	Edition city	Ideology	Digital edition
Jornal do Comércio	Porto Alegre	Centre	https://jcrs.uol.com.br
Valor Econômico	São Paulo	Centre-right	https://www.valor.com.br

== Sports newspapers ==
Newspaper	Edition city	Digital edition
Lance!	Rio de Janeiro	https://www.lancenet.com.br
RJsports	Rio de Janeiro	https://www.rjsports.com.br

== Religion-themed ==
Newspaper	Edition city	Digital edition
Folha Universal	São Paulo	https://folha.arcauniversal.com.br
Jornal Hoje	São Paulo	https://www.jornalhoje.com.br
Tabernáculo	Rio de Janeiro	https://www.tabernaculo.com.br
Jornal de Opinião	Belo Horizonte	https://www.jornaldeopiniao.com.br

== Other languages ==
Newspaper	Edition city	Language	Digital edition
The Rio Times	Rio de Janeiro	English	https://www.riotimesonline.com
Plus55	Brasília	English	https://web.archive.org/web/20160926212107/https://plus55.com/
Comunità Italiana	São Paulo	Italian	https://www.comunitaitaliana.com
Brasil-Post	São Paulo	German	https://brasilpost.com.br
Nikkey Brasil	São Paulo	Japanese	https://www.nikkeybrasil.com.br
São Paulo - Shimbun	São Paulo	Japanese	https://webarchive.loc.gov/all/20020914082038/http%3A//www.spshimbun.com.br/

== Defunct ==
- A Gazeta Esportiva (São Paulo)
- A Notícia (Rio de Janeiro)
- A Plebe (São Paulo)
- Abu al-Hawl (São Paulo)
- Cidade de Santos (Santos)
- Correio da Manhã
- Correio Oficial
- Correio do Sul (Cachoeiro de Itapemirim)
- Diário Carioca
- Diário Fluminense
- Diário Popular (São Paulo)
- Diário de S. Paulo (São Paulo)
- Folha da Manhã (São Paulo)
- Folha da Tarde (São Paulo)
- Gazeta de Notícias (Rio de Janeiro)
- Idade d'Ouro do Brazil (Bahia)
- Jornal da Tarde (São Paulo)
- Jornal do Commercio (Rio de Janeiro)
- Notícias Populares (São Paulo)
- O Jornal
- O Paiz
- O Pasquim
- Pedro II (Fortaleza)
- Luta Democrática
- Última Hora
- ValeParaibano

== See also ==
- List of magazines in Brazil
- Television in Brazil
- Brazilian press
- Black press in Brazil
- List of censored newspapers in Brazil
