= Cosmo On-Line =

Cover of Cosmo On-line

Cosmo On-Line is a generic and news Internet portal operated by media holding company Rede Anhanguera de Comunicação (RAC), located in Campinas, state of São Paulo, Brazil. It is the largest portal of the region, and one of the first to be founded (1996) juat after commercial access to the Internet became available in the country. The portal hosts the websites for the flagship publications of RAC, such as newspapers Correio Popular, Diário do Povo, Notícia Já and Metrópole Magazine.

Cosmo was also an Internet service provider of significance in Campinas, for a while. The operation was sold by RAC to an international company, which later went into bankruptcy.
