= RBS TV Erechim =

RBS TV Erechim (ZYB 620)
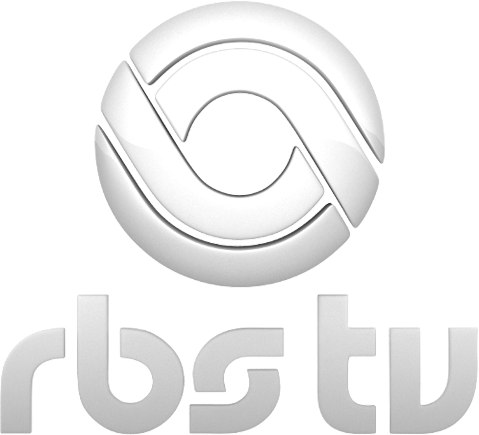
- Erechim, Rio Grande do Sul; Brazil
- Channels: Analog: 2 (VHF); Digital: 33 (UHF); Virtual: 2

Programming
- Affiliations: TV Globo

Ownership
- Owner: Grupo RBS; (Televisão Alto Uruguai S. A.)

History
- Founded: April 30, 1972
- Former names: TV Erexim (1972-1983)

Technical information
- Licensing authority: ANATEL
- Transmitter coordinates: 27°37′39.4″S 52°16′56.0″W

Links
- Website: redeglobo.globo.com/rs/rbstvrs

RBS TV Erechim (channel 2) is a television station in Erechim, Rio Grande do Sul, Brazil, affiliated with TV Globo, member of RBS TV and owned by Grupo RBS. RBS TV Erechim's studios and transmitter are located on Soledade Street, in the Ipiranga district.

== History ==
The station received its construction permit in 1966 to broadcast on VHF channel 2 with an effective radiated power of 1 kilowatt.

TV Erexim was founded on April 30, 1972, by Maurício Sirotsky Sobrinho, being the third television station of Grupo RBS. On October 1, 1983, TV Erexim, along with other RBS TV stations in Rio Grande do Sul and Santa Catarina, was renamed RBS TV Erechim.

== Digital television ==
Channel	Video	Aspect	Programming
2.1	33 UHF	1080i	Main RBS TV Erechim programming / TV Globo

The station inaugurated its digital signal on May 8, 2014, on channel 33 UHF.

=== Transition to digital signal ===
The station planned to shut down its analog signal, over VHF channel 3, on December 31, 2023, as part of the federally mandated transition from analog to digital television. The station's digital signal remains on its pre-transition UHF channel 33, using virtual channel 2. But the transition was delayed indefinitely.

== Programming ==
On August 16, 2019, the local block of Jornal do Almoço was extinguished and on August 19, the station began to relay the regional edition of the news program generated by RBS TV Passo Fundo.
