= RBS TV Uruguaiana =

RBS TV Uruguaiana (ZYP 107)
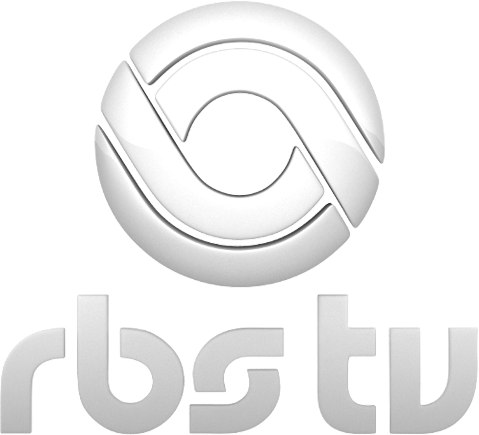
- Uruguaiana, Rio Grande do Sul; Brazil
- Channels: Digital: 34 (UHF); Virtual: 13

Programming
- Affiliations: TV Globo

Ownership
- Owner: Grupo RBS; (Televisão Uruguaiana Ltda.)

History
- First air date: April 2, 1974
- Former call signs: ZYB 619 (1974-2021)
- Former names: TV Uruguaiana (1974-1983)
- Former channel numbers: Analog: 13 (VHF, 1974-2021)

Technical information
- Licensing authority: ANATEL
- Transmitter coordinates: 29°45′17.3″S 57°5′7.2″W

Links
- Public license information: Profile
- Website: redeglobo.globo.com/rs/rbstvrs

RBS TV Uruguaiana (channel 13) is a television station in Uruguaiana, Rio Grande do Sul, Brazil, affiliated with TV Globo, member of RBS TV and owned by Grupo RBS. RBS TV Uruguaiana's studios and transmitter are located on Domingos José de Almeida Street, in the downtown.

== History ==
The station was founded on April 2, 1974, by Maurício Sirotsky Sobrinho, as the sixth station of the network led by TV Gaúcha in Porto Alegre. At that time, the signal coming from the capital arrived in precarious conditions, and the solution found was to transmit all local programming on videotape, which generated a delay of one day in relation to the original transmission.

Years later, these signal problems were remedied after an improvement in microwave links and later with satellite transmission. On October 1, 1983, TV Uruguaiana was renamed RBS TV Uruguaiana, with the standardization of RBS TV stations in Rio Grande do Sul and Santa Catarina.

== Digital television ==
Subchannels of RBS TV Uruguaiana
Channel	Res.	Programming
13.1	1080i	Main RBS TV Uruguaiana programming / TV Globo

The station started its digital broadcasts on April 25, 2014, through channel 34 UHF for the city of Uruguaiana and nearby areas. Until 2019, the year it stopped producing local programs, the station did not show its programming in high definition, with the exception of what was broadcast by RBS TV Porto Alegre and Globo.

=== Transition to digital signal ===
The station turned off its analog signal, over VHF channel 13, on July 30, 2021. The station's digital signal remains on its pre-transition UHF channel 34, using virtual channel 13.

== Programming ==
The broadcaster produced, until July 31, 2019, a local block of Jornal do Almoço with 20 minutes of duration, at the time presented by Elenice Vieira. On August 19, it began to relay the regional block of the newscast generated by RBS TV Santa Maria. The rest of the programming is made up of programs generated by RBS TV Porto Alegre and Globo programs.
