= Américo de Campos =

Américo de Campos may refer to:

- Américo de Campos, São Paulo, municipality in São Paulo, Brazil
- Américo de Campos (lawyer) (1838-1900), Brazilian lawyer, playwright, journalist, politician, and diplomat
