= Armindo Antônio Ranzolin =

Brazilian sports journalist (1937–2022)

- Born: December 8, 1937; Caxias do Sul, Rio Grande do Sul, Brazil
- Died: August 17, 2022 (aged 84); Porto Alegre, Rio Grande do Sul, Brazil
- Occupations: Sports journalist and narrator
- Children: 2 (including Cristina Ranzolin)

Armindo Antônio Ranzolin (December 8, 1937 – August 17, 2022) was a Brazilian sports journalist and narrator. He was director of Rádio Gaúcha, of Grupo RBS.

== Biography ==
Born in the city of Caxias do Sul, Rio Grande do Sul, in a family with northern Italian roots. At the age of one, he moved to Lages, Santa Catarina, where he wrote about amateur sports in a local newspaper. During his childhood, he followed radio coverage of important events such as the suicide of President Getúlio Vargas and the 1950 World Cup, held in Brazil.

His career as a professional journalist and broadcaster began in 1956, as a sports narrator for Rádio Diário da Manhã, in Lages. In 1957, he moved to Porto Alegre, where he graduated in Legal and Social Sciences at the Faculty of Law of UFRGS, in 1962.

After passing a test, Armindo worked for three months at Rádio Guaíba, in 1959. The first time he was aired, there was an internal problem that harmed him. The next day he was dismissed from the radio by the commercial department.

In the same year, he was introduced to the director of Rádio Difusora in Porto Alegre, where he was, for five years, its main sports narrator. It was on Rádio Difusora that Armindo Ranzolin narrated his first Grenal, in 1961. In 1964, he resigned due to problems related to the Military Coup of that year.

Days after leaving Rádio Difusora, he was hired by Rádio Farroupilha as sports director and, soon after, artistic director. In 1969, he left Rádio Farroupilha, accepting an invitation from Rádio Guaíba to be its second announcer. At Radio Guaíba, he participated in major projects and narrated Pelé's games, considered by many to be the greatest football player in history. It was also on Rádio Guaíba that Ranzolin narrated his first World Cup, in 1974, played in Germany.

In 1984, he left Rádio Guaíba, changing radio stations for the last time. Armindo went on to work at Rádio Gaúcha, where he participated, as narrator, in three World Cups, the last of which, in 1994, was held in the United States. He retired from sports narration at the end of 1995, remaining only in journalism, as presenter of "Gaúcha Actualidade". In 1998, he was director of coverage of the World Cup in France. He became the radio's managing director in 1992 and announced his retirement in 2006.

On August 17, 2022, family members announced the death of the communicator at the age of 84. Armindo was admitted to a hospital in Porto Alegre. His death occurred as a result of complications with Alzheimer's disease.

In his honor, since 2023, the trophy awarded to the winner of the men's race at the Porto Alegre International Marathon bears his name.

== Positions and achievements ==
He was the anchor of journalistic programs between 1959 and 2006. He commanded the coverage of all elections on the stations where he worked. He was also an executive, holding the position of programming director at Rádio Difusora and Rádio Farroupilha between 1964 and 1968, superintendent director of TV Piratini in 1969, programming director at Rádio Guaíba between 1976 and 1984, programming manager at Rádio Gaúcha between 1988 and 1992 and director general of Rádio Gaúcha between 1992 and 2006.

He was Vice President of Radio at Association of Radio and Television Stations of Rio Grande do Sul between 1978 and 1984.

In 1996, Ranzolin was admitted by President Fernando Henrique Cardoso to the Order of Military Merit in the rank of Special Officer.

== Personal life ==
From 1963 until his death, Armindo was married to Yara Borges Ranzolin, with whom he had two children: the journalist and presenter of RBS TV (TV Globo-affiliated television station in Rio Grande do Sul), Cristina Ranzolin, and the lawyer Ricardo Ranzolin, and three grandchildren: Henrique, Manoela and Antônia.
