= RBS TV Caxias do Sul =

RBS TV Caxias do Sul (ZYB 615)
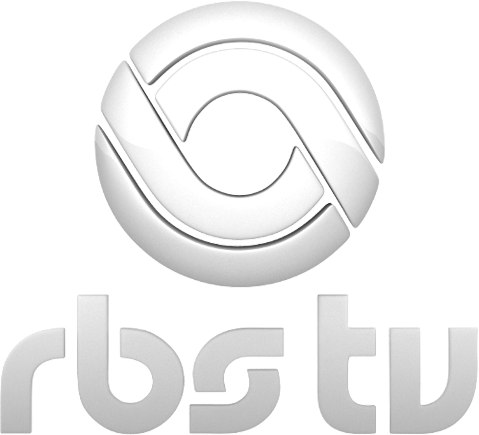
- Caxias do Sul, Rio Grande do Sul; Brazil
- Channels: Digital: 33 (UHF); Virtual: 8

Programming
- Affiliations: TV Globo

Ownership
- Owner: Grupo RBS; (RBS Participações S.A.)

History
- First air date: February 22, 1969
- Former names: TV Caxias (1969-1983)
- Former channel numbers: Analog: 8 (VHF, 1969-2018)

Technical information
- Licensing authority: ANATEL
- Transmitter coordinates: 29°9′42.4″S 51°10′16.7″W

Links
- Website: redeglobo.globo.com/rs/rbstvrs

RBS TV Caxias do Sul (channel 8) is a television station in Caxias do Sul, Rio Grande do Sul, Brazil, affiliated with TV Globo, member of RBS TV and owned by Grupo RBS. It is the oldest television station in the interior of the state, and the most important place for RBS TV in the interior. RBS TV Caxias do Sul's studios are located on Bento Gonçalves Street, in the center of Caxias do Sul, and its transmitter is located at Ítalo Victor Bersani Street, in the Jardim América district.

== History ==
TV Caxias was founded on February 22, 1969, being the first television station in the interior of Rio Grande do Sul. This interiorization initiative was led by Maurício Sirotsky Sobrinho, Ottoni Minghelli and Nestor Rizzo, based on the operational model of regional stations. from United States. In the beginning, TV Caxias produced most of the programming, with emphasis on Hoje na Notícia, Tia Suzi (children), Domingo Alegre and the local edition of Jornal Nacional. The rest of the grid was filled with programs from TV Gaúcha from Porto Alegre.

In 1972, TV Caxias witnessed the first color broadcast on Brazilian television, with the exhibition of the Festa da Uva float parade for the whole country. Still in the 70s, new programs appeared, such as Jornal do Almoço, which gave rise to the Rede Regional de Notícias.

In 1983, the station was renamed RBS TV Caxias do Sul. Thus, the programs on RBS TV Porto Alegre began to have local blocks, a model still used today. In 1984, the station even had a branch in Bento Gonçalves, made up of a journalism team and a commercial office.

In August 2009, Ibope released a survey that confirmed RBS TV Caxias do Sul's audience leadership. The highlight is on the local news program RBS Notícias, which recorded a share of more than 78% between April and June of the same year.

=== Transition to digital signal ===
The station shut down its analog signal, over VHF channel 8, on March 14, 2018, as part of the federally mandated transition from analog to digital television. The station's digital signal remains on its pre-transition UHF channel 33, using virtual channel 8.

== Programming ==
RBS TV Caxias do Sul generates two local blocks of Jornal do Almoço presented by Shirlei Paravisi, who also coordinates the station's television journalism. The team of reporters is made up of Cláudia Alessi, Róger Ruffato, Luiza La-Rocca, Vitória Lovat and sports reporter Rodrigo Cordeiro. Local television news also features video reporter Tainara Alba, who brings the main subjects of the city of Bento Gonçalves. They all produce material for local and state programs and for Rede Globo. Journalism coordination is done by Shirlei Paravisi. It was the first station in the interior of the state to expand the local space of Jornal do Almoço. The remainder of the programming grid is occupied by state programs, generated by RBS TV Porto Alegre, and by national programs from Rede Globo, which RBS TV is affiliated with. In 24 hours of programming, there are 20 minutes of local content.
