= Rosane Marchetti =

Brazilian journalist (born 1960)

- Born: 23 January 1960 (age 66); Nova Prata, Rio Grande do Sul, Brazil
- Occupations: Journalist, TV host and businesswoman
- Children: 1
- Website: http://www.rosanemarchetti.com.br

Rosane Maria Marchetti, better known as Rosane Marchetti (born 23 January 1960), is a Brazilian journalist, TV host and businesswoman.

== Career ==
Marchetti acted for 31 years on RBS TV (TV Globo-affiliated broadcaster in Rio Grande do Sul). She was to Porto Alegre first to study Sociology. After, she was to the Pontifical Catholic University of Rio Grande do Sul study journalism.

When Rosane began her career as a journalist, in 1985, she had already left college working. In the middle of the course, Marchetti auditioned for TV Pampa (now an affiliate of RedeTV! in Rio Grande do Sul).

Before working in television, Rosane worked at Eco do Vale, a newspaper in Bento Gonçalves. This was during a summer vacation. There, she created a page with news from the region, took pictures, wrote texts, sold commercials and even sent the way to diagram.

She has presented several programmes on RBS TV such as Bom Dia Rio Grande, Jornal do Almoço and Campo e Lavoura (the latter is now a part of Galpão Crioulo), in addition to being an occasional presenter of RBS Notícias.

From 1996 onwards, Rosane was editor and anchor of Jornal do Almoço, alongside Cristina Ranzolin, Paulo Sant'Ana and Lasier Martins.

She left the paper's presentation in November 2010, when she became a reporter for the network. In addition, she reports for Jornal Nacional and Globo Repórter, from TV Globo.

In August 2011, Rosane had breast cancer and retired from RBS TV's journalism. returning after nine months of battling cancer, Rosane returned to reporting on RBS TV.

In April 2016, Rosane publicly announced on her social media profile her resignation from RBS TV after 31 years.

On 27 September 2018, she opened her website and created the company Marchetti Comunicação, focusing on the creation and production of own content and for third parties.

In June 2019, she was appointed communications coordinator for the Federal Regional Court of the 4th Region.

== Awards ==
In February 2014, Rosane was the first journalist from Rio Grande do Sul to win Troféu Mulher Imprensa (Press Woman Trophy), in the Best Television News Reporter category, displacing names such as Monalisa Perrone, Delis Ortiz and Zileide Silva, all from TV Globo.

== Personal life ==
Rosane is married to civil servant Luiz Roberto Martins Filho. She is the mother of lawyer Camila Marchetti Reinelli.
