= TVCOM =

- Country: Brazil
- Broadcast area: Greater Porto Alegre
- Headquarters: Porto Alegre, Rio Grande do Sul

Programming
- Language: Brazilian Portuguese
- Picture format: 480i (SDTV)

Ownership
- Owner: Grupo RBS
- Sister channels: RBS TV Porto Alegre

History
- Launched: 15 May 1995
- Closed: 23 November 2015
- Replaced by: OCTO

Links
- Website: www.tvcom.com.br

Availability

Terrestrial
- Analog: 36 UHF (Porto Alegre)

TVCOM (acronym for TV Comunidade (Community TV)) was a Brazilian television station based in the Porto Alegre city, capital of Rio Grande do Sul state, and belonged to the Grupo RBS, a large regional conglomerate, responsible for the RBS TV network. It was established in 1995 with the purpose of being a community channel, and its programming was partially broadcast and fully broadcast on cable TV.

The channel was extinguished in 2015 to make way for the OCTO project, which in turn was discontinued the following year due to low repercussions. The station also had a branch in the Florianópolis city, in the Santa Catarina state, which operated between 2000 and 2017.

== History ==
The idea of designing a community channel arose during the 1990s, after professionals from the Grupo RBS conducted, for two years, research on programs of foreign broadcasters, which operated locally. Surveys are also done to define the attractions of your future broadcaster. Thus, the channel 36 UHF is provided, a frequency that would also allow the transmission via cable TV by the operator NET, while the broadcast in open signal would work partially, which did not hinder the quick negotiation with the advertisers. The group has invested $ 2,000,000 in channel creation and is expected to return $1,600,000 in revenue. TVCOM opened on 15 May 1995, and was broadcast to eleven cities in the Greater Porto Alegre. In 2000, a branch of the station arrives in Florianópolis, Santa Catarina, broadcasting only by the operator NET, also with local programming.

In 2015, it was decided that TVCOM should be replaced by a new television project as the channel had been suffering from Grupo RBS staff cuts since the previous year. During the month of November, reruns of the station's programs and guest interviews that debated the state's main events during the period the station ran were aired. The name chosen for the new project was OCTO, and its launch took place at 7 pm on 23 November, ending TVCOM's operations in Rio Grande do Sul. The brand is still being used in Santa Catarina broadcaster.

On 7 March 2016, the sale of the RBS Group vehicles in Santa Catarina, including TVCOM, to the NC Group is official, but keeping its name and all its programming. On 27 January 2017, the channel's end of operations in February is announced and part of the team would be relocated within the group's companies. Before going live, a stripe informed viewers that the network would be closed on 27 February. At 12:00 AM, the schedule is taken down permanently.

== Slogans ==
- O canal da comunidade (The community channel) – 1995 – 1999
- A nossa TV (Our TV) – 1999 – 2004
- Tá acontecendo, tá na TVCOM (It's happening, it's TVCOM) – 2004 – 2010
- Tudo que é daqui (Everything is here) – 2009 – 2017
