= Marcos Losekann =

Brazilian correspondent (born 1966)

Marcos Losekann (born January 8, 1966) is a Brazilian correspondent who is well known in Brazil for covering important international conflicts and events. He started at RBS TV in Rio Grande do Sul and has not stopped since. He worked in Santa Catarina, Brasilia, Rio de Janeiro and São Paulo before becoming an International Correspondent in 2000. Between 2004 and 2007, he covered Middle East events. Indeed, he recorded several stories about the Israeli–Palestinian conflict from his base of Jerusalem. He returned to Europe to coordinate the Office of Rede Globo in London, where he lived with his ex-wife, Ana Lélia and their children Arthur, Helena and Mariana. Now they live in the capital of Brazil, Brasília.

"My vocation, I believe, is Journalism. Where I practice journalism is just a geographical detail” (Marcos Losekann)

== Early life and career ==
Marcos Losekann was born in Independência, a small town in Rio Grande do Sul, Brazil. He is the only child of Elaine Ciechowics Losekann and Ary Losekann, a truck driver. Losekann was a law student when, as he said, “The journalism chose him”. One night, he was invited by friends to go to a pizzeria, "I had already eaten dinner, there was no reason to be there, and I had no money to pay for the pizza. But I went. And right at the entrance, one person became ill, had a seizure and collapsed. This person was called Flavio Damiani. He was the chief reporter of local TV. "

Damiani was the news boss of TV of RBS Cruz Alta, affiliated with Rede Globo. Losekann began making visits to his new friend and became accustomed to the editorial room routine. Eventually, he ended up being hired and turned out to be a reporter. Within a few months, he scored his first field on Globo in 1984. He also worked in television on Pelotas and Caxias do Sul, and in radio on Gaucha de Porto Alegre (RBS radio). Then, he moved to Santa Catarina, where he continued as a reporter at RBS TV Florianópolis. At age 22, Marcos Losekann became one of the youngest reporters of TV Globo: he was responsible for reporting Santa Catarina state news to National TV. Thanks to this position, Marcos Losekann spawned more than 200 reports of national newscasts between 1988 and 1990. In 1990, TV Globo itself invited him to join its team of special reporters, this time in Brasilia, where Losekann would remain until 1992. His next destination was the Amazônia. Living in Manaus, Marcos Losekann became Globo’s correspondent in the entire Amazon, covering Acre, Rondonia, Amazonas, Amapá, Roraima, Tocantins and Pará as well. He also covered the countries surrounding the Brazilian Amazon. He made his first war coverage in 1994 during the confrontation between Ecuador and Peru. His talents of investigator were noticed as well, having been responsible for the dissemination of numerous cases of corruption, administrative impropriety and local governments in the Amazon area. In addition, he revealed drug trafficking routes in the Amazon, and denounced countless environmental crimes.

In 1995, he was invited to work in TV Globo in Rio de Janeiro. After only five months, Losekann was incorporated into the TV Globo São Paulo team, where he remained until the beginning of 2000.

== War correspondent ==
Between January and July 2000, Marcos worked again in TV Globo in Rio de Janeiro, only to be transferred in August 2000 to London’s Journalism Globe. In 2004, Marcos was again transferred, this time to Jerusalem, where he became the first Brazilian television correspondent in the Middle East. He covered the conflict between Palestinians and Israelis, with reports in Israel, the West Bank and Gaza Strip. The consecration occurred in July 2006, when the war between Israel and Lebanon, more precisely against the militant Lebanese group Hezbollah fundamentalists, burst. During this 33-day war, Losekann covered directly from the Israeli front, where he luckily avoided being shot by missiles fired by Hezbollah militants. In order to provide maximum transparency, balance and impartiality, the correspondent passed the strict Israeli security and crossed the border to show to the Lebanese side the result of the offensive in cities, towns and villages at the border (southern Lebanon). In Beirut, another reporter, Safatli Munir, was in charge of sharing the consequences of the bloody war in the Lebanese capital. Losekann and Safatli then became the first journalists of TV Globo to cover an entire war directly from the front, without interruption in coverage. Thanks to the work of both trenches, the history of this war could be told in a balanced and unbiased way – as the high audience ratings of TV Globo's news programs attested during that period.

== Arrested by Hezbollah ==
On August 15, 2008, Marcos Losekann, his producer and a camera man were doing a story on Dahiye local restaurant inspired in militaries forces when two militants from Hezbollah showed up in a car and ordered them to stop filming. They instantly arrested them. The crew was driven in a van with colored windows. They were separated and each one of them interrogated. They stayed for more than five hours in different rooms when the captors left them on a road on the outskirts of Beirut, without their equipment and belongings. Footage taken by Pimentel and posted on Globo showed the journalists being rushed into a car by Hezbollah militants.

== Writer ==
Marcos Losekann is also a writer. His first book, O Ronco da Pororoca, is inspired by the stories he gathered as a reporter in the Amazon. It was published by Editora Senac in 1999.

The Entrevista com Deus trilogy marks his debut as a novelist. The Editora Planeta has published O Dossiê Iscariotes (2006), Segredo do Salão Verde (2007) and Entre a Cruz e a Suástica (2009). It is fiction, but with traces of reality.

The writer-reporter is currently preparing to write about his experience in the Middle East, focusing on Gaza. The book, which is already under preparation and research. In December 2024, Losekann released his last book: TALK NEWS - Manual do Jornalismo falado ou pitacos para se comunicar mais e melhor nas velhas e novas mídias: TV, Rádio, Internet e o que mais vier por aí...

== Personal life ==
Marcos Losekann is father of Helena Tostes Losekann (11/06/2007) and Mariana Tostes Losekann (18/01/2009). His wife is Fernanda de Oliveira Sampaio, from Belo Horizonte, Minas Gerais, Brazil.
