= Carlos Bandeirense Mirandópolis hoax =

Portuguese Wikipedia hoax article

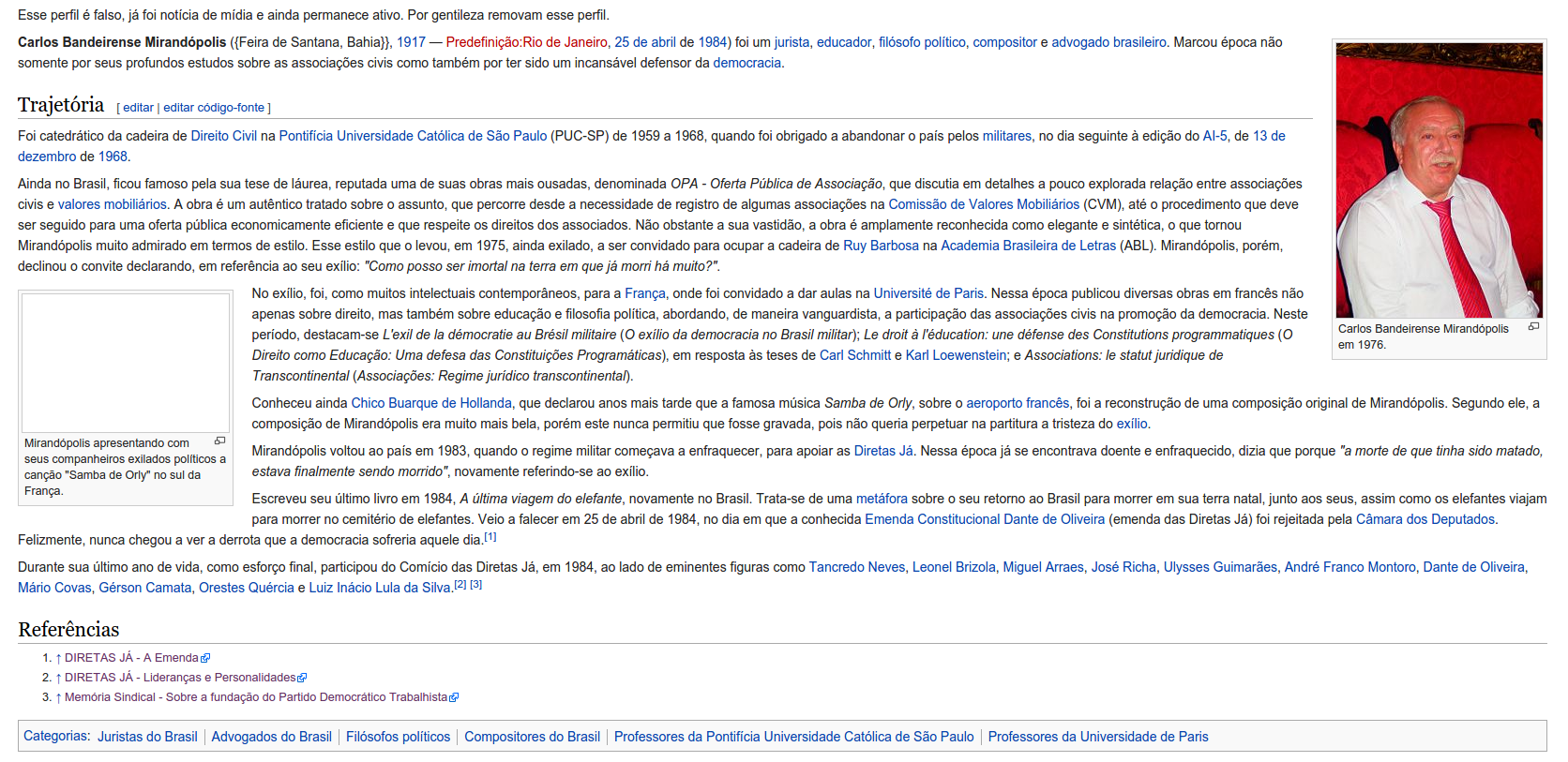
Screenshot of the article

The Carlos Bandeirense Mirandópolis (Note: Portuguese pronunciation: [ˈkaʁlus bɐ̃dejˈɾẽj̃si miɾɐ̃ˈdɔpolis].) hoax involved a false article created on the Portuguese Wikipedia. The "Carlos Bandeirense Mirandópolis" page was created in 2010 by two Brazilian lawyers who wanted to prank an intern. The article claimed that Mirandópolis—who never existed—was a Brazilian jurist and law professor who had met the composer Chico Buarque while in exile in Paris and participated in the Diretas Já movement. Mirandópolis was later cited in a decision by the Rio de Janeiro Court of Justice (TJ-RJ), in a documentary about Diretas Já, and in an undergraduate thesis. The page was deleted in 2016 after a report on the hoax was published on the G1 news portal and aired on the GloboNews television channel. Professors cited the case as a reason to be cautious with information found on the Internet.

== Article ==
The "Carlos Bandeirense Mirandópolis" page was created on the Portuguese Wikipedia on August 16, 2010, by two Brazilian lawyers, Victor Nóbrega Luccas and Daniel Tavela Luís. Realizing that it was common for interns to take information from the Internet without verification, they created the article to prank one of them. They asked the intern to research the "Public Association Offer" legal theory, which does not exist; to give more credibility to the false theory, they created a page for Mirandópolis, identifying him as its author.

According to the article, Mirandópolis (1917 – 1984) was a jurist and professor at the Faculty of Law of the Pontifical Catholic University of São Paulo (PUC-SP). He would have been persecuted during the Brazilian military dictatorship and exiled in Paris; there he would have met the Brazilian composer Chico Buarque and inspired his composition "Samba de Orly". The article also said that Mirandópolis later returned to Brazil and participated in the Diretas Já pro-democracy movement. The article included a photo of the then-mayor of Vienna, Michael Häupl, saying that it was a photo of Mirandópolis.

During the article's existence, Mirandópolis was cited in the vote of a judge in a decision by the Rio de Janeiro Court of Justice (TJ-RJ), in the documentary Diretas Já, and in an undergraduate thesis.

== Revelation of the hoax ==
The hoax was revealed on February 23, 2016, through a report that was published on G1 and aired on the GloboNews television channel. They contacted PUC-SP, which said they never had a professor with that name, and Chico Buarque's team, which said Buarque did not know Mirandópolis. Additionally, the report contacted TJ-RJ, which said that the mention made by the judge had sources from the memory center page of the Pontifical Catholic University of Rio de Janeiro (PUC-RJ) and the Diretas Já film. However, PUC-RJ said that the information was not on their website. The G1 report was also covered in the Migalhas newspaper. Victor Nóbrega said he was surprised by Mirandópolis's other mentions: "The thing took on a proportion that we never imagined. I expected it to appear on some blogs, but not in a more serious source. I laughed out loud. But, while it's funny on one hand, it's sad on the other because people are not using the Internet correctly."

In its original article, G1 interviewed professors to comment on the case, who generally said that caution was necessary with information found on the Internet. On the same day the report was published, the article was deleted by administrator Leon Saudanha. On February 24, G1 published comments from Saudanha and the Wikimedia Foundation, which manages Wikipedia, about the case. In 2017, the case was mentioned in a doctoral thesis as an example of legal fake news and by professors from Mackenzie Presbyterian University in São Paulo on their website, urging "caution with research sources". Lawyer João Taborda da Gama, writing for Diário de Notícias on the topic "Can a judge cite Wikipedia?", cited the Mirandópolis hoax as an example to support his opinion that "it depends a lot on the purpose of the citation, never being able to be the sole source of a conclusion given the mutability and reliability of Wikipedia not being absolute".

In 2023, the name "Carlos Bandeirense Mirandópolis" was used as the complainant in a Public Prosecutor's Office (MP) inquiry. When questioned, they said that "the identity of the representative is irrelevant since the MP investigates the facts and could act even on its own initiative".
