= Ruth Guimarães =

Afro-Brazilian author

- Guimarães in 2013
- Born: Ruth Guimarães Botelho; 13 June 1920; Cachoeira Paulista, São Paulo, Brazil
- Died: 21 May 2014 (aged 93); Cachoeira Paulista, São Paulo, Brazil
- Occupation: writer
- Years active: 1938–2013
- Known for: first Afro-Brazilian author with a nationwide audience
- Notable work: Água Funda (Deep Water)
- Spouse: José Botelho Netto
- Children: 9

Ruth Guimarães Botelho (June 13, 1920 – May 21, 2014) was the first Afro-Brazilian author to gain a national audience and critical attention for her novels, short stories, and poetry. A classical scholar, she translated works from French, Italian and Spanish and studied Greek and Latin, though her works reflected fables, folklore, herbal medicines and legends of Afro-Brazil. She established several cultural preservation societies, served as head of the Ministry of Culture for Municipality of Cruzeiro, São Paulo, and was a member of the São Paulo Academy of Letters.

== Biography ==
Ruth Guimarães Botelho was born on 13 June 1920 in Cachoeira Paulista, São Paulo, Brazil. From a young age she enjoyed reading and began writing her first pieces at the age of ten and submitting them to the paper O Cachoeirense. Her father had a library of classical works and her mother read romantic literature, which influenced her. When her parents died, she was quite young and she went to live with her maternal grandparents, attending school in Guará. She later attended high school in Lorena and then in 1935 attended the Escola Normal Padre Anchieta in São Paulo to earn her teaching credentials. In 1938, she entered the University of São Paulo, where she studied classical literature and philosophy. She also studied anthropology and folklore with Mário de Andrade, delving into the customs and legends of her African roots.

Guimarães continued writing during her schooling, publishing in Correio Paulistano and then she became a proofreader and translator for several publishers including Cultrix, and O Diaulas. Among the works she translated were Dostoyevsky from French, Balzac, Prosper Mérimée and Oscar Wilde, including many works from Italian and Spanish. She considered herself a Caipira who was very interested in language, having studied Greek and Latin. Though there were more lucrative employment opportunities in São Paulo, Guimarães preferred to return to the Paraíba Valley when she completed her education.

== Career ==
Returning home, Guimarães worked several jobs to help support her family, first her brothers and later her husband, José Botelho Netto, and nine children. Her first contribution to a major newspaper was a poem called "Caboclo", published when she was 19, in São Paulo. Later, she wrote a permanent column in the newspapers Folha de S. Paulo and O Estado de S. Paulo as well as writing for several years for Revista Manchete and the bimonthly Revista do Globo, of Porto Alegre. She served as head of the Department of Culture for the Municipality of Cruzeiro, São Paulo, until her retirement. Between 2010 and 2013 she also wrote a weekly column in the newspaper ValeParaibano of São José dos Campos.

In 1946, Guimarães published her first book, entitled Água funda (Deep Water), which won wide critical acclaim and propelled her to national attention. She was the first Afro-Brazilian to gain a nationwide audience, though she wrote the book in the local dialect of the Paraíba Valley on topics of everyday life including disease, misfortune and mystery. These would become signatures and recurring themes in her works, weaving the fables, folklore, herbal medicines and legends of Afro-Brazil into her works. In addition to writing her own novels, short stories and poems, she took up translating again in the 1950s, publishing works of Italian poet Sergio Corazzini in Revista do Globo and later in the 1960s did translations for Editora Cultrix. Her more than 50 books include dictionaries and encyclopedias literary works and children's stories.

Proud of her roots, she encouraged others to study their heritage, teaching and founding many organizations, like the Cachoeirense Academy of Letters, the Valdomiro Silveira Folklore Museum, and a Guarda Mirim, youth program. After having previously declined to take on another responsibility, in 2008, Guimarães accepted an election to the São Paulo Academy of Letters and worked with them on a project to reclaim Brazilian stories.

Guimarães died on 21 May 2014 in Cachoeira Paulista, Brazil and was buried in the family plot in Cruzeiro.

== Selected works ==
Guimarães has written over fifty publications, including:

- Guimarães, Ruth (1946). Água Funda (in Portuguese). Porto Alegre, Brazil: Edição da Livraria do Globo.
- Guimarães, Ruth (1950). Os filhos do mêdo (in Portuguese). Porto Alegre, Brazil: Editôra Globo.
- Guimarães, Ruth (1960). Mulheres célebres (in Portuguese). São Paulo, Brazil: Editôra Cultrix.
- Guimarães, Ruth (1960). As mães na lenda e na história (in Portuguese). São Paulo, Brazil: Editôra Cultrix.
- Guimarães, Ruth (1961). Líderes religiosos (in Portuguese). São Paulo, Brazil: Editôra Cultrix.
- Guimarães, Ruth (1968). Lendas e fábulas do Brasil (in Portuguese). São Paulo, Brazil: Editôra Cultrix.
- Guimarães, Ruth (1972). Dicionário da mitologia grega (in Portuguese). São Paulo, Brazil: Editôra Cultrix.
- Guimarães, Ruth (1975). Grandes enigmas da história (in Portuguese). São Paulo, Brazil: Editôra Cultrix.
- Guimarães, Ruth; Roque da Silva, Rolando (1986). Contos de Alphonse Daudet (in Portuguese). São Paulo, Brazil: Editôra Cultrix.
- Guimarães, Ruth (1986). Medicina mágica: as simpatias (in Portuguese). São Paulo, Brazil: Global Editora.
- Guimarães, Ruth (1991). Crônicas valeparaibanas (in Portuguese). Caçapava, Brazil: Centro de Recursos Educacionais.
- Guimarães, Ruth (1996). Contos de cidadezinha (in Portuguese). Lorena, Brazil: Centro Cultural Teresa D'Avila.
- Guimarães, Ruth (2003). Água Funda (in Portuguese). Rio de Janeiro, Brazil: Nova Fronteira.
- Guimarães, Ruth (2006). Calidoscópio: a saga de Pedro Malazarte (in Portuguese). São José dos Campos, Brazil: JAC Gráfica e Editora.

== Sources ==
- de Faria Condé, Juraci (December 2013). "Ruth Guimarães: Guarda-Chaves da Cultura Vale Paraibana". Jornal O Lince (in Portuguese) (54). Aparecida, Brazil.
- Gabriel, Sônia; Márcia, Pércila (30 December 2011). "Ruth Guimarães". Escritoras do Vale do Paraíba (in Portuguese). São José dos Campos, Brazil: Pequeno Dicionário das Escritoras do Vale do Paraíba.
- Jaffe, Noemi (21 May 2014). "Morre Ruth Guimarães, da Academia Paulista de Letras, aos 93 anos". Folha de S.Paulo (in Portuguese). São Paulo, Brazil.
- Lentz, Gleiton; Guerini, Andréia (18 October 2006). "Ruth Guimarães" (in Portuguese). Universidade Federal de Santa Catarina, Florianópolis, Brazil: Dicionario de Tradutores Literários no Brasil.
- Lourenço Barbosa, Alexandre Marcos (September 2008). "Ruth Guimarães: 29 August 2008". Jornal O Lince (in Portuguese). 2 (21). Aparecida, Brazil: 1–3.
- Nunes, Augusto (25 May 2014). "Imagens em Movimento: Ruth Guimarães Botelho, uma mestra na arte de contar histórias" (in Portuguese). São Paulo, Brazil: Editora Abril.
- Prado, Paula Maria (21 May 2014). "Escritora Ruth Guimarães morre aos 93 anos" (in Portuguese). São José dos Campos, Brazil: O Vale.
- "Morre, aos 93 anos, a escritora Ruth Guimarães" (in Portuguese). Taubaté, Brazil: Almanaque Urupês. 21 May 2014. Archived from the original on 30 November 2015.
- "Morre a escritora Ruth Guimarães". Museu Afrobrasil (in Portuguese). São Paulo, Brazil: Secretaria da Cultura. 22 May 2014.
- "Morre a escritora Ruth Guimarães". O Estado de S. Paulo (in Portuguese). São Paulo, Brazil. 21 May 2014.
