= Mazinho (disambiguation) =

Mazinho (born 1966), full name Iomar do Nascimento, is a Brazilian football manager and former football utility midfielder

Mazinho is the name of:

- Mazinho Oliveira (born 1965), full name Waldemar Aureliano de Oliveira Filho, Brazilian football forward
- Mazinho Loiola (born 1968), full name Lindomar Ferreira Loiola, Brazilian football forward
- Mazinho (footballer, born 1971), full name Pablo Joldmar José Alves, Brazilian football defender
- Mazinho (footballer, born 1987), full name Anderson Soares da Silva, Brazilian football forward
- Mazinho (footballer, born 1988), full name Osmar dos Santos Filho, Brazilian football defensive midfielder
- Mazinho (footballer, born 1989), full name José Osmar Ventura da Paz, Brazilian football midfielder
