= Cristina Ranzolin =

Brazilian journalist (born 1966)

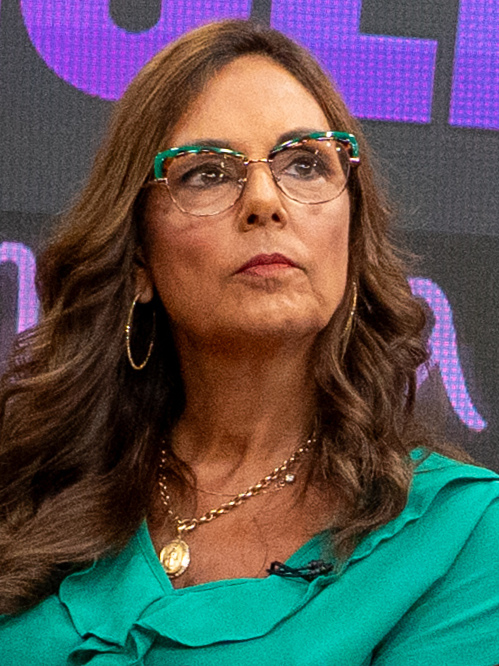
- Cristina in 2026
- Born: October 28, 1966 (age 59); Porto Alegre, Rio Grande do Sul, Brazil
- Occupations: Journalist and TV host
- Spouse: Paulo Roberto Falcão (m. 2003)
- Children: 1
- Father: Armindo Antônio Ranzolin

Cristina Borges Ranzolin Falcão, better known as Cristina Ranzolin (born October 28, 1966), is a Brazilian journalist and TV host.

== Personal life ==
Cristina is daughter of Armindo Antônio Ranzolin, great name of sports radio. She has a brother, the lawyer Ricardo Ranzolin.

== Career ==
She started her career in 1986 on RBS TV (TV Globo-affiliated broadcaster in the Brazilian state of Rio Grande do Sul) as a sports reporter, as it was the only vacancy available at the time.

In mid 1988, Cristina hosted Campo e Lavoura (from Portuguese: Field and Drop), TV program of the rural segment, that today is a segment of Galpão Crioulo, TV show about Gaucho traditions. In 1993, she moved to Rio de Janeiro, where she worked by three and a half years on TV Globo, where, alongside William Bonner, she presented Jornal Hoje between 1993 and 1996. She also presented Jornal da Globo by 15 days, substituting Fátima Bernardes, before the arrival of Lillian Witte Fibe. Ranzolin was also eventual host of RJTV, TV Globo's local newscast in Rio de Janeiro, between 1993 and 1995.

In 1996, Cristina returned to Rio Grande do Sul and to RBS TV to host Jornal do Almoço (Lunch News, in Portuguese) with also journalists Rosane Marchetti, Paulo Sant'Ana and Lasier Martins, being that after Marchetti leave in November 2010 to make reports to Globo Repórter in Rio Grande do Sul, Ranzolin began being the sole presenter of the newscast.

In July 2019, Ranzolin was chosen to host Jornal Nacional, integrating a rotation of 27 presenters of TV Globo owned-and-operated and affiliated broadcasters from all over Brazil, in a referent action at 50 years of the main newscast of the country. She opened the rotation on August 31, 2019, beside Márcio Bonfim, from TV Globo Pernambuco, TV Globo owned-and-operated station headquartered in Recife, capital of that state, in Northeast of Brazil, and in 2020, she joined to the fixed rotation of the newscast. However, due to the Coronavirus pandemic, the rotation was temporarily cancelled, and with that, TV Globo chose to select only professionals who live in Rio de Janeiro to present Jornal Nacional, a health measure that is currently in effect.

== Awards and nominations ==
Year	Award	Category	Result	Ref.
2023	Melhores do Ano NaTelinha	Best Local Presenter	Nominated	
2024	Melhores do Ano NaTelinha	Best Local Presenter	Nominated	

== Personal life ==
Since the end of 2003, Ranzolin is married to the former soccer player Paulo Roberto Falcão, with whom she has a daughter, the actress Antônia Ranzolin Falcão, born the following year (2004).
