= Elói Zorzetto =

Brazilian journalist

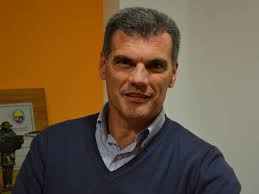
- Born: 28 May 1959 (age 67); Veranópolis, Rio Grande do Sul, Brazil
- Occupation: Journalist
- Children: 2

Elói Francisco Zorzetto, better known as Elói Zorzetto (born 28 May 1959), is a Brazilian journalist.

He is the host of RBS Notícias, a newscast aired by RBS TV (TV Globo-affiliated broadcaster in Rio Grande do Sul).

== Biography and career ==
Zorzetto graduated in journalism in 1984, having previously entered law school in 1978. In 1980 he discovered that his passion was journalism, so he opted for the course.

He started working at RBS in 1978, presenting Jornal do Almoço. In 1978, he started presenting sports in Jornal do Almoço with Celestino Valenzuela and worked on Rádio Gaúcha FM, which in 1981 became Atlântida FM (where he stayed until 1988). Since 1988, he presents RBS Notícias daily. In addition to Jornal do Almoço and RBS Noticias, Zorzetto presented Bom Dia Rio Grande and the extinct Jornal da RBS.

In addition to television, Zorzetto also worked on Rádio Gaúcha FM and AM, both from Grupo RBS.

He is married to Ana Rita Estivalet Zorzetto, with whom he has two children: Thiago and Carolina.

He was awarded the Jayme Sirotsky Award for Journalism and Entertainment, for TV reporting.
