= Márcio Bonfim =

Brazilian journalist (born 1980)

- Born: October 5, 1980 (age 45); Álvares Florence, São Paulo, Brazil
- Occupations: journalist; Television presenter
- Years active: 1999

Márcio Bonfim dos Santos, or simply Márcio Bonfim (born October 5, 1980) is a journalist and television presenter from São Paulo based in Pernambuco. Currently, he runs the NE2 news program and occasionally presents Fantástico and Jornal Nacional.

== Biography and career ==
He took a journalism course at Unifev, where he first worked at Radio Unifm and TV Unifev. He worked at TV Cultura and TVE Rio de Janeiro, as well as at TV Universitária, TV TEM Itapetininga and TV Integração Ituiutaba, where he presented the MGTV 1st Edition for Uberaba and Ituiutaba from 2001 to 2006. Since 2006, he has presented and edited the TV news program NETV on Globo Pernambuco. He became known nationally on August 31, 2019, when he co-presented with Cristina Ranzolin, from RBS TV (an affiliate of Rede Globo in Rio Grande do Sul), the first edition of the 50th anniversary of Jornal Nacional. On December 29, 2019, he became the occasional presenter of Fantástico, and in January 2020, he eventually became the presenter of Jornal Nacional. On September 22, 2020, he leaves the presentation of NE1 after 14 years and starts presenting NE2 in place of Meiry Lanunce.

== Awards and nominations ==
Year	Award	Category	Result	Ref.
2021	Melhores do Ano NaTelinha	Best Local Presenter	Nominated	
2022	Melhores do Ano NaTelinha	Best Local Presenter	Nominated	
