= Novoeste =

Novoeste may refer to:

- Novoeste (newspaper)
- Novoeste (railway company)
