= RBS TV Santa Rosa =

RBS TV Santa Rosa (ZYB 629)
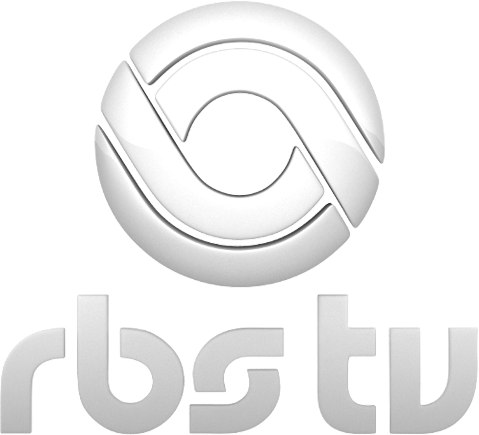
- Santa Rosa, Rio Grande do Sul; Brazil
- Channels: Digital: 34 (UHF); Virtual: 6

Programming
- Affiliations: TV Globo

Ownership
- Owner: Grupo RBS; (RBS TV Santa Rosa Ltda.)

History
- First air date: August 28, 1992
- Former channel numbers: Analog: 6 (VHF, 1992-2023)

Technical information
- Licensing authority: ANATEL
- Transmitter coordinates: 27°50′33.8″S 54°28′37.8″W

Links
- Website: redeglobo.globo.com/rs/rbstvrs

RBS TV Santa Rosa (channel 6) is a television station in Santa Rosa, Rio Grande do Sul, Brazil, affiliated with TV Globo, member of RBS TV and owned by Grupo RBS. RBS TV Santa Rosa's studios and transmitter are located on Benvenuto de Conti Street, in Alto do Parque district

== History ==
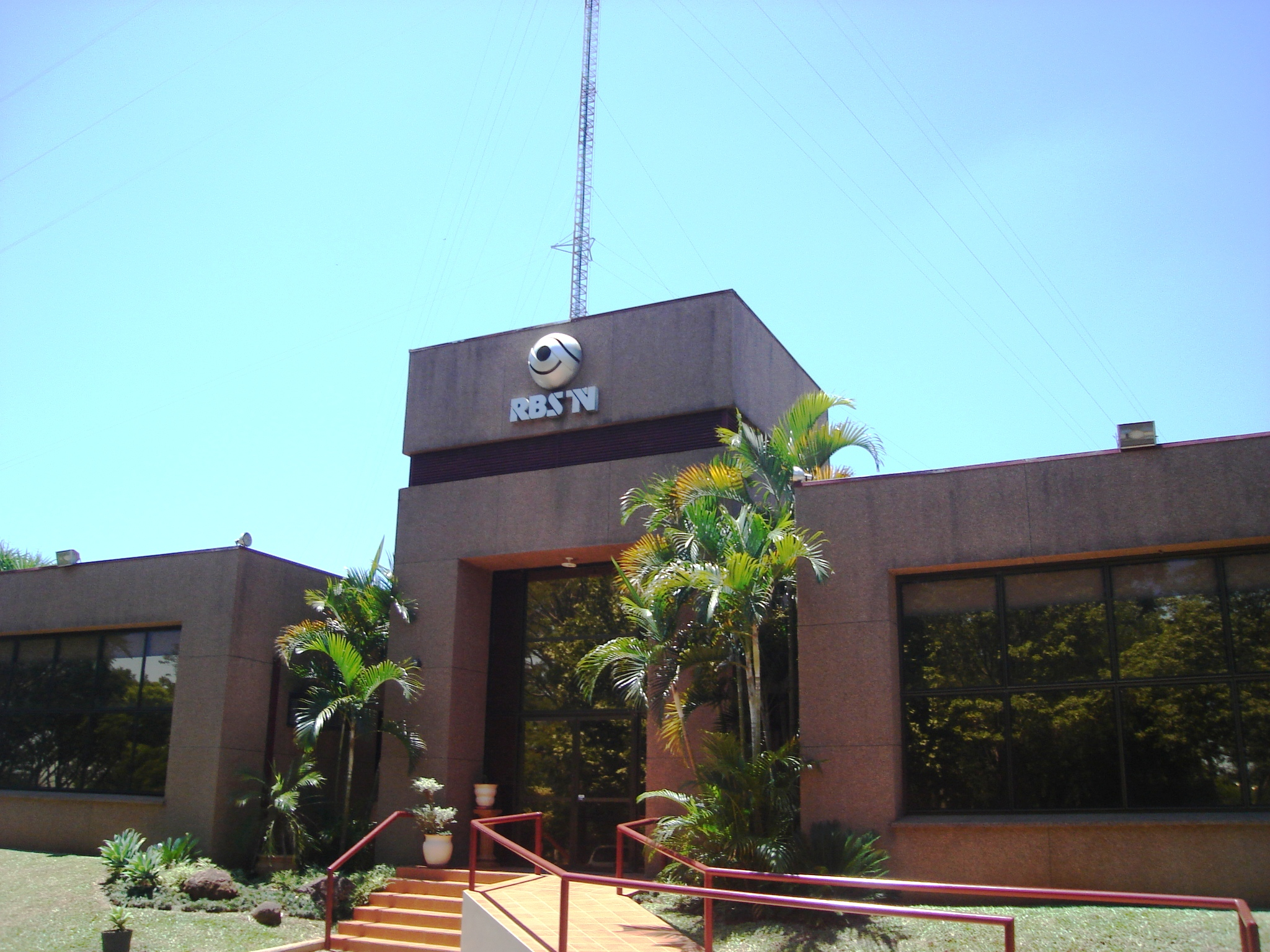
Headquarters of the TV station in 2007.

RBS TV Santa Rosa was founded on August 28, 1992, by Grupo RBS with the aim of replacing the retransmitters of RBS TV Cruz Alta in 42 municipalities in the northwest of Rio Grande do Sul. The party of inauguration of the channel 6 VHF had the presence of Xuxa Meneghel, presenter of children's programs on Globo, born in the municipality of Santa Rosa. Xuxa presented the broadcaster with a plaque in honor of the opening of the channel.

In 2005, RBS TV Santa Rosa renovated the studio where the local blocks of Jornal do Almoço and RBS Notícias are shown, adapting to Globo's standard of local journalism. The new scenario features images of regions covered by the station's signal.

In 2007, it completed 15 years and aired special programs showing the inside of the channel's headquarters during some commercial breaks, with the slogan A TV com a cara da região (The TV with the face of the region). It also aired a special report on the anniversary in the local block of Jornal do Almoço.

In August 2009, Ibope released a survey that confirmed RBS TV Santa Rosa's audience leadership. The highlight is on the local news program RBS Notícias, which recorded a share of more than 78% between April and June of the same year.

Since August 17, 2009, viewers of RBS TV Santa Rosa can follow the work of the station's professionals through their blog, on the RBS TV portal.

== Digital television ==
| Channel | Res. | Programming |
|---|---|---|
| 6.1 | 1080i | Main RBS TV Santa Rosa programming / TV Globo |

=== Transition to digital signal ===
The station was scheduled to shut down its analog signal, over VHF channel 6, on December 31, 2023, as part of the federally mandated transition from analog to digital television. However, the station shuttered its analog signal on July 3 of that year. The station's digital signal remains on its pre-transition UHF channel 34, using virtual channel 6.

== Programming ==
On August 16, 2019, the local block of Jornal do Almoço was extinguished and on August 19, the station began to relay the regional edition of the news program generated by RBS TV Passo Fundo.
