= Diário do Povo (disambiguation) =

Diário do Povo (Portuguese for People's Diary) may refer to:

- Diário do Povo (Campinas) in Campinas, Brazil
- Diário do Povo (Pato Branco) in Pato Branco, Brazil
- Diário do Povo (Teresina) in Teresina, Brazil
