= Notícia Já =

Notícia Já is a popular daily newspaper in the city of Campinas, state of São Paulo, Brazil. It was founded in 2007, and has a tabloid format.

Currently it has an audited circulation of 60,000. Its title means News Now in Portuguese language.

Notícia Já is owned and managed by a larger communications holding company, Rede Anhangüera de Comunicação (RAC), which owns the two other newspapers in Campinas, and others in the cities of Piracicaba and Ribeirão Preto, such as Correio Popular, Diário do Povo and Gazeta do Cambuí.

Notícia Já, as the other RAC's newspapers are available on-line though a Web portal called Cosmo.
