= Maurício Sirotsky Sobrinho =

Brazilian businessman and journalist (1925–1986)

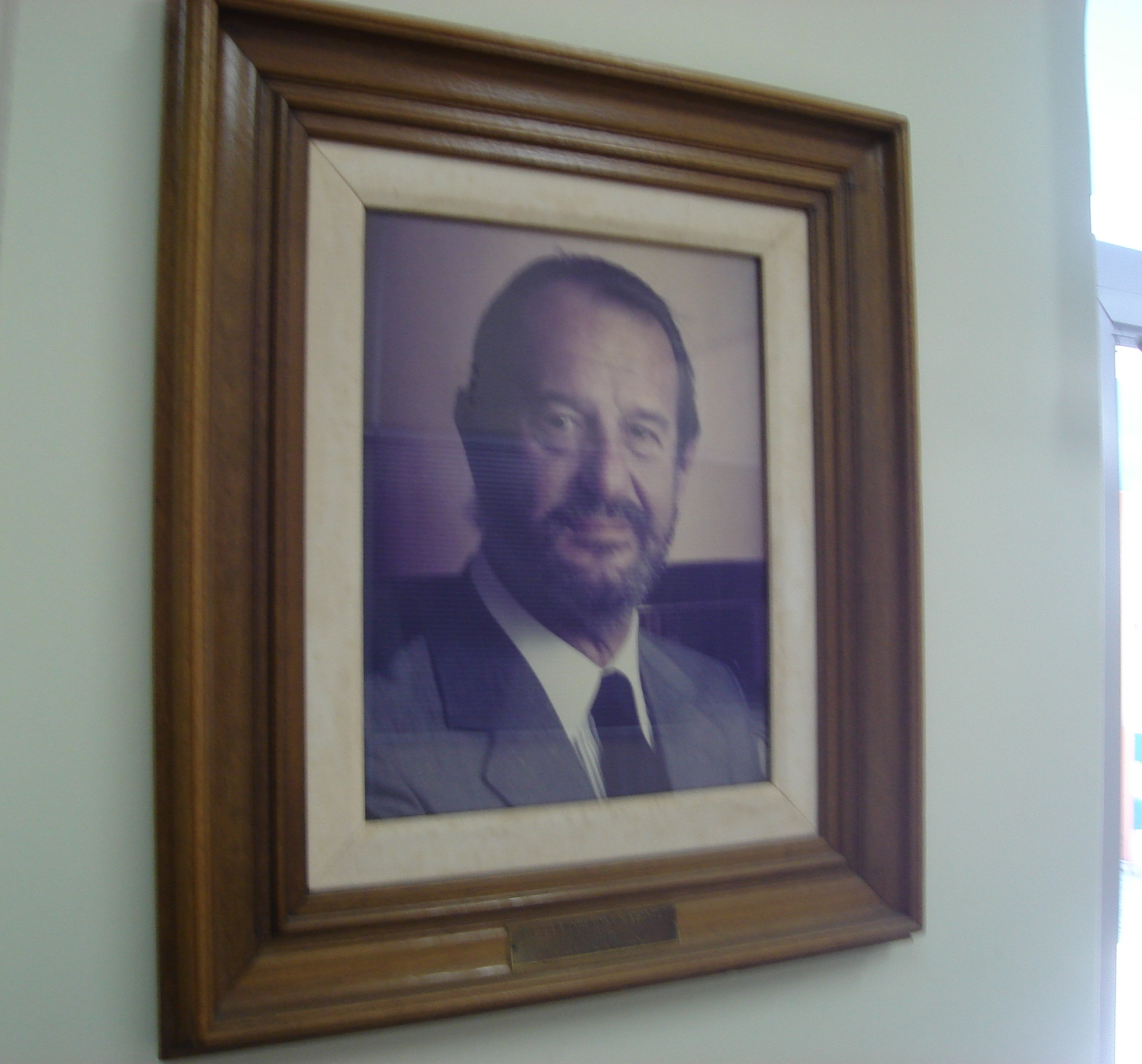
- Maurício's photo on the headquarters of RBS TV Pelotas
- Born: June 5, 1925; Erebango, Rio Grande do Sul, Brazil
- Died: March 24, 1986 (aged 60); Porto Alegre, Rio Grande do Sul, Brazil
- Occupations: Businessman and journalist
- Children: 4

Maurício Sirotsky Sobrinho (June 5, 1925 – March 24, 1986) was a Brazilian businessman and journalist.

Founder of Grupo RBS (Rede Brasil Sul), Maurício was succeeded as president of the company by his younger brother, Jayme Sirotsky, in 1986; in 1991, the command of the company passed to Maurício's son, Nelson Pacheco Sirotsky; and, in 2012, grandson Eduardo Sirotsky Melzer became the new president of Grupo RBS.

== Biography ==
In 1957, a company led by Maurício acquired Rádio Gaúcha. Five years later, in 1962, he created TV Gaúcha, a former affiliate of TV Excelsior, with Frederico Arnaldo Ballvé and Nestor Rizzo in Rio Grande do Sul.

Later, in 1965, before the extinction of TV Excelsior, the company became affiliated with TV Globo, giving rise to what today constitutes RBS TV – at this time, RBS, as well as Globo, supported the military dictatorship in Brazil, episode for which RBS recanted with an editorial in 2014.

In 1967, he created TV Caxias, forming the first regional TV network in Brazil, and also Rádio Atlântida, the first youth radio station in Brazil, in honor of Jovem Guarda and Atlântida-Sul beach, on the north coast of Rio Grande do Sul.

In 1964, Ary de Carvalho, from the extinct Rio Grande do Sul branch of the newspaper Última Hora, created and modernized the journal Zero Hora, with the construction of the current building on Avenida Ipiranga, inaugurated in May 1969, together with the acquisition of a new printer. color offset. The investment was so high that Ary de Carvalho entered a financial crisis. Thus, in 1970 Maurício Sirotsky Sobrinho bought the shareholding control of the Zero Hora newspaper from Carvalho, becoming the new owner of the newspaper company.

The Doctor Maurício, as he was known, died on March 24, 1986, due to cardiac arrest.

== Associations ==
- Director of the Brazilian Association of Radio and Television Broadcasters (Abert), from 1968 to 1972;
- Founder and member of the advisory board of the Brazilian Association of Television Companies (Abrate), in 1970;
- Director of the Rio Grande do Sul Association of Radio and Television Stations (Agert), from 1966 to 1968;
- Founder and first vice-president of the Brazilian Association of Newspapers (Abrajor);
- President of the Union of Newspaper and Magazine Owners of Rio Grande do Sul;
- Member of the Deliberative Council of the Rio Grande Press Association (ARI).
