= Eduardo Sirotsky Melzer =

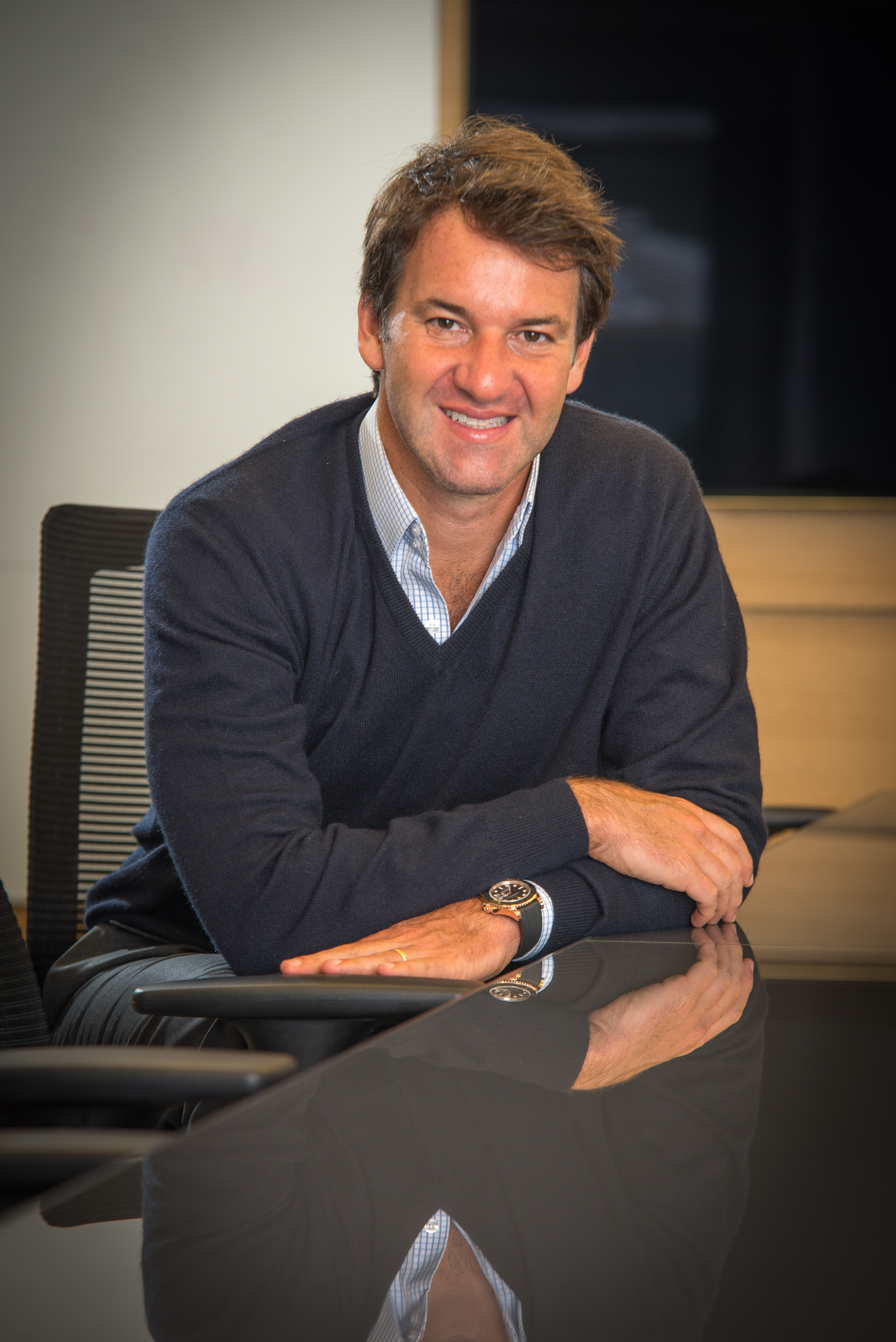
- Born: May 13, 1972 (age 54); Porto Alegre, Rio Grande do Sul, Brazil
- Occupation: CEO of EB Capital
- Relatives: Maurício Sirotsky Sobrinho (grandfather)

Eduardo Sirotsky Melzer is a Brazilian businessman and Chief Executive Officer of EB Capital, a Brazilian private equity firm focused on investing in companies that address structural gaps in the Brazilian economy.

He was chairman and president of Grupo RBS and owner of the business conglomerate RBS, one of the largest multimedia communications companies in Brazil. Eduardo was also chairman of e.Bricks Digital and shareholder of e.Bricks Ventures, a venture capital and private equity company with operations in Brazil and abroad.

== Education and career ==
In 1998, Melzer graduated with a degree in Business Administration from the Pontifical Catholic University of Rio Grande do Sul (PUCRS), and in 2002, completed an MBA from Harvard University.

He began his career in Brazil in the financial and franchising markets, reaching the master franchiser office at the multinational Sweet Sweet Way, and also participated in projects for consulting firm Booz Allen & Hamilton.

In the United States, he was a senior analyst at Delphi Corporation and CEO of Box Top Media, a media company located in New York.

In 2008, Melzer attended the Effective Strategies for Media Companies and the Building and Leading Customer Centric Organizations at Harvard Business School.

Melzer was member of the Board of Ethics of the National Council for Advertising Self-Regulation (Conar), and the Executive Council of the Standard Norms (CENP), in 2009.

== EB Capital ==
EB Capital is a Brazilian Private Equity firm focused on investing in companies that address Brazilian structural gaps.

The company states "We believe that Private Equity should be driven by execution excellence. Our partners have a strong history of operational expertise, sector knowledge and a worldwide network constructed on long term relationships".

=== Grupo RBS ===
Eduardo Melzer joined Grupo RBS in 2004 as CEO for the domestic market, became vice-president of market and business development in 2008, and executive vice-president of Grupo RBS in 2010. Melzer is the grandson of the company founder, Maurício Sirotsky Sobrinho.

Two years later, in 2012, Melzer became executive chairman of Grupo RBS, a position in which he succeeded his uncle Nelson Pacheco Sirotsky.

Eduardo Sirotsky Melzer assumed the role of CEO of Grupo RBS on July 3, 2012 in a ceremony held in Porto Alegre.

His office was announced in May 2012 as part of a planned succession process. In 2016, he also began acting as chairman of the board of directors.

== Recognition ==
In 2006, he received the Caboré Award in the Professional Vehicle category.

He was the 2009 Professional highlight of the Brazilian Advertising Association (ABP) in the Executive Vehicle category.

Two years later, he received the 2011 Coletiva.Net Award in the Marketing Management/Communication/Communication Group category.

In 2015, he received the Merit Award in Administration from the Regional Management Council of Rio Grande do Sul (CRA-RS).

Also in 2015, he was chosen to be part of the list of leaders at Cambridge Institute for Family Enterprise. This list brings together 25 individuals on an annual basis who are taking on leading roles in family enterprises and who are considered good examples for society.
