= Américo de Campos (lawyer) =

Brazilian journalist

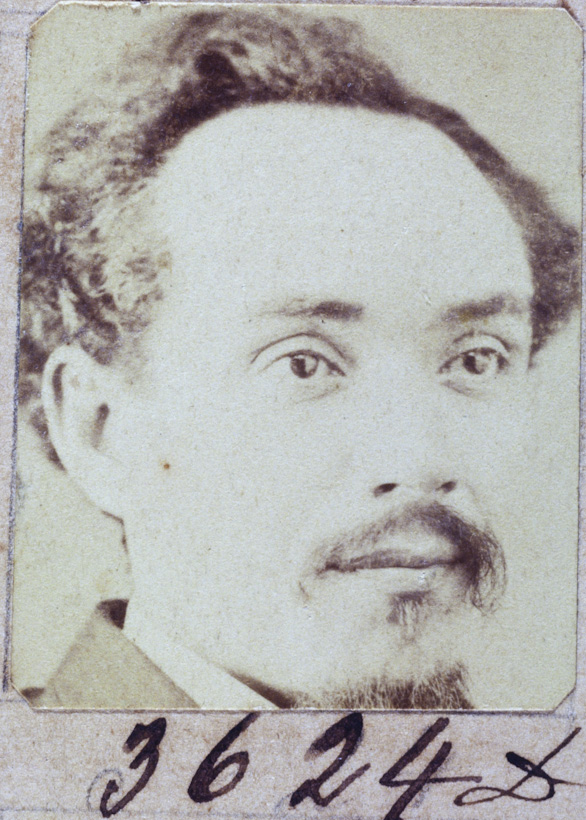
- Born: August 12, 1838; Bragança Paulista, São Paulo, Empire of Brazil
- Died: January 20, 1900 (aged 61); Naples, Campania, Kingdom of Italy
- Education: Faculty of Law of São Paulo

Américo Brasílio de Campos (August 12, 1838 – January 20, 1900) was a Brazilian lawyer, playwright, journalist, politician, and diplomat. A republican and abolitionist activist, he was one of the founders of the newspaper O Estado de S. Paulo.

== Biography ==
Born in Bragança Paulista, Campos graduated from the Faculty of Law of São Paulo in 1860, becoming a public prosecutor. From 1865 to 1874, he worked in the newspaper Correio Paulistano, eventually assuming its direction. In 1875, along with Rangel Pestana and José Maria Lisboa, he founded the newspaper A Província de S. Paulo, now known as O Estado de S. Paulo. Dissatisfied with the policy imposed on the newspaper by its director, Campos and his friend Lisboa founded the Diário de S. Paulo.

Campos was present at the Convention of Itu, from which the Paulista Republican Party emerged. Following the Proclamation of the Republic, Campos was appointed a consul in Naples, where he died.

The district of Américo de Campos was named after Campos and created by decree as part of Tanabi in 1926, then elevated to the status of municipality in 1948.
