= Rede Anhanguera de Comunicação =

- Industry: Mass Media
- Headquarters: Campinas, São Paulo, Brazil
- Website: RAC Home Page

Rede Anhanguera de Comunicação (Anhanguera Communication Network) is an important private holding company of mass media in the São Paulo state. It is headquartered in Campinas, São Paulo, Brazil.

The company has the following assets:

- Newspapers:
  - Correio Popular, Campinas
  - Diário do Povo, Campínas
  - Notícia Já, Campinas
  - Gazeta do Cambuí, Campinas
  - Gazeta de Ribeirão Preto, Ribeirão Preto
  - Gazeta de Piracicaba, Piracicaba
- Magazines:
  - Metrópole, Campinas
- Datacorp, a polling and research company
- Grafcorp, a printing office
- Agência Anhanguera de Notícias, a news agency
- Websites:
  - Cosmo On-Line

RAC's CEO and main shareholder is Silvino de Godoy Neto.
