= Mazinho (footballer, born 1971) =

Brazilian footballer (1971–2023)

Personal information
- Full name: Pablo Joldmar José Alves
- Date of birth: 12 August 1971
- Place of birth: Américo de Campos, Brazil
- Date of death: 29 September 2023 (aged 52)
- Place of death: Américo de Campos, Brazil
- Position: Defender

Youth career
- 1986–1990: São Paulo

Senior career*
Years	Team	Apps	(Gls)
1990	São Paulo	10	(0)
- * Club domestic league appearances and goals

Pablo Joldmar José Alves (12 August 1971 – 29 September 2023), better known as Mazinho, was a Brazilian professional footballer who played as a defender.

== Career ==
Formed in the São Paulo youth categories, he played just 10 professional games for the club in 1990. He had to end his career after losing the use of his legs in a car accident, occurred 16 June 1990, in the city of São Carlos.

== Death ==
Mazinho died in his hometown Américo de Campos, 29 September 2023.
