= O Jornal =

Brazilian newspaper

O Jornal was a Brazilian newspaper published in Rio de Janeiro, Brazil. It was founded in 1919, and ceased publications in 1974.
