= Diário Catarinense =

Brazilian tabloid-format newspaper

- Format: magazine
- Publisher: NSC Communication
- President: Mario Neves
- Editor: César Seabra
- Language: Portuguese
- Country: Brazil

Diário Catarinense (English: Santa Catarina Daily) is a Brazilian tabloid-format newspaper, published in Florianópolis, the capital of the state of Santa Catarina. Founded on 5 May 1986, it is the most important newspaper in Santa Catarina state. It was owned by Grupo RBS until 2016, when the paper was sold to NSC Comunicação.

The last daily edition of the paper was on October 25, 2019. As of October 26, 2019, the publication became weekly. The Diário Catarinense ceases to have daily circulation, starting to circulate only on weekends in magazine format. With that, it starts to concentrate its content in digital media through the NSC Total portal.

== See also ==
- List of newspapers in Brazil
