= Zero Hora =

Brazilian newspaper

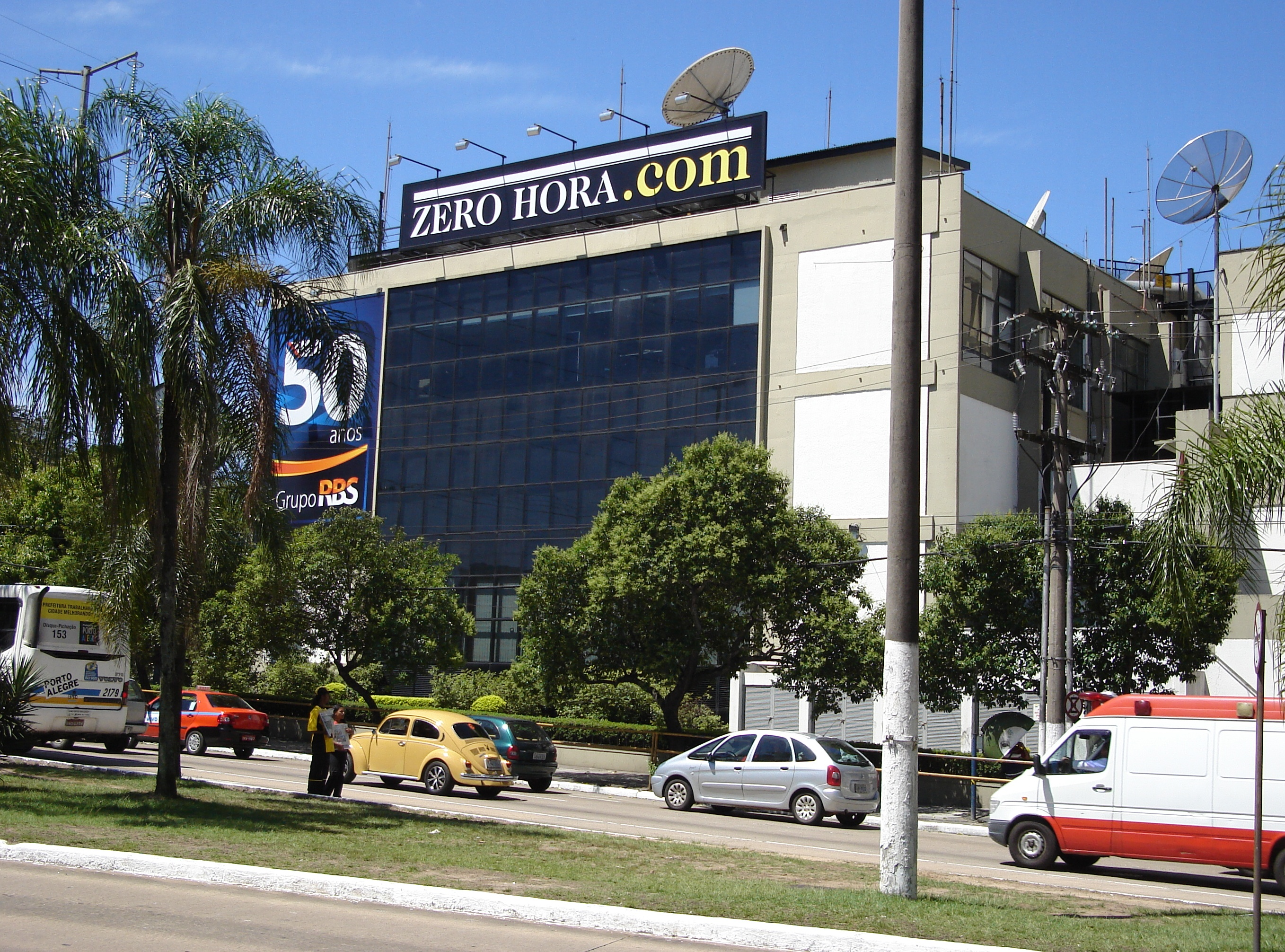
- Type: Daily newspaper
- Format: Broadsheet
- Owner: Grupo RBS
- Editor: Marta Gleich
- Founded: 1964
- Headquarters: Avenida Ipiranga, 1075; Porto Alegre, Brazil
- Circulation: 201,178 (as of 2015)
- Website: www.zerohora.com

Zero Hora is a Brazilian newspaper based in the city of Porto Alegre, the sixth biggest of the country. It is edited by Grupo RBS.

== Inquiry on Grupo RBS oligopoly / monopoly practicing ==
The RBS Group is being investigated by the practice of oligopoly / monopoly. In 2008, the Federal Prosecutor of Santa Catarina has filed a public civil action (Case No. 2008.72.00.014043-5) against the company oligopoly Rede Brasil Sul (RBS) in southern Brazil. The MPF requires the company, among other measures, to reducing its number of TV and radion stations in the states of Santa Catarina and Rio Grande do Sul, so that to be in according to the Brazilian law; and the cancellation of the purchase of the newspaper A Notícia from Joinville, consummated in 2006 - which resulted in a virtual monopoly over the relevant newspapers in the state of Santa Catarina.

In 2009, the Federal Prosecutor in Canoas (RS), Pedro Antonio Roso, asked the chairman of the RBS Group, Nelson Pacheco Sirotsky, among other informations, the number of TV and radio stations that the company owns in Rio Grande do Sul, "as well as its affiliates, stations and repeaters." The request is part of an administrative proceeding brought by federal prosecutors "to determine possible occurrence of monopolistic practices and irregularities in granting Radio and Television to the RBS Group in Rio Grande do Sul".

== Awards ==
=== ExxonMobil Journalism Award (Esso) ===
- 1995: Esso Regional Sul, awarded to Carlos Wagner, for entitled "O BRASIL DE BOMBACHAS"
- 1997: Esso Regional Sul, awarded to Eduardo Veras and Itamar Melo, for "NO LIMIAR DA CIVILIZAÇÃO"
- 1998: Esso Regional Sul, awarded to Carlos Wagner, Humberto Trezzi and Nilson Mariano, for "A FRONTEIRA DO CRIME"
- 1999: Esso Regional Sul, awarded to Eliane Brum, for "A VIDA QUE NINGUÉM VÊ"
- 2003: Esso Regional Sul, awarded to Carlos Wagner, for "Uma Viagem ao País Bandido"
- 2005: Esso Regional Sul, awarded to Renato Bertuol Barros, Júlio Cordeiro and Equipe, for "Paixão pelo Futebol"
- 2006: Esso Regional 2, awarded to Carlos Etchichury and Nilson Mariano, for "O Novo Retrato do Pampa"

=== Vladimir Herzog Award ===
- 2013: Vladimir Herzog Award for Photography, awarded to Jefferson Botega for "Depósito Humano".

== See also ==
- List of newspapers in Brazil
- History of the press in Rio Grande do Sul
