= Diário de S. Paulo =

Brazilian newspaper

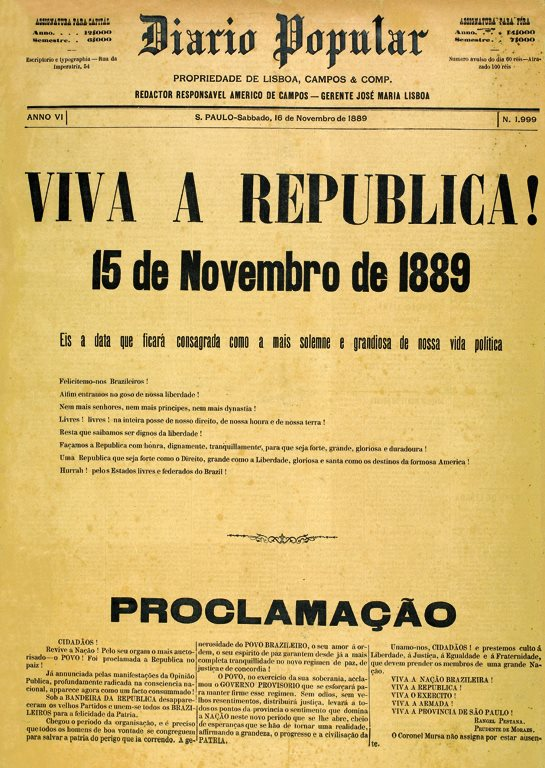
- Cover of the Diário on the Proclamation of the Republic.
- Type: Daily newspaper
- Founder(s): José Maria Lisboa; Américo Brasílio de Campos
- President: Patrícia Solimeni
- Founded: November 8, 1884
- Headquarters: São Paulo, São Paulo, Brazil
- Website: spdiario.com.br

Diário de S. Paulo is a Brazilian newspaper published in the city of São Paulo. It was founded in 1884 and called Diário Popular until 2001.

== History ==
After founding and working as director and editor of Correio Paulistano for almost twenty years, Américo Brasílio de Campos joined his colleagues José Maria Lisboa and Rangel Pestana to found A Província de S. Paulo in 1875. In 1884, Campos and Lisboa were fired by the new partner of A Província, João Alberto Salles, after protesting against the new editorial policy imposed by him, which was anti-Lusitanian. At the end of 1884, Campos and Lisboa founded the Diário Popular with the financial support of Antônio Bento, an abolitionist and owner of the Jornal do Commercio de São Paulo, Hipólito Junior and Aristides Lobo. The name was inspired by the Portuguese newspaper of the same name. In the first issue, the founders announced their editorial line:

[...] We don't have a schedule; compromises that can fail are worth nothing, and besides, the ideas of the founders of the Diário Popular are well known and their individualities are well worth a schedule. The long practice of men and things has taught us the precise independence and moderation that will be the norm in the discussions we engage in. All fair complaints made by competent people will be addressed and publicized. We will openly publish scientific, literary and political articles of recognized merit. The editorial section will be open to all opinions, requiring, as usual, the responsibility of the author and morality in the writings. We will not accept "straw men".

The newspaper's first headquarters, located on Imperatriz Street, hosted several meetings between politicians at the end of the 19th century, who debated abolitionist and republican ideas. Originally an evening paper (the first in São Paulo), it was characterized by being a newspaper of advertisements for small businesses. The advertising desk used to be crowded with people writing their own ads. It had a reasonable circulation and a solid financial situation. Given its "popular" nature, it used to receive and mediate donations for the poor and participated in several charity campaigns.

After the Proclamation of the Republic of Brazil, which it supported, Diário Popular gained great popularity. Aristides Lobo was appointed Minister of the Interior in the provisional government, Américo de Campos was appointed Brazilian consul to the Kingdom of Italy and José Maria Lisboa was elected state representative for São Paulo. While Lobo and Campos left the newspaper to pursue political careers, Lisboa resigned and became the sole owner of Diário Popular.

=== Paranapanema River Campaign ===
In 1977, Diário Popular began a campaign against the installation of the Braskraft paper mill in Angatuba, on the banks of the Paranapanema River, given the high risk of pollution of the river by the project. Led by editorial secretary Edgard Barros and reporter Ane do Valle, the campaign sparked a reaction from other newspapers and the authorities, who went from defending the project to criticizing it. A CPI was opened by the São Paulo Legislative Assembly and Braskraft gave up on the project and settled in Paraná. Currently, the Paranapanema is one of the cleanest rivers in Brazil.

=== Acquisition by Orestes Quércia ===
In the 1980s, Diário Popular went up for sale. By 1987, the financial situation was critical. At the same time, the São Paulo State Government began to invest more in advertising in the newspaper. In October 1987, a report in O Estado de S. Paulo indicated that the Diário received 11.1% of the São Paulo government's advertising spending that year.

In May 1988, Rodrigo Lisboa Soares, great-grandson of José Maria Lisboa, announced the sale of the Diário to Ary Carvalho, owner of the newspaper O Dia, for Cz$244 million. However, there were rumors that the real buyer was Orestes Quércia, the governor of São Paulo, who denied the purchase until he left public office in March 1991, when he announced that he had acquired a 30% stake in the newspaper. In the 2000s, Quércia revealed that he had bought the Diário Popular in 1988 in partnership with Carvalho. Between 1995 and 1998, Quércia's group invested R$35 million in a new printing system for the newspaper.

=== Infoglobo and final years ===
In 2001, Diário Popular was acquired by Infoglobo, which also owns the newspapers O Globo and Extra. The group wanted a newspaper in the São Paulo region and changed the title to Diário de S. Paulo, the same name as the newspapers launched in 1865 and 1929 by Assis Chateaubriand and owned by Diários Associados. Infoglobo presented an editorial line less popular and police-oriented for the newspaper. On October 15, 2009, businessman José Hawilla, owner of the Bom Dia newspaper chain, sports marketing company Traffic and TV TEM, acquired the newspaper, as well as the printing facilities located in Osasco. On September 2, 2013, Traffic sold control of the newspaper to the Cereja Comunicação Digital group. After going through financial and administrative problems with the new management, Diário de S. Paulo was declared bankrupt by the 2nd Bankruptcy Court of São Paulo on January 23, 2018, with both the print version and the online portal ceasing to circulate.

=== Current owner ===
In October 2019, businessman Kléber Moreira announced the purchase of the newspaper from Cereja Comunicação Digital group for R$30,000 and reactivated the online and print versions. Despite the announcement, the editions were produced by plagiarizing articles from other outlets. There is no data on its print circulation at the Instituto Verificador de Comunicação.

== Awards ==
- ExxonMobil Journalism Award – Esso Photography Award (1987) to Luiz Luppi for "Residência ou Morte".

== See also ==
- Estadão
- Folha de S.Paulo
- Brazilian press
