= ValeParaibano =

ValeParaibano is a daily newspaper in the Brazilian city of São José dos Campos. It was founded on January 2, 1952. Its editions are focused on news and events in Vale do Paraiba, a region of São Paulo State.

The name "ValeParaibano" denotes the origin of the newspaper, from the Vale do Paraiba. The reported circulation data were around 20,000 readers on weekdays and 30,000 on Sundays in 2002.
