= Migalhas =

Online law newspaper in Brazil

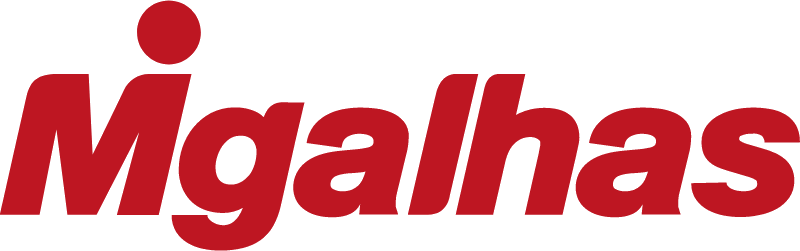
- Format: Legal news portal
- Founded: 13 November 2000
- Language: Portuguese
- Country: Brazil
- ISSN: 1983-392X
- Website: www.migalhas.com.br

Migalhas is a Brazilian online newspaper created on 13 November 2000, specializing in legal, political, and economic news and articles for legal professionals. The website promotes services for freelance lawyers (correspondents), holds legal events, and publishes books through Editora Migalhas.

== History ==
Migalhas was founded on 13 November 2000 by lawyer, journalist and writer Miguel Matos, currently CEO of the company as of 2026, who sent emails with the news he considered most relevant to some friends. Later, this curation of articles turned into a newsletter and, on September 2002, the Migalhas website emerged.

In addition to its news portal, which reaches approximately 1.5 million people daily, and its newsletter, which reaches 650,000 registered readers, in July 2005 Migalhas created a correspondent service, a database connecting professionals who provide legal services with other lawyers and companies that cannot be physically present to carry out legal proceedings. In August of the same year, it also created a web TV channel, TV Migalhas, for the production of audiovisual content, and Editora Migalhas, which has published more than 160 books.

=== Editora Migalhas ===
Editora Migalhas is a publishing house that compiles anthologies of Brazilian writers and lawyers, publishes new titles authored by jurists and lawyers, history books, and also technical law books. In total, more than 160 different titles have already been printed. One of them, Migalhas de Ruy Barbosa, for example, had excerpts used in the preamble to the impeachment request against former President Dilma Rousseff. A book by Supreme Court Justice Luís Roberto Barroso, on the 30th anniversary of the Brazilian Constitution, which is the most recent book published by the publishing house as of 2018, was also published by Editora Migalhas.

== Recognition ==
Currently, the Migalhas portal is a source of legal news for the Agência Estado Political Broadcast, as well as being a reference for legal professionals and a legal source for media outlets such as O Estado de S. Paulo, Folha de S.Paulo, UOL and CNN Brasil. Official bodies, law firms and judicial authorities frequently reference Migalhas on their respective websites and pages.
