= Correio Popular =

Daily newspaper in Campinas, São Paulo, Brazil

Coordinates: 22°54′53.03″S 47°03′37.19″W

Correio Popular is the largest daily newspaper in the city of Campinas, state of São Paulo, Brazil. It was founded on September 4, 1927, by Álvaro Ribeiro. The founder proposed a motto for the newspaper, which reads: "We will be diligent inspectors of public administration as well as obstinate caretakers of collective rights."

Currently it has an audited circulation of 48,000 (66,000 on Sundays) and a market share of 76% of all newspaper readership in Campinas (which is the third city in the Brazilian ranking of absolute number of newspaper readers) . It is one of the most modern newspapers in the country and the largest Brazilian newspaper published outside capital cities. The publication is distributed to 45 cities in the region of Campinas. Currently it has special weekly supplements on travel and automobiles, and another one for children. On Sundays the paper has supplements for jobs and home and construction.

Correio Popular is owned and managed by a larger communications holding company, Rede Anhangüera de Comunicação (RAC), which operates a news agency (AAN), a printing facility (Grafcorp), a polls company (Datacorp) and owns also several other newspapers in Campinas, Piracicaba and Ribeirão Preto, such as Diário do Povo (the second largest newspaper in Campinas, with a 20% market share), Gazeta do Cambuí, Gazeta de Piracicaba, Gazeta de Ribeirão and the Metrópole magazine, which circulates on Sundays with Correio Popular.

Correio Popular, as the other RAC's newspapers are available on-line though a Web portal called Cosmo.
