= Diário do Povo =

Newspaper published in Campinas, Brazil

Coordinates: 22°54′53.03″S 47°03′37.19″W

Diário do Povo (Portuguese for People's Diary) is a newspaper published in the city of Campinas, state of São Paulo, Brazil.

Correio Popular is owned and managed by a larger communications holding company, Rede Anhangüera de Comunicação, which operates a news agency (AAN), a printing facility (Grafcorp), a polls company (Datacorp) and owns also several other newspapers in Campinas, Piracicaba and Ribeirão Preto, such as Correio Popular (the largest newspaper in Campinas, with a 65% market share), Gazeta do Cambuí, Gazeta de Piracicaba, Gazeta de Ribeirão and the Metrópole magazine, which circulates on Sundays with Correio Popular.

Diário do Povo, as the other RAC's newspapers are available on-line though a Web portal called Cosmo.

== History ==
Founded in January 1912, Diário do Povo was established through a partnership between journalists Antônio Franco Cardoso ("Cardosinho", as he was known) and Álvaro Ribeiro. The newspaper was created following the closure of Comércio de Campinas, another Campinas-based newspaper that operated from September 1900 until the end of the following decade, where Ribeiro had worked as an editor and Cardoso as head of the printing workshops.

In 1924, twelve years after the newspaper’s founding, Álvaro Ribeiro left the publication due to disagreements with his business partner. Cardoso subsequently assumed full control of the newspaper and directed it for five decades until his death in 1959.

The following year, the Cardoso family sought to resolve financial difficulties while also facing challenges in managing the newspaper, hoping to restore Diário do Povo to its former success. With that goal in mind, the family sold 50% of the company’s share capital to José Augusto Roxo Moreira, a young heir from the textile industry who had long aspired to enter the newspaper business.

Determined to revive the newspaper, Roxo Moreira initiated a series of modernization measures, introducing technological equipment such as telex, teletypes, and wirephotos supplied by United Press International.

The innovations introduced by Roxo Moreira enabled Diário do Povo to regain prestige among readers in Campinas, establishing the newspaper as a major competitor to the already established Correio Popular, founded by Álvaro Ribeiro in 1927, shortly after his return from exile in Portugal. Ribeiro had fled Brazil in 1924 after becoming a target of the federal government under President Artur Bernardes due to his support for the Paulista Revolt of 1924, an uprising that began in the city of São Paulo in July of that year, later spreading into the countryside and inspiring revolts in other Brazilian states before being definitively defeated in September 1924.

Although the results of Roxo Moreira’s modernization efforts were initially very positive, they did not last long. By the beginning of the 1980s, the newspaper was once again facing a financial crisis.

At the same time, a third daily newspaper emerged in Campinas: Jornal de Hoje (JH), owned by São Paulo politician Orestes Quércia. Upon learning of the financial difficulties faced by Diário do Povo, Quércia acquired 46% of the company’s share capital from the Roxo Moreira family. The acquisition was followed by the closure of Jornal de Hoje, whose printing facilities were subsequently used to print the former competitor. The remaining share capital of Diário do Povo was gradually sold to Quércia until, in 1984, the newspaper was fully transferred to the politician, who at the time was Vice Governor of the State of São Paulo.

In 1996, ''Diário do Povo'' was sold again, this time to the Godoy family, owners of the daily newspaper ''Correio Popular'', which had already become the largest newspaper in the city of Campinas and the surrounding region.

At the time, in addition to Correio Popular, several other companies formed the “Grupo Correio”: CorreioNet (a news portal and internet service provider that later became “Cosmo On Line”, and subsequently “Correio.com”), Grafcorp (a printing unit), Datacorp (a public opinion research company), and Agência Anhanguera de Notícias (AAN), which served as the group’s news agency.

In the year following the acquisition of Diário do Povo, the Godoy family’s media group was reorganized into the present-day Rede Anhanguera de Comunicação (RAC), becoming a regional news network. The RAC Group owns several other newspapers in the cities of Campinas, Piracicaba, and Ribeirão Preto, in addition to Correio Popular, including Gazeta do Cambuí, Gazeta de Piracicaba, Gazeta de Ribeirão, and Revista Metrópole, which is distributed on Sundays together with the print edition of Correio Popular.

In 2007, the RAC Group launched a new daily newspaper, ''Notícia Já'', which, paradoxically, became a competitor to ''Diário do Povo'' within the same media group due to the similarity of their content, both targeting the working-class and popular readership of Campinas. This strategy left the nearly century-old newspaper with a significantly reduced readership and, consequently, fewer advertisers.

During the 2000s, the daily newspapers ''Metro'' and ''Destak'' also entered the Campinas media market. Their print editions were distributed free of charge in high-traffic public areas throughout the city. These new publications began competing directly with ''Diário do Povo'', contributing to a substantial decline in classified advertising revenue, much of which migrated to the internet. As a result, the newspaper’s circulation steadily declined to fewer than 8,000 copies per day. At the time, the publication had an average circulation of approximately 3,500 copies across Campinas and 23 other municipalities in the surrounding region.

In 2012, Diário do Povo ended its print edition, continuing to operate only as an online news outlet through its own website, which was launched on the same day as its final printed circulation in Campinas on September 4, 2012.
