= Grupo RBS =

Brazilian media conglomerate

RBS Participações S.A.
- Trade name: Grupo RBS
- Company type: Private
- Industry: Broadcasting; Publishing; Logistics
- Genre: Communications
- Founded: August 31, 1957 in Porto Alegre, Rio Grande do Sul
- Founder: Maurício Sirotsky Sobrinho
- Headquarters: Brazil
- Area served: Rio Grande do Sul
- Key people: Eduardo Sirotsky Melzer (Chairman)
- Net income: ▲ R$ 1.38 billion (2012)
- Number of employees: 6,000 (2015)
- Website: gruporbs.com.br

Grupo RBS is a Brazilian media conglomerate founded on August 31, 1957, by Maurício Sirotsky Sobrinho. One of Brazil's largest communication groups, it is also the largest affiliated with TV Globo. The media group is made up of radio and television stations as well as newspapers and online news portals, which deliver journalistic and entertainment content. With its more than 6,000 employees, Grupo RBS constitutes the second largest company in Brazil when it comes to the number of journalists employed.

Grupo RBS owns 12 broadcast TV stations affiliated with Rede Globo (RBS TV), two local broadcast TV stations (TVCOM Florianópolis and OCTO OC Porto Alegre), 24 radio stations (Rádio Gaúcha, Rádio Atlântida, Rádio Itapema, Rádio Cidade, Rádio Farroupilha, Rádio CBN Porto Alegre, Rádio CBN Diário, Rádio Rural), and eight newspapers (Zero Hora, Diário Gaúcho, Pioneiro, Diário de Santa Maria, Diário Catarinense, Hora de Santa Catarina, Jornal de Santa Catarina, A Notícia).

Grupo RBS also operates a digital company, e.Bricks Digital, made up of technology enterprises through which the media group operates in areas such as technology and digital media, mobile and segment-specific e-commerce.

Grupo RBS has yet other branches of operation: HSM (executive education, media and events company) – Digital Product Development unit – Kzuka (aimed at young audiences) – Events – RBS Publicações (book publishing) – Orbeat Music (record company) – Mídia Gráfica (printing) – Vialog (logistics company) – Fundação Maurício Sirotsky Sobrinho (social trust).

== Institutional campaigns ==
Institutional campaigns are one of Grupo RBS' most traditional actions and one of its most important social investment traditions. Entirely nonprofit and noncommercial, the social awareness campaigns involve all of the company's multimedia platforms, as well as its co-workers, and include branches such as editorial (news broadcast/published by the group's media outlets), advertising (advertisements carried on all media), and institutional (mobilization actions alongside government and community agents).

In recent years, RBS has raised its voice on a variety of issues such as road safety, child protection and crack cocaine abuse prevention. These campaigns have achieved countless results, among which are the establishment of a Child and Youth Debate Day; a partnership with the National Justice Council for the country-wide airing of the Crack, Nem Pensar ('Don't Even Think About Crack') campaign in 2011 (drug abuse prevention campaign); and the establishment of the Crack, Nem Pensar Institute (the 'Don't Even Think About Crack Institute'), based in Porto Alegre.

=== 'Love is the Best Inheritance, Take Care of the Kids' ===
The campaign O Amor é a Melhor Herança, Cuide das Crianças ('Love is the Best Inheritance, Take Care of the Kids') was launched in June 2003, intended to highlight the importance of societal care for children and teens. The campaign also featured five friendly monsters and her cubs: the Devil, the Bogeyman, the Witch, the Headless Mule and the Black Face Ox. At the end of 2003 the sixth monster joined, the Bad Wolf with its pups.

=== 'Education Needs Answers' ===
The campaign A Educação Precisa de Respostas ('Education Needs Answers') was launched in 2012 as a broad awareness campaign. Led by Grupo RBS, it aims to bring forward discussion groups and the search for solutions to raise the level of primary education across Brazil, especially within the states of Rio Grande do Sul and Santa Catarina. The campaign was a three-part partnership with Fundação Maurício Sirotsky Sobrinho (FMSS) (editorial, advertising and institutional). It also makes education the main focus of Grupo RBS' social investment, reinforcing the company's focus on ongoing community development.

Grupo RBS' educational campaign will take on a new phase in 2013. Education-related subjects will continue to be featured in RBS' media outlets while new institutional actions will promote more community-based engagement throughout the year.

== Segments ==
=== Television ===
- RBS TV
- TVCOM (Florianópolis only)
- OCTO OC

=== Radio ===
- Farroupilha AM+FM
- Rural AM
- CBN 1340, Porto Alegre
- Rede Gaúcha Sat
- Itapema FM
- Rede Atlântida
- CBN Diário, Florianópolis

=== Rio Grande do Sul ===
- Farroupilha AM on frequency 680 kHz AM
- 92 FM on frequency 92.1 MHz FM
- CBN Porto Alegre AM, Porto Alegre on frequency 1,340 kHz AM
- Rádio Gaúcha Porto Alegre, on frequency 600 kHz FM and on frequency 93.7 MHz FM; Santa Maria, on frequency 105.7 MHz FM; Caxias do Sul, on frequency 102.7 MHz FM
- Rádio 102.3 FM Porto Alegre, on frequency 102.3 MHz FM
- Rede Atlântida

=== Rio Grande do Sul ===
- Atlântida Caxias do Sul - 105.7 MHz[21]
- Atlântida Passo Fundo - 97.1 MHz[22]
- Atlântida Pelotas - 95.3 MHz[23]
- Atlântida Porto Alegre - 94.3 MHz[24]
- Atlântida Rio Grande - 102.1 MHz[25]
- Atlântida Santa Cruz - 93.3 MHz[26]
- Atlântida Santa Maria - 94.3 MHz[27]
- Atlântida Tramandaí - 104.7 MHz[28]

=== Santa Catarina ===
- Atlântida Blumenau - 102.7 MHz[29]
- Atlântida Joinville - 104.3 MHz[30]
- Atlântida Chapecó - 99.3 MHz[31]
- Atlântida Criciúma - 97.3 MHz[32]
- Atlântida Florianópolis - 100.9 MHz[33]
- CBN Diário Florianópolis on frequency 740 kHz AM[34]

=== Newspapers ===
- Zero Hora
- Diário Gaúcho
- Pioneiro
- Diário de Santa Maria
- Diário Catarinense
- Jornal de Santa Catarina
- Hora de Santa Catarina
- A Notícia
- O Sol Diário; a supplement for the group's Santa Catarina newspapers inserted in the editions destined for the Itajaí micro-region and displaying regional news articles.

=== Internet ===
- clicRBS
- hagah
- Predicta
- ObaOba
- Pense Imóveis
- Pense Carros
- Pense Empregos
- Guia Da Semana
- Grupo .Mobi
- Wine Vinhos
- Lets
- Vitrinepix
- Hi-Mídia

=== Logistics ===
- Vialog

=== Other ventures ===
- Book publisher: RBS Publicações
- Record company: Orbeat Music
- Trust: Fundação Maurício Sirotsky Sobrinho

== See also ==
- List of newspapers in Brazil
