= RBS TV =

Brazilian regional television network

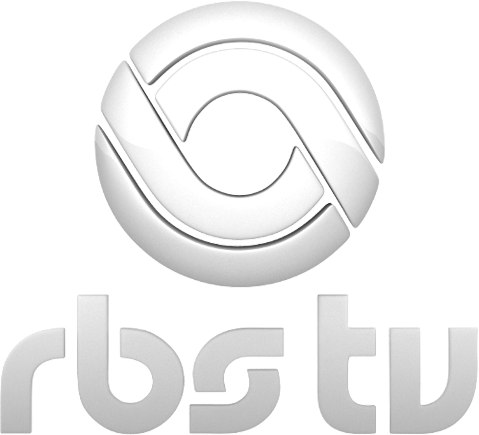
- Type: Broadcast television network
- Country: Brazil
- Availability: Rio Grande do Sul
- Founded: 29 December 1962
- Headquarters: Porto Alegre
- Key people: Claudio Toigo (Grupo RBS Chairman); Marco Gomes; Marta Gleich
- Launch date: 29 December 1962
- Former names: TV Gaúcha (1962-1983)
- Callsign meaning: Rede Brasil Sul de Televisão
- Affiliation: TV Globo (1967-)
- Group: Grupo RBS
- Former affiliations: Emissoras Unidas (1962-1963); Rede Excelsior (1963-1967)

RBS TV is a Southern Brazilian television network owned by Grupo RBS, and one of the oldest Rede Globo affiliates. The acronym originally stood for Rede Brasil Sul de Televisão (English: "Brazil South Television Network"), but currently the network never uses its full name on-air.

RBS TV owns 12 television stations in Rio Grande do Sul. RBS TV Porto Alegre is the flagship station.

RBS TV stations produce an average amount of local and regional programming, composed mainly of news, but also drama series, documentaries, sports, variety and youth programming.

== History ==
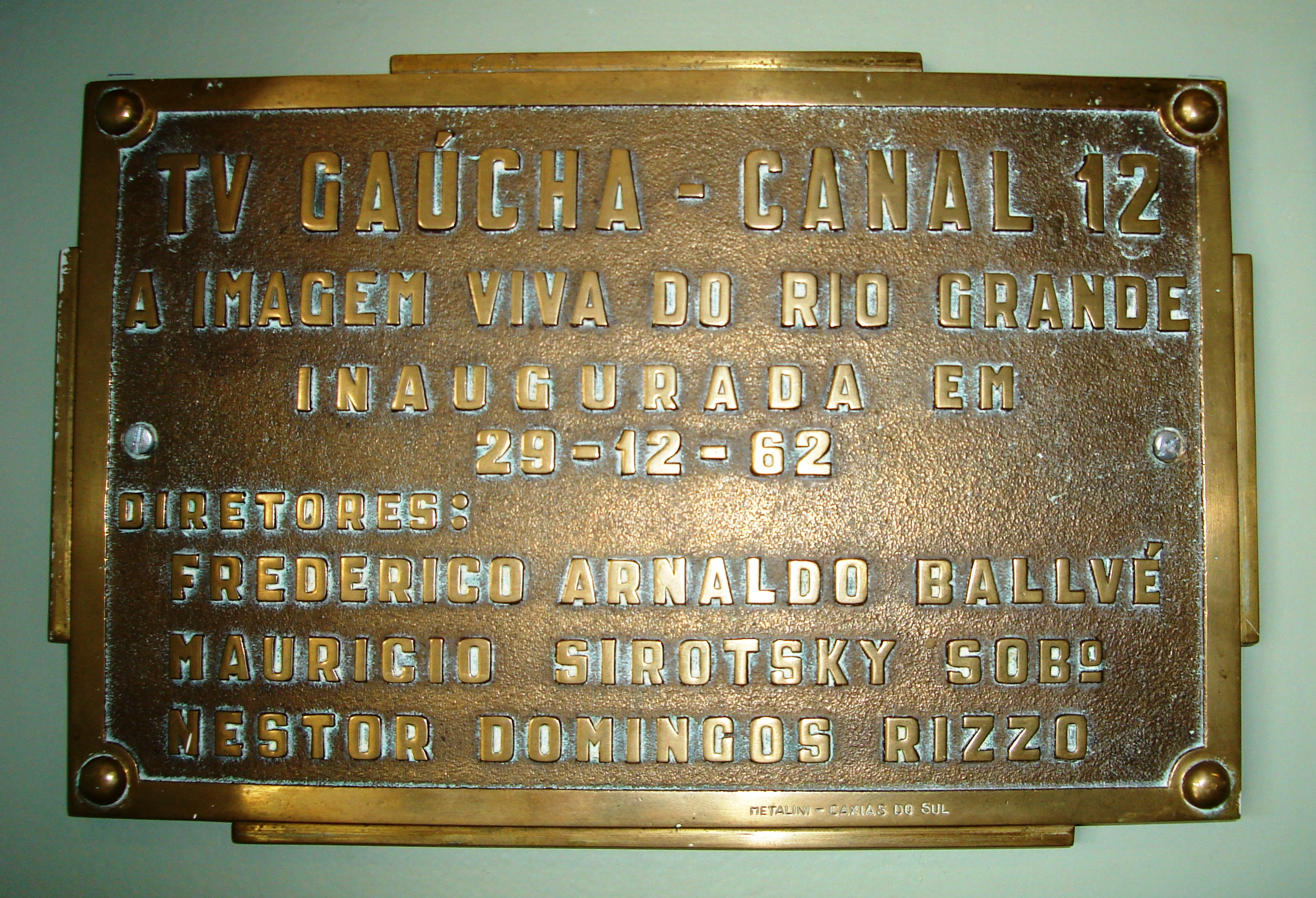
Plaque commemorating the launch of TV Gaúcha, March 2009.

RBS TV logo from 2008 to 2019

TV Gaúcha was created in 1962 in Porto Alegre, Rio Grande do Sul, and would later become RBS TV Porto Alegre. The following year, TV Gaúcha affiliated itself with Rede Excelsior. Rede Globo was launched in Rio de Janeiro two years later, but TV Gaúcha would only become its affiliate in 1967.

The first inland stations signed on in 1969, in Santa Maria and Caxias do Sul.

In 1979, it started to operate in Florianópolis, the capital city of Santa Catarina. This new purchase obliged the network to change its name to something less Rio Grande do Sul-related (as the word "Gaúcha" was), and it was rebranded RBS TV that same year. The Santa Catarina stations were eventually renamed NSC TV after being sold by RBS TV to the new owners in 2016.

== Stations ==
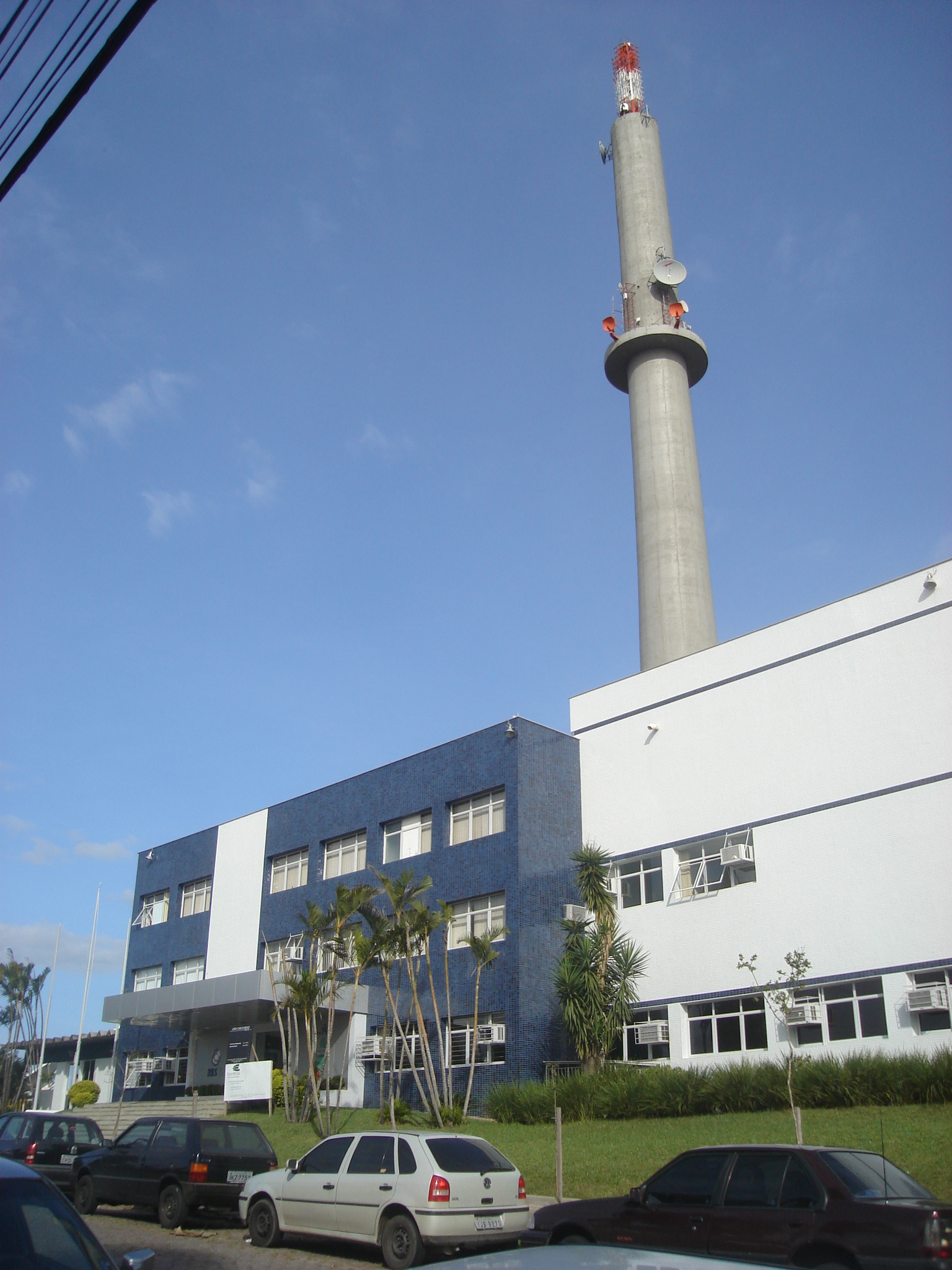
RBS TV Porto Alegre.

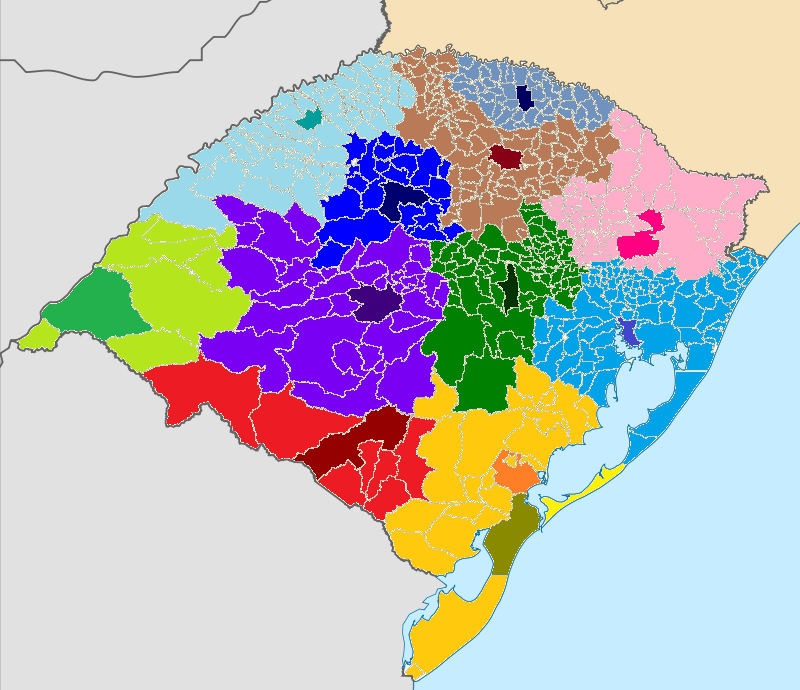
Division of RBS TV's coverage area by station.

=== Rio Grande do Sul ===
Station	Analog channel	Digital Channel	City
RBS TV Porto Alegre	—N/a	12 (34 UHF)	Porto Alegre
RBS TV Bagé	—N/a	34 UHF	Bagé
RBS TV Caxias do Sul	—N/a	8 (33 UHF)	Caxias do Sul
RBS TV Cruz Alta	3 VHF	33 UHF	Cruz Alta
RBS TV Erechim	2 VHF	33 UHF	Erechim
RBS TV Passo Fundo	7 VHF	34 UHF	Passo Fundo
RBS TV Pelotas	—N/a	4 (34 UHF)	Pelotas
RBS TV Rio Grande	—N/a	9 (33 UHF)	Rio Grande
RBS TV Santa Cruz	—N/a	6 (33 UHF)	Santa Cruz do Sul
RBS TV Santa Maria	—N/a	12 (33 UHF)	Santa Maria
RBS TV Santa Rosa	—N/a	6 (34 UHF)	Santa Rosa
RBS TV Uruguaiana	—N/a	13 (34 UHF)	Uruguaiana

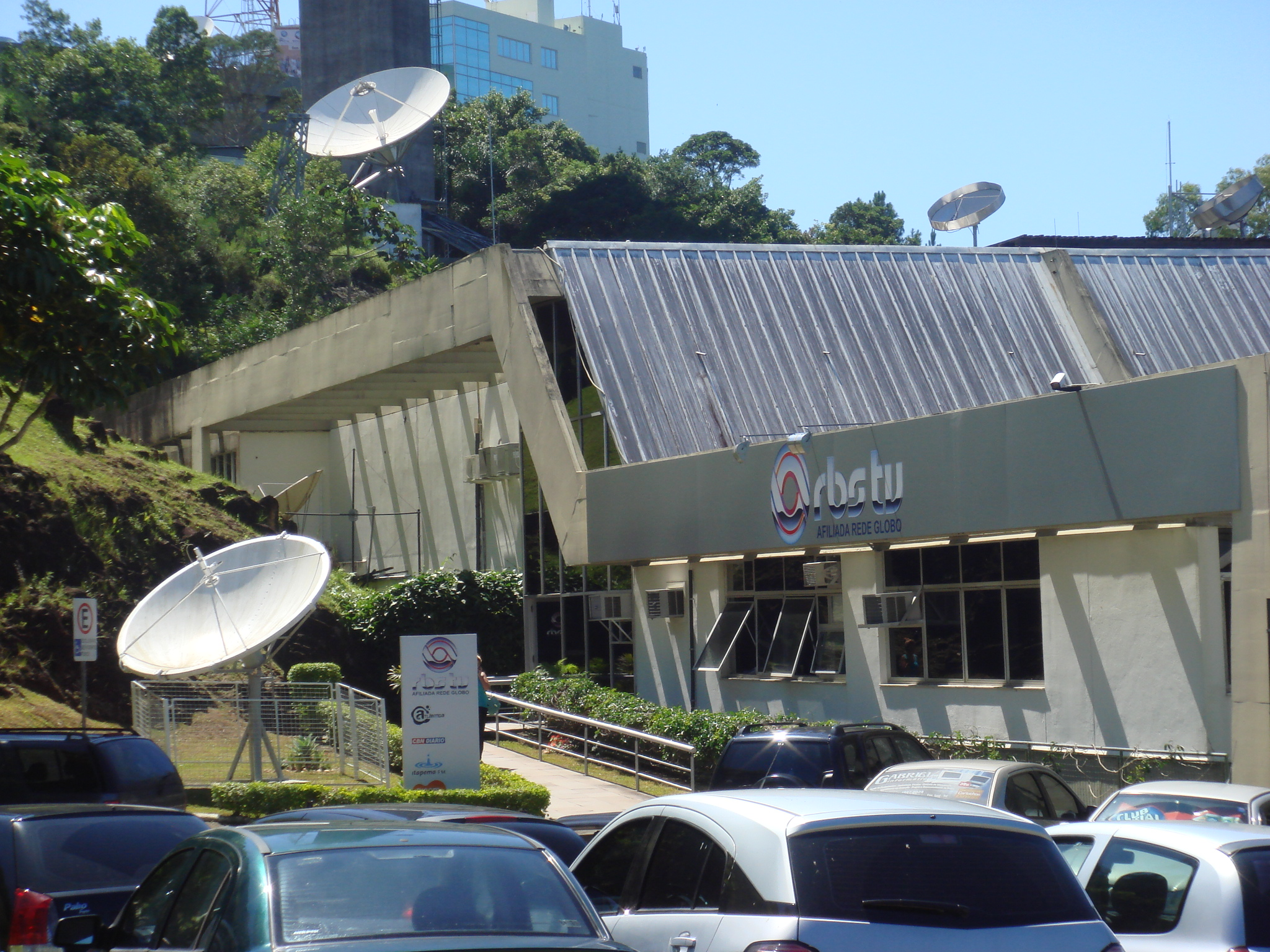
RBS TV Florianópolis.

=== Santa Catarina (formerly) ===
- RBS TV Florianópolis (Florianópolis) - 12
- RBS TV Blumenau (Blumenau) - 3
- RBS TV Centro-Oeste (Joaçaba) - 6
- RBS TV Chapecó (Chapecó) - 11
- RBS TV Criciúma (Criciúma) - 9
- RBS TV Joinville (Joinville) - 5

=== Corporate slogans (translated to English) ===
- 1962-1963 Rio Grande's living image.
- 1987-1992: A station serving the community.
- 1996-2000: All for You.
- 2000-2003: We show, you see.
- 2003-2008: Your Life on TV.
- 2008-2012: We do it for you.
- 2012-2015: We do it with you.
- 2015-2019: The TV connects us.
- 2019–present: Well for you.

== Inquiry on RBS Group oligopoly / monopoly practicing ==
The RBS Group is being investigated by the practice of oligopoly / monopoly. In 2008, the Federal Prosecutor of Santa Catarina has filed a public civil action (Case No.. 2008.72.00.014043-5) against the company oligopoly Rede Brasil Sul (RBS) in southern Brazil. The MPF requires the company, among other measures, to reducing its number of TV and radion stations in the states of Santa Catarina (SC) and Rio Grande do Sul (RS), so that to be in according to the Brazilian law; and the cancellation of the purchase of the newspaper A Notícia from Joinville, consummated in 2006 - which resulted in a virtual monopoly over the relevant newspapers in the state of Santa Catarina.

In 2009, the Federal Prosecutor in Canoas (RS), Pedro Antonio Roso, asked the chairman of the RBS Group, Nelson Pacheco Sirotsky, among other informations, the number of TV and radio stations that the company owns in Rio Grande do Sul, "as well as its affiliates, stations and repeaters." The request is part of an administrative proceeding brought by federal prosecutors "to determine possible occurrence of monopolistic practices and irregularities in granting Radio and Television to the RBS Group in Rio Grande do Sul".
