= History of Fluminense FC =

History of Brazilian association football club Fluminense Football Club

This page lists some of the main events in the history of Fluminense Football Club, a Brazilian sports club founded in Laranjeiras, Rio de Janeiro, on July 21, 1902. Since its founding, the club has primarily focused on association football. Its most notable titles include the 2023 Copa Libertadores, the 2024 Recopa Sudamericana, four Brazilian championships (in 1970, 1984, 2010, and 2012), the 2007 Copa do Brasil, and 33 Rio de Janeiro state championships. The club also won the 1952 Copa Rio.

== Chronology ==
=== 1902: First steps ===
==== Founding of Fluminense Football Club ====
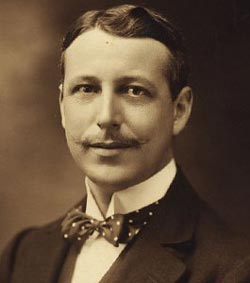
Oscar Cox, the club's main founder.

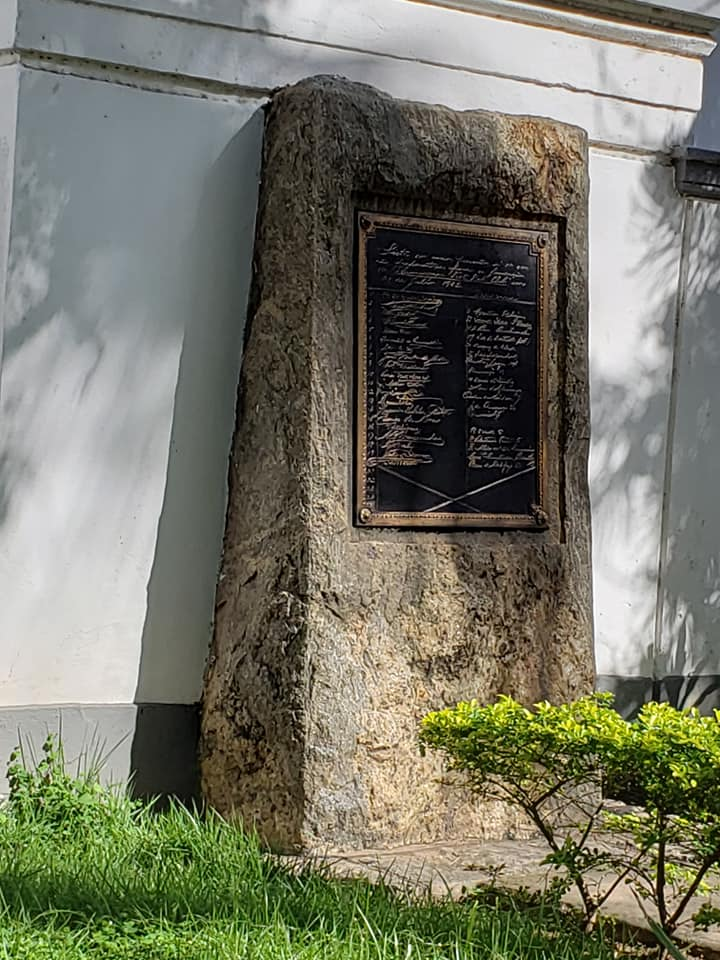
Mural paying homage to the club's founders.

The year was 1901, and the young Oscar Alfredo Cox was returning from Switzerland, where he had studied and developed a passion for football. Upon arriving in Brazil, he played a key role in introducing the sport to the country. On August 1, 1901, the first team assembled by Oscar Cox and his companions traveled to Niterói to face a squad of English players. His most significant achievement, however, came on July 21, 1902, when, together with twenty other individuals, he founded Fluminense Football Club during a meeting at Rua Marquês de Abrantes, 51, which was then the residence of Horácio da Costa Santos.

The name Fluminense emerged naturally, without much debate, although the initial idea had been Rio Football Club. Fluminense ultimately prevailed, derived from the Latin flūmen, meaning "river". The term is also used to refer to natives of the State of Rio de Janeiro (Flūmen Januarii, in Latin).

Oscar Cox introduced and promoted football in Brazil and was involved in the founding of Fluminense, one of the country's early football clubs. From that period onward, Fluminense played a role in the development of Brazilian football, including organizing matches and related activities.

Oscar Cox, Mário Frias, and C. Robinson signed the invitation cards for those interested in the meeting of November 30, 1901, which would address the founding of Rio Football Club, the first club in the city dedicated exclusively to the sport brought from England. However, the idea failed.

The following year, after a match between combined teams from Rio and São Paulo in the state capital of São Paulo, in which Oscar Cox left an Englishman from Paissandu Atlético Clube off the team, the excluded Mr. Makintosh, alongside Brazilian João Ferreira, appropriated the name Rio FC and founded the club on July 12.

For this reason, Cox's invitation this time was more emphatic. The postcard sent by Álvaro Costa contained the following text: "The founding of this club will be discussed in a meeting that will take place on Monday, the 21st of the current month, at 8:30 p.m., at Rua Marquês de Abrantes No. 51. Signed: The Committee".

The 20 participants were considered founding members, "without entitlement to privileges," and elected Oscar Cox as president. They signed the attendance list in this order: Horácio Costa Santos (host), Mário Rocha, Walter Andreas Schuback, Félix Frias, Mário Frias, Heráclito de Vasconcellos, Oscar Alfredo Cox, João Carlos de Mello, Domingos Moitinho, Louis da Nóbrega Júnior, Arthur Gibbons, Virgílio Leite (then president of Clube de Regatas do Flamengo), Manoel Rios, Américo da Silva Couto, Eurico de Moraes, Victor Etchegaray, A. C. Mascarenhas, Álvaro Drolhe da Costa, Júlio de Moraes, and A. H. Roberts. Then, the mission became finding a playing field.

Fluminense Football Club was founded at the home of Horácio da Costa Santos, at Rua Marquês de Abrantes, number 51, in the Flamengo neighborhood of Rio de Janeiro. The founding session, held on July 21, 1902, was chaired by Manoel Rios and recorded by Oscar Cox and Américo Couto. Oscar Cox was elected the first president of the club by vote among all founding members. At that meeting, Manoel Rios became the entity's first secretary. On October 17 of the same year, the club was already established in Laranjeiras, a prestigious neighborhood in Rio de Janeiro.

All of its founders were cariocas, except Víctor François Etchegaray, Argentine, and A. H. Roberts, English, considering only their places of birth and not other nationalities, as in the case of Oscar Cox, but in the early years, among its members, there were several foreigners, mostly British and German. Walter Andreas Schuback was the son of Germans but was born in Rio de Janeiro. In 1903, the Englishman Francis Henry Walter, member number 88 of the club, was the only person born outside Brazil to preside over Fluminense up to the present day.

Fluminense was the first prosperous club in Carioca football, as well as the oldest major Brazilian club in terms of football practice. Initially, the team wore white and gray uniforms.

Fluminense's first match was played on October 19, 1902, against Rio Football Club, at the Paysandu field in Laranjeiras, the first thrashing: Fluminense won 8–0. On September 6, 1903, the debut in interstate matches took place, with three games at the Velódromo field in São Paulo. The Carioca squad recorded one draw and two victories.

On July 15, 1904, after an Extraordinary General Assembly, Fluminense replaced the previous shirt with the tricolor one. It adopted the three colors present in the anthem composed by Lamartine Babo: green, white, and garnet, which became the club's colors. The first tricolor shirt of Fluminense was created in 1905, with Flu playing its first match in its traditional tricolor shirt on May 7, 1905, in a friendly in which it defeated Rio Cricket by 7–1.

The public, ever growing, expressed its enthusiasm for football, which contributed to the emergence of new clubs, even leading to the start of matches between Carioca and Paulista combined teams in 1910. Years later, thanks to the pioneering of the Tricolor, the first Brazilian National Team was called up.

==== Club headquarters ====
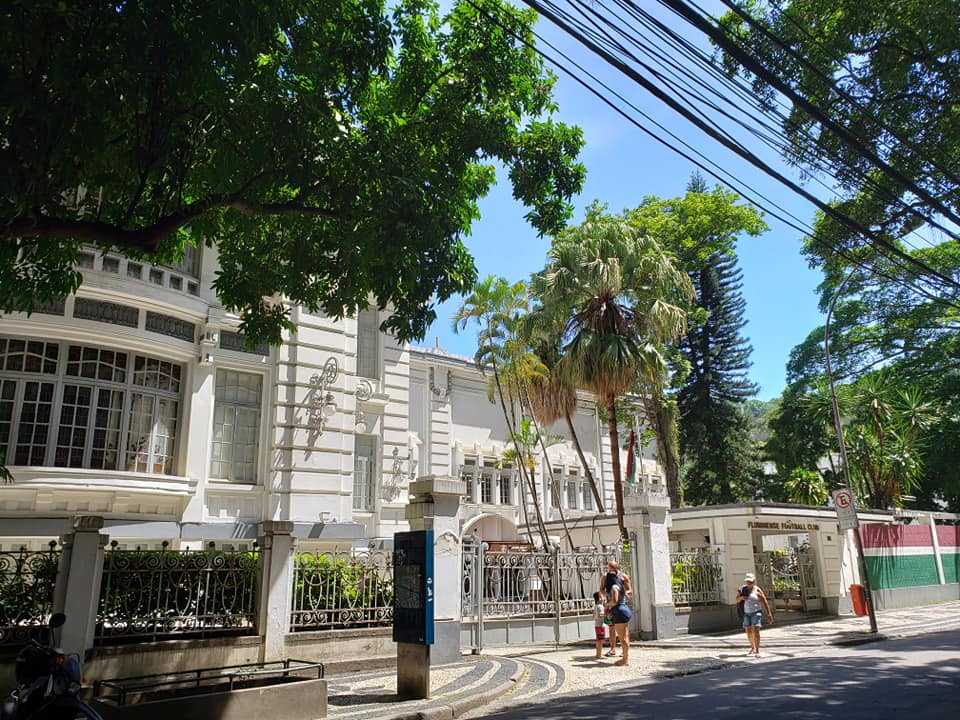
Entrance to the tricolor headquarters.

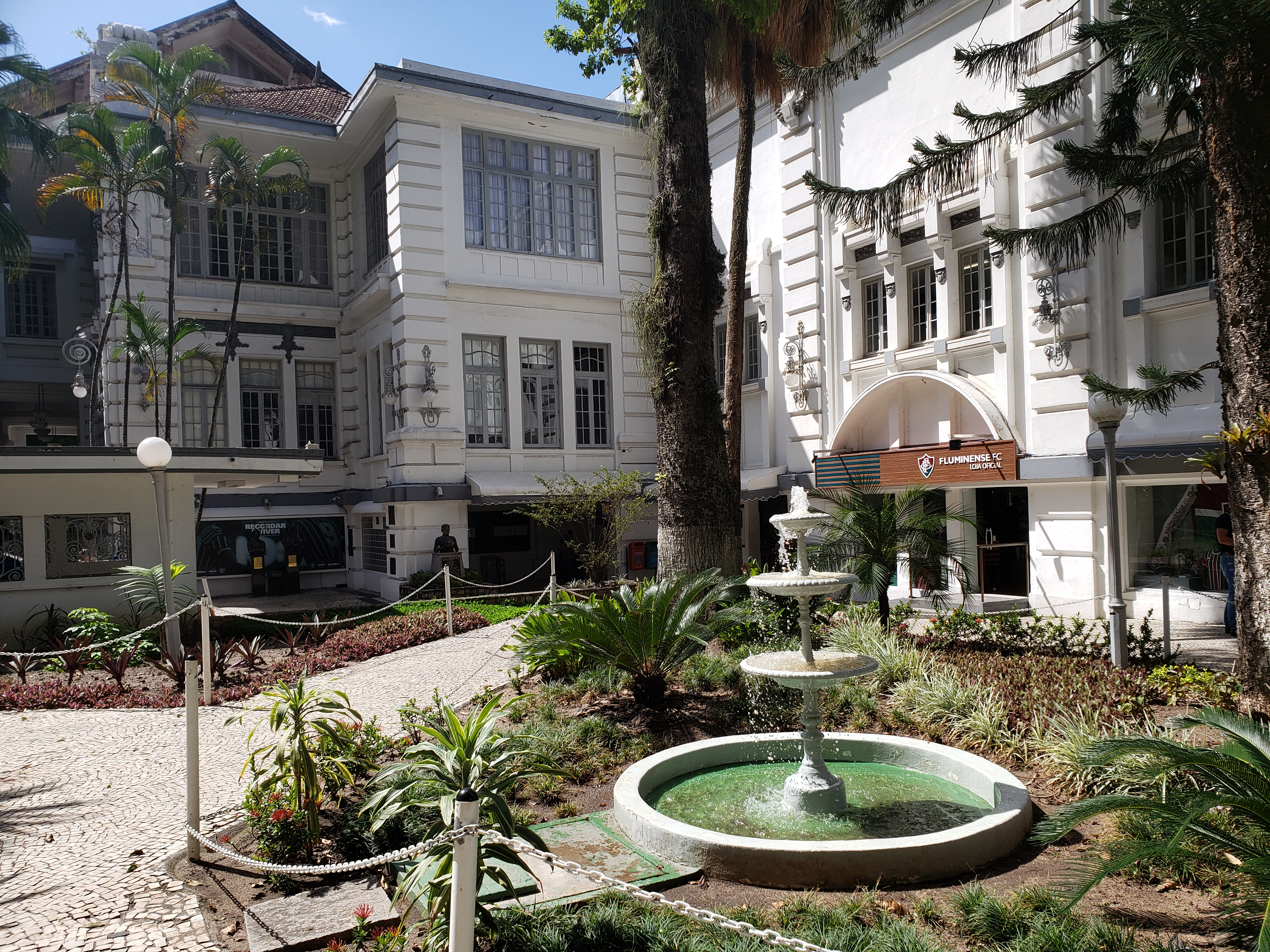
View of the headquarters from the entrance.

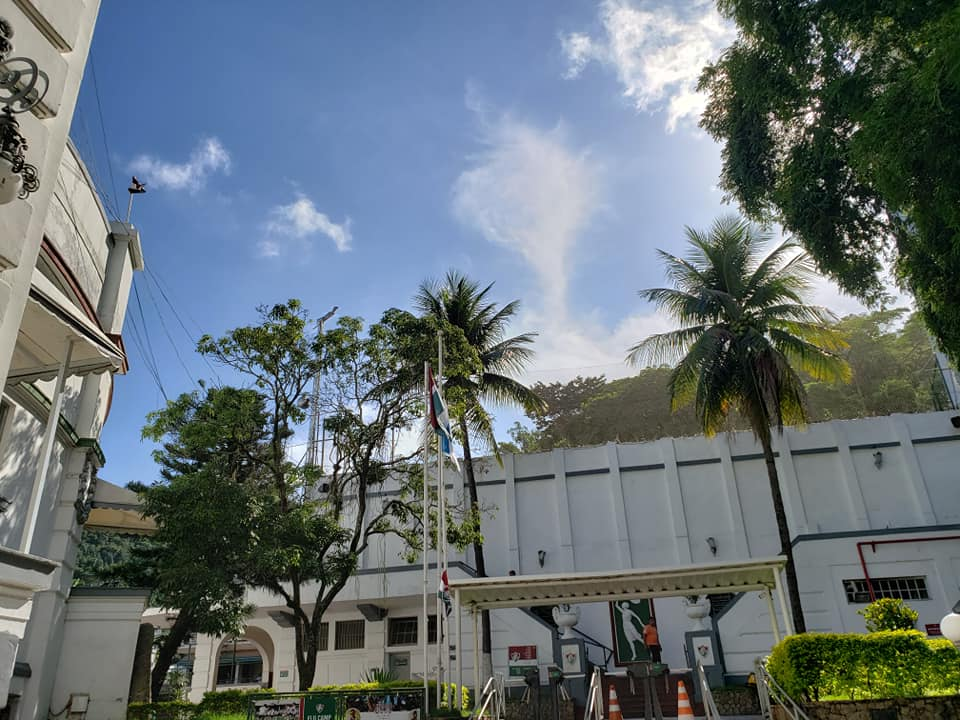
Internal appearance.

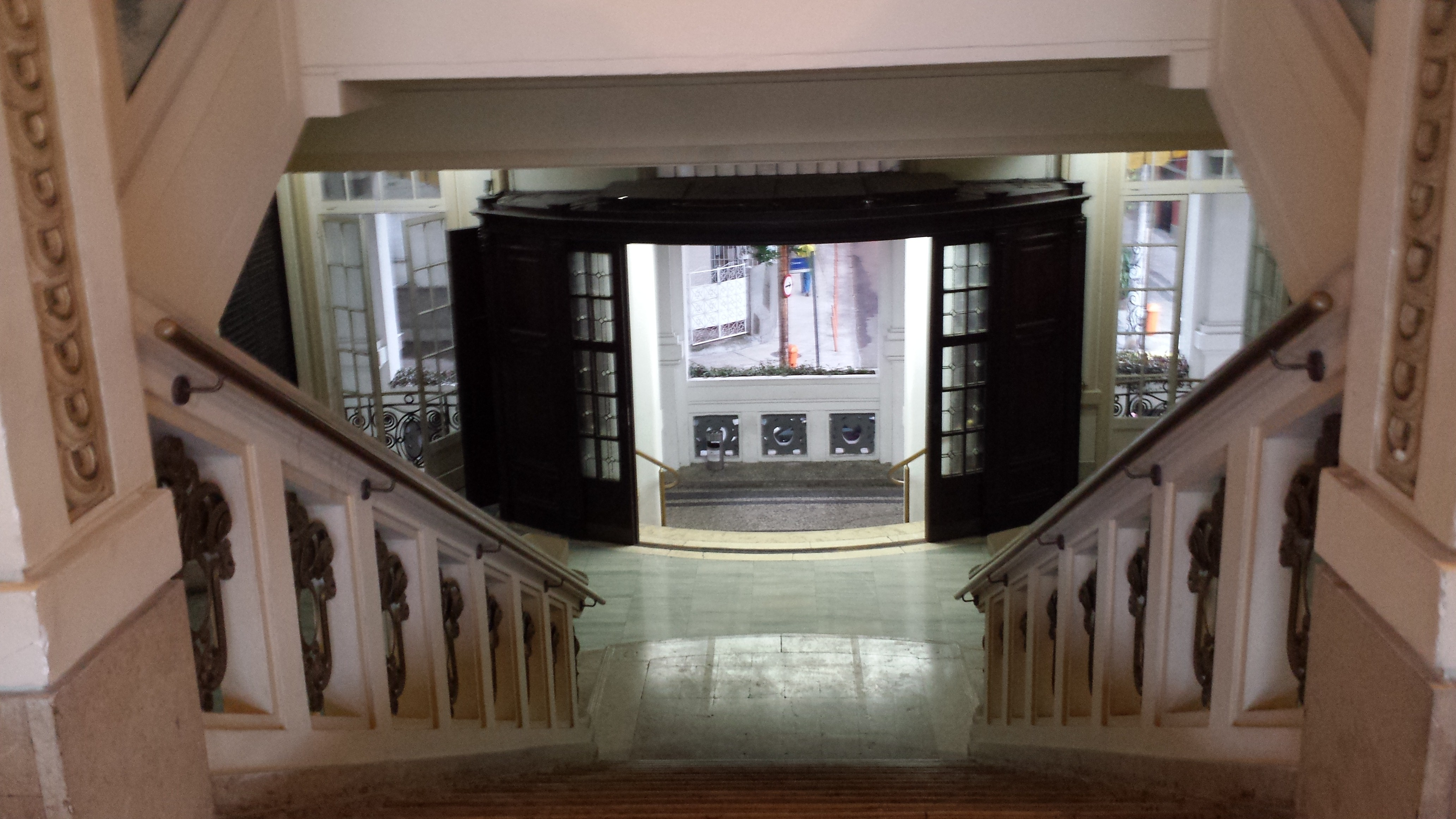
Access to the Noble Hall.

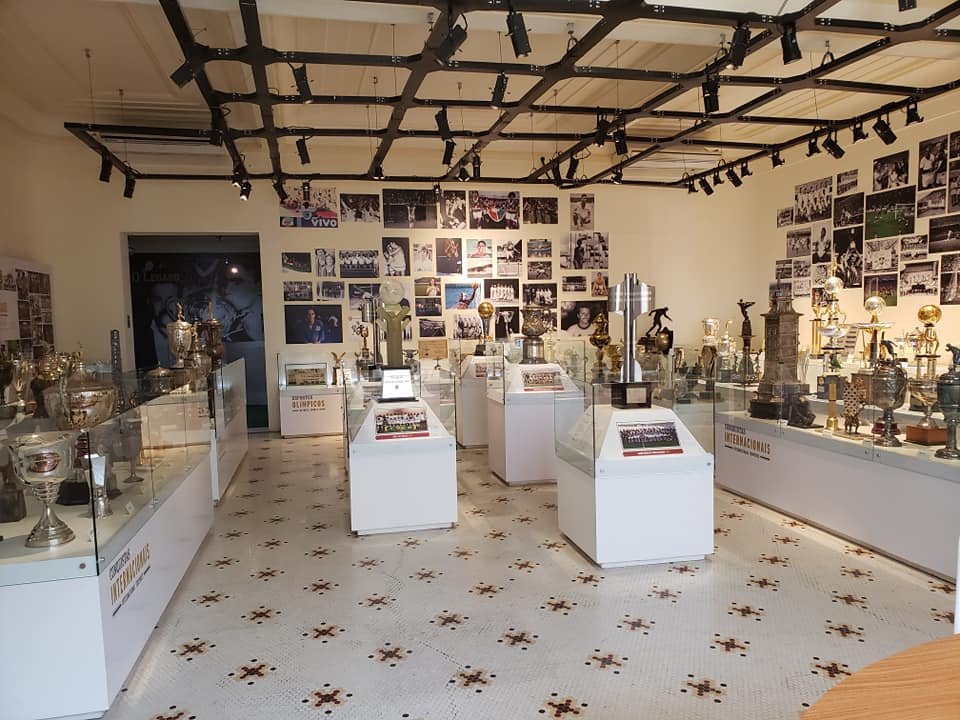
The old trophy room.

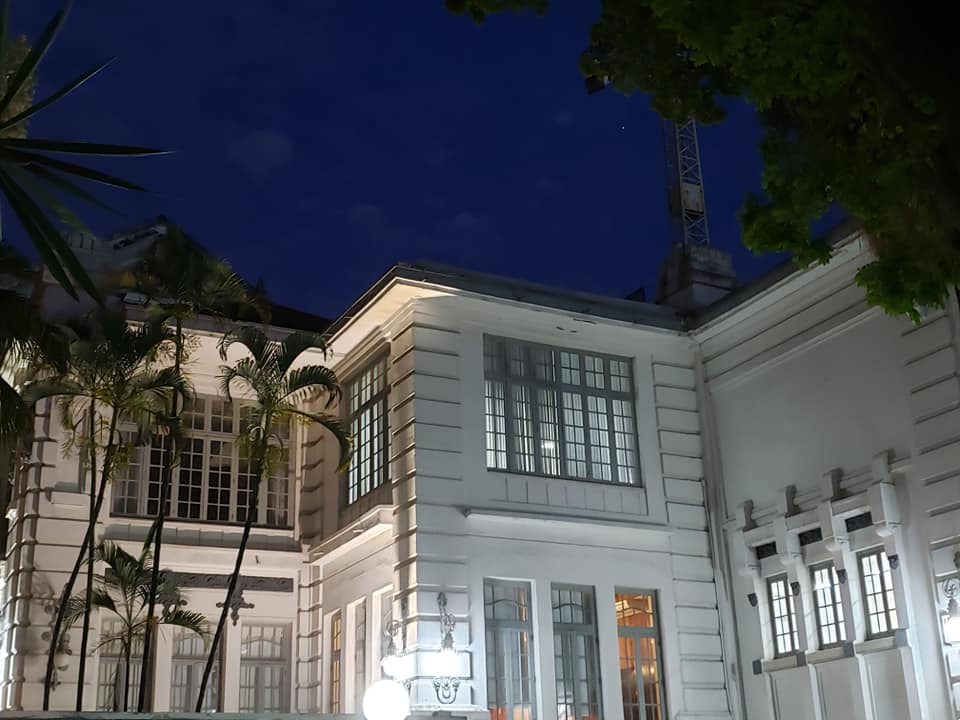
The headquarters at night.

Fluminense Football Club obtained its first headquarters on October 17, 1902. The club's initial location was at Rua Guanabara, now Pinheiro Machado, at the corner with Rua do Roso, now Coelho Netto, in the Carioca neighborhood of Laranjeiras. Fluminense rented the land from Banco da República for one hundred thousand réis. However, the founders' first choice was a plot on Rua Dona Mariana, but the proposal was rejected by the owner.

Only a year later was the land leveled. At the time, the leveling machine and the lawn mower were pulled by a donkey. To preserve the work already done, the animal was always fitted with velvet gloves on its four hooves. "Faísca" then became famous and known as the "most elegant donkey in Rio de Janeiro".

Later, the land was purchased by Eduardo Guinle, and construction work on the headquarters immediately began. Before that, it was a small white house that served as housing for the watchman. After installing water pipes and a bathroom, Flu was already paying double the rent.

On August 14, 1904, the first interstate match was held at the Rua Guanabara field, against Paulistano. This was the inaugural match of the new sports venue in Rio de Janeiro, and Fluminense's board had a small wooden stand built to accommodate the public, charging the first tickets for a football match. In addition to Fluminense members and invited guests, 806 cards were distributed by members, and 190 tickets were sold to non-members at the box office, with the ticket costing 2$000 and revenue of 1:992$000.

In 1905, Eduardo Guinle built, at his own expense, the first stand in Rio de Janeiro football fields. Upon completion of this improvement, the rent tripled again. In the same year, through a loan among members, the first headquarters was demolished, and the second was built.

The inauguration of the third headquarters, on July 27, 1915, was widely celebrated, culminating in a dance at the skating rink, when the first Fluminense anthem, authored by Paulo Coelho Netto, was sung.

Still in 1915, President Cunha Freire built a private stand for members and their families. The expansion plan was completed with the construction of a new rink, acquisition of furniture, electrical installation, enlargement of the stands, and construction of the general admission areas.

In 1918, work began on renovations that would result in the fourth headquarters of Fluminense. The works were completed in 1920, under the presidency of Arnaldo Guinle, who hired the Catalan architect Hipòlit Gustau Pujol Jr. to design the facilities. With French stained glass and crystal chandeliers, the Noble Hall became the stage for many shows, dances, parades, operas, and ballets. Even today, it is widely used for parties, meetings, and filming of movies and miniseries, such as "Anos Dourados", "Dona Flor e seus dois maridos", "Villa-Lobos - Uma Vida de Paixão", telenovelas, and commercials. The headquarters is owned by the club and is now listed as historical heritage.

In 1961, at the request of the city hall and the state government, part of its land was expropriated by the extinct Superintendence of Urbanization and Sanitation for the expansion of Rua Pinheiro Machado — an area of 1,084 square meters —, which culminated in the demolition of part of the stand. The government compensated the club for the loss of its assets, and Flu once again provided a significant service to the city, despite suffering a major sporting loss.

=== 1902–1911: Pioneering and split ===
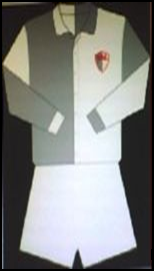
Representation of Fluminense's first uniform.

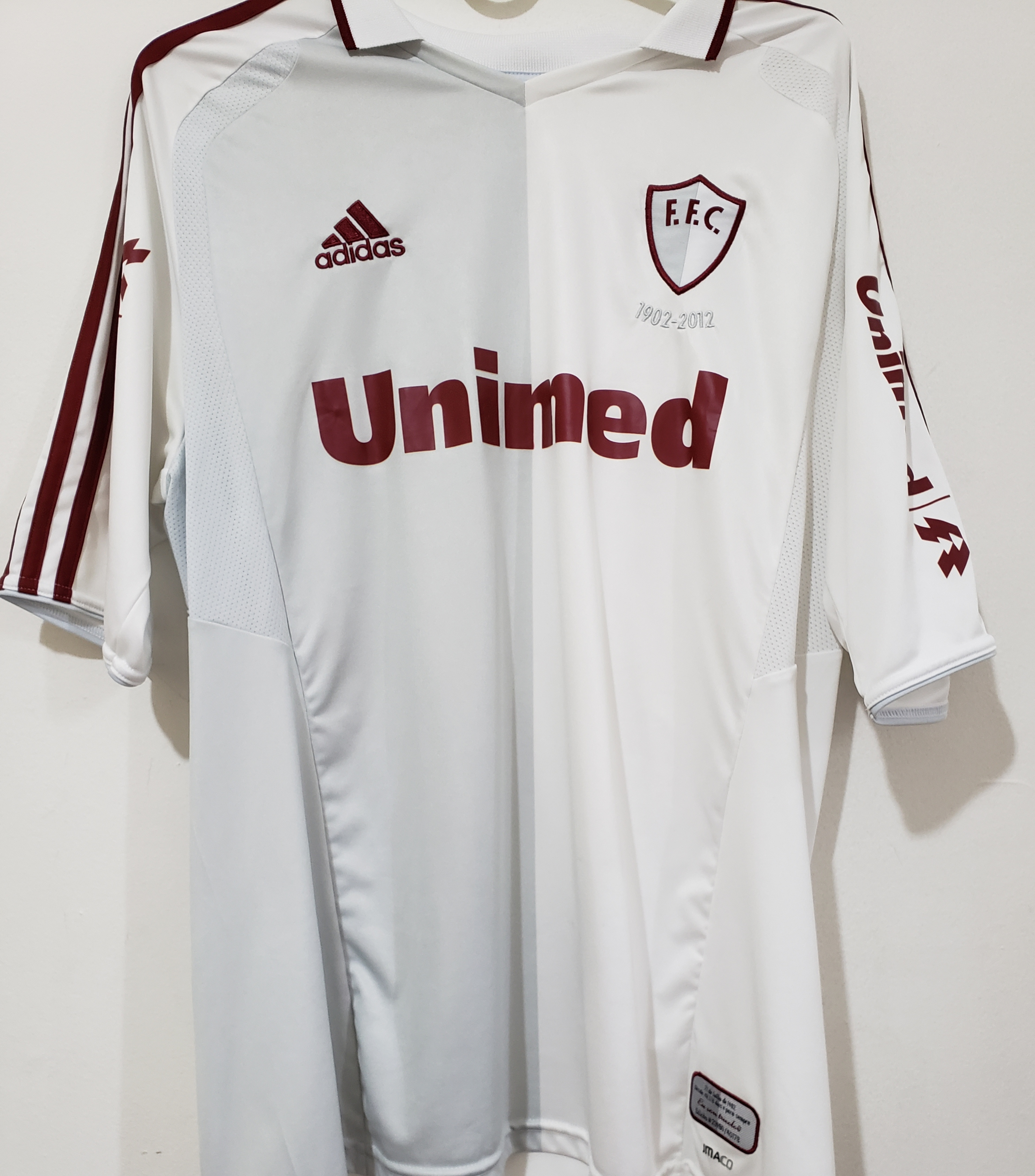
Commemorative shirt for the 2002 centenary, inspired by the first one.

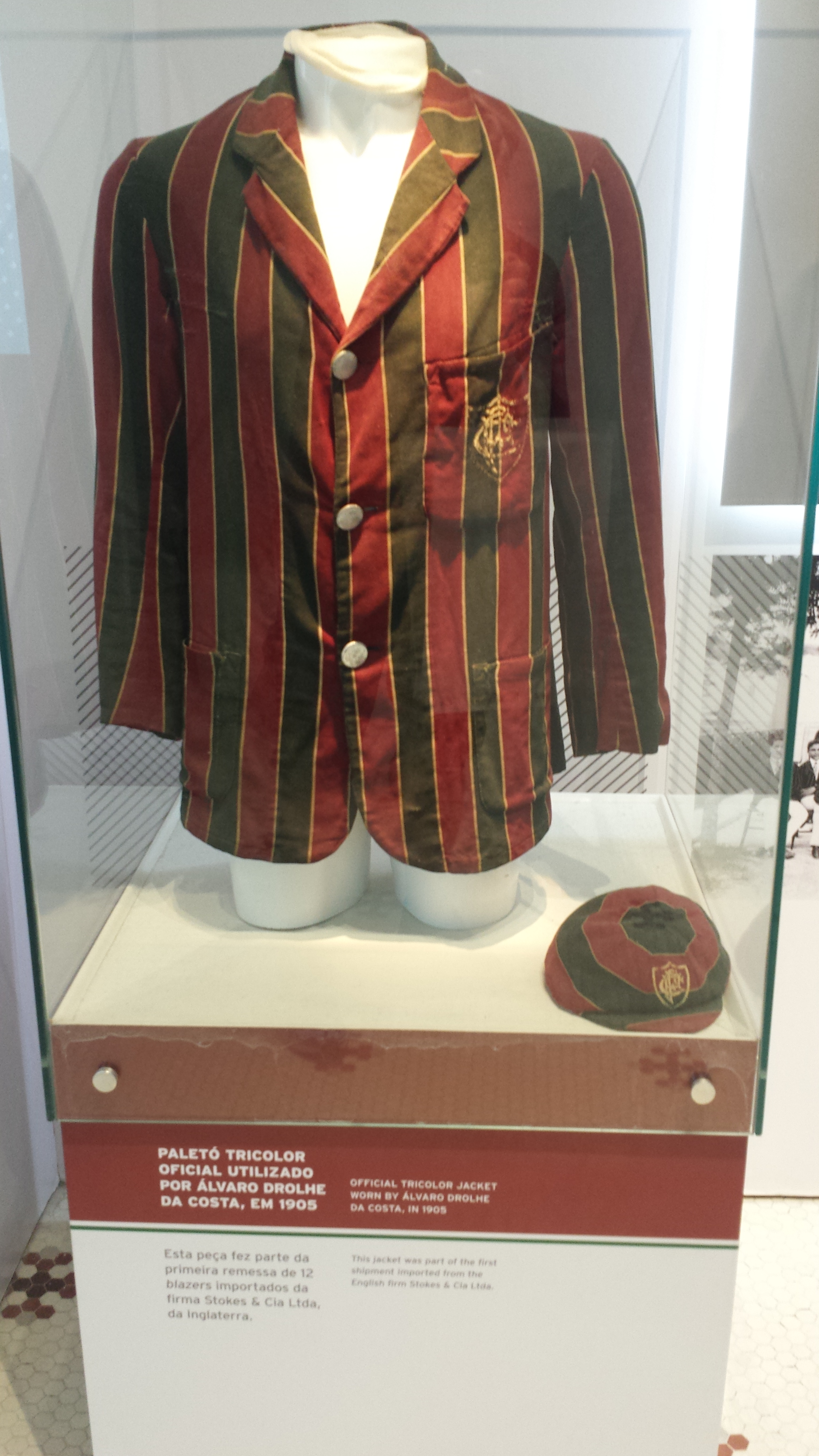
Uniform used in 1905 on display.

After introducing football to Rio de Janeiro in an organized manner, Oscar Cox and nineteen other enthusiasts founded Fluminense Football Club on July 21, 1902. The first official match took place at the field of Paysandu Cricket Club, when Fluminense defeated Rio Football Club 8–0 on October 19, 1902.

In September 1903, Fluminense made its debut in interstate matches, playing three games in São Paulo. After enduring fourteen hours of travel, it took the field to face Sport Club Internacional, drawing 0–0 on the 6th. Already rested, on the 8th of that month, it defeated Club Athletico Paulistano 2–1 on the 7th and São Paulo Athletic 3–0. At the end of the same year, Fluminense began efforts to found the Liga Carioca, which materialized on June 8, 1905, in a meeting held at the club, with representatives from five clubs besides Fluminense: America, Bangu, Botafogo, and Football Athletic, to which Rio Cricket and Paysandu joined in December as league members.

Fluminense promoted the visit of Club Athletico Paulistano in July 1905, playing two matches on the 14th and 16th, winning the first 2–0 and losing the second 3–2, with about 2,500 people attending each match, including the presence of the President of Brazil, Rodrigues Alves. Presidents of the Republic for decades attended major events at Fluminense, and some were members of the club.

On October 22, 1905, the first match between Fluminense and Botafogo took place, a date that marks the oldest football derby in Brazil, the Clássico Vovô. On that occasion, Fluminense won 6–0.

The first match in the history of the Carioca Championship occurred on May 3, 1906, when Fluminense defeated Paissandu 7–1 in Laranjeiras, in front of about a thousand fans.

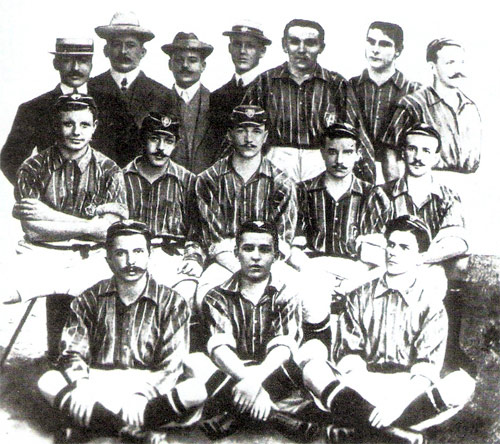
The team that won the Rio de Janeiro championship in 1906.

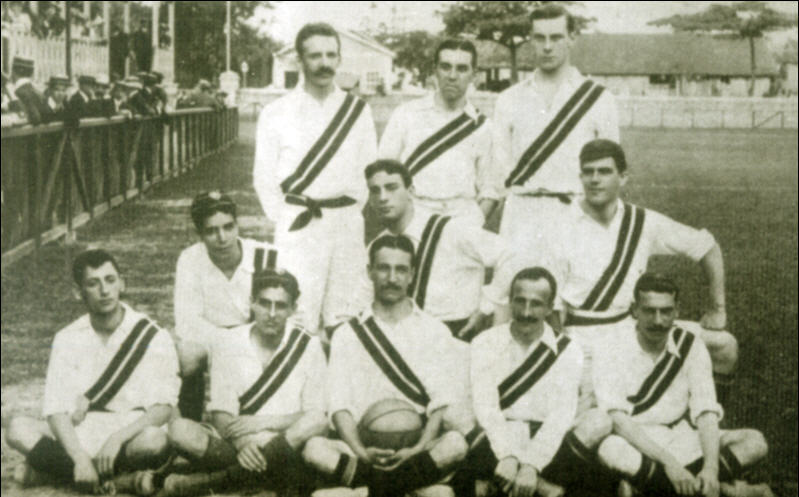
The team that won the Rio de Janeiro championship in 1907.

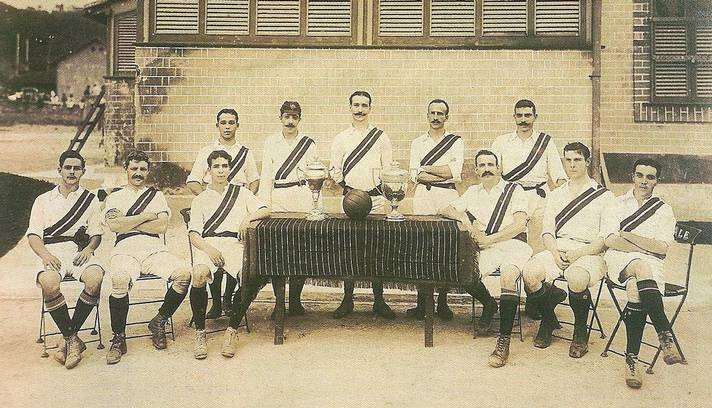
The team that won the Rio de Janeiro championship in 1908.

Between 1906 and 1911, Fluminense dominated Carioca football extensively, winning 5 of the first 6 championships. In these six initial championships, Fluminense achieved 43 victories, 5 draws, and only 4 defeats, with 217 goals for and 49 against. In 1907, when it finished the championship tied in points with Botafogo, it had the best goal difference in the championship and in the head-to-head, having also been undefeated champion in 1908, 1909, and 1911, the latter without losing any points.

In 1911, Edwin Cox, one of its main players, and the German Bruno Schuback, cousin of Cox's brother-in-law Walter Schuback, left the club to play for Grêmio, to which they also brought high organizational concepts, implementing some modifications in the Gaúcho club. At the end of this year, nine more of its starters left the club after a serious split, going on to found the football department of Flamengo.

In this year, Fluminense became the first club in Brazil to hire a professional coach for a long term, the English Charles Williams, recruited in London, and he had previously been the coach of Denmark's national football team, which won the silver medal at the 1908 Summer Olympics, at that time the most important football competition in the world. In 1907, the Scottish Jock Hamilton had been hired by Paulistano to coach the team for only 3 months, after which he returned to Fulham FC.

In 1911, after winning the Carioca Championship, an internal crisis emerged at Fluminense. Led by Alberto Borgerth, the split took nine Tricolor players to establish a football section at Clube de Regatas Flamengo, a club that focused solely on rowing.

The club's archives record the following facts: with two vacancies opened in the Ground Committee — the commission that evaluated the team lineup that would take the field, in July, with the dismissals of Ernesto Paranhos and Haroldo Cox, it was resolved that Oswaldo Gomes and Alair Antunes would be the candidates.

Oswaldo Gomes was already vice-captain of the first team by the board's choice, of which Alberto Borgerth was a part. This made him a natural candidate for one of the vacancies, or even captain. However, Oswaldo Gomes preferred to run for the Ground Committee, because Borgerth was the nominee for captain.

On the day of the meeting, an opposition candidate emerged — Joaquim Guimarães — and the vote ended in a tie: 15 votes for Oswaldo Gomes and 15 for Joaquim Guimarães. The president of the assembly then proposed considering the older candidate as the elected one and submitted this proposal to the members present for ratification or rejection. By 17 votes against, the Assembly approved the president's suggestion.

Oswaldo Gomes was elected, according to the majority, but did not accept, understanding that the issue should be resolved in another Assembly. On August 7, in a letter sent to the board, Gomes relinquished the position of vice-captain.

On the eve of the match against Rio Cricket, the committee met and selected a team. However, Borgerth suggested consulting the players, a suggestion that received majority support. Afonso de Castro, whose proposal was rejected, spoke out against the idea, arguing that it would set a bad precedent by transferring the Ground Committee's responsibilities to the players.

With the exception of Oswaldo Gomes and James Calvert, the other players spoke in favor of replacing Oswaldo with Arnaldo Guimarães and Paranhos with Borgerth, but the committee maintained the previous lineup, against Borgerth's vote, who agreed with the majority of the players. The team chosen by the committee took the field and won 5–0.

On October 3, however, Borgerth, Othon Baena, Píndaro de Carvalho Rodrigues, Emmanuel Nery, Ernesto Amarante, Armando de Almeida (Galo), Orlando Mattos, Gustavo de Carvalho, and Lawrence Andrews requested to leave Flu.

According to testimonies, some Tricolor players, including Borgerth, suggested joining Botafogo. However, they quickly dismissed the idea because Botafogo was their biggest rival at the time and had just become the 1910 Carioca champion. They believed that Botafogo was the team to beat.

Before choosing Flamengo, some considered Paissandu, which had only two good players. However, the idea was vetoed because it was an exclusively English club. "Let's go to Flamengo," Borgerth concluded.

The split that occurred within Fluminense in 1911 had Borgerth as one of its key figures. The departure of nine starting players from Flu to found the football section of CRF was not enough.

At that time, for a football club to succeed, it had to mandatorily be part of the Metropolitan Athletic Sports League, and for that to happen, two obstacles had to be overcome: CRF would need a playing field, and the league's regulations, which required at least one year of affiliation to compete in any championship, would need to be changed.

In a report by Borgerth himself, in the Fluminense Bulletin of June 1952, he mentions that the first obstacle was overcome when Fluminense leased its field to CRF for a negligible amount, and the second was achieved with Mario Pollo's great influence in the league, who managed to change the regulations, allowing Fla to compete in the 1912 Championship, won by Paysandu and by Botafogo in the Rio de Janeiro Football Association.

The definitive transfer of nine players from the 1911 champion team to the red-and-black team occurred at this time. The first Fla-Flu in history, which would later become one of the most traditional derbies in Brazilian football, was played on July 7, 1912, in Laranjeiras. On the one hand, there was Flamengo, who had just become the Carioca champions and were wearing new shirts. Fluminense played with a team of reserves, except for Oswaldo Gomes and James Calvert. Fluminense won 3–2 against Flamengo.

=== 1912–1924: The national team, the stadium, three consecutive titles, patriotism and the death of Mano ===
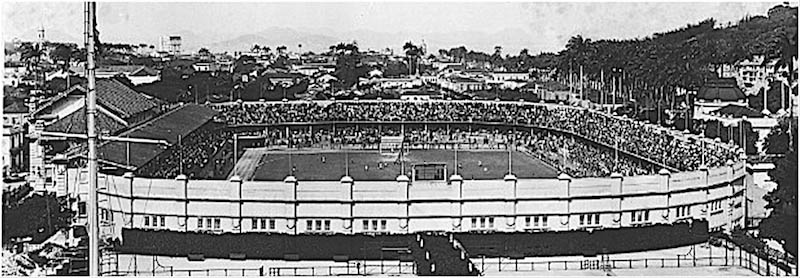
The Estádio de Laranjeiras in 1922.

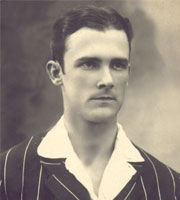
Marcos de Mendonça

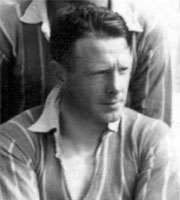
Henry Welfare

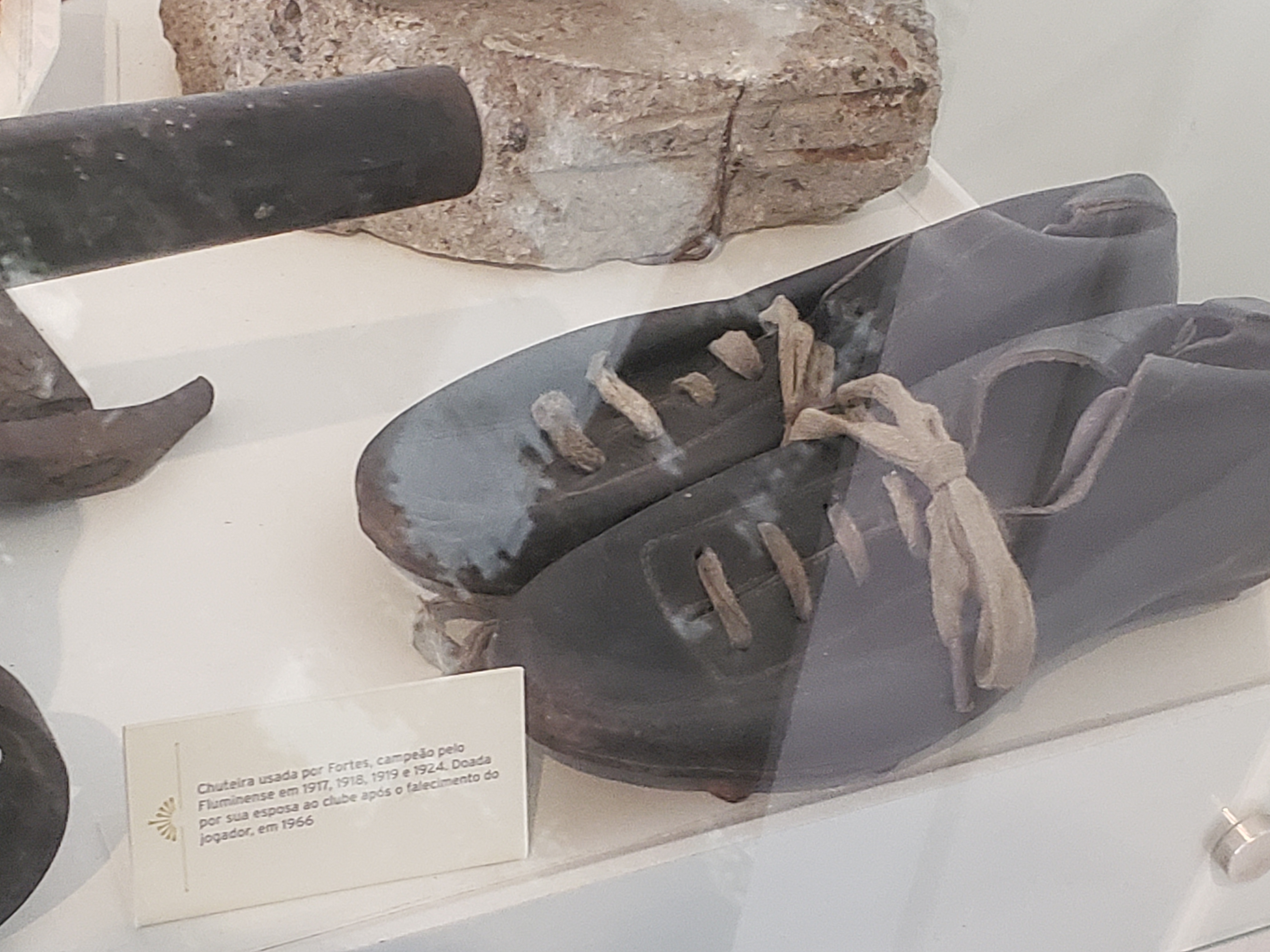
Boot worn by Fortes, champion in 1917, 1918, 1919, and 1924.

Although weakened, Fluminense still managed to win the first Fla-Flu 3–2, but they no longer had the strong squad from previous years. They did not win another significant title until 1917.

In 1914, America, the 1913 Carioca champions, suffered a crisis similar to that experienced by Fluminense in 1911. Seventy former America members, including players, decided to leave the club and join Fluminense. This crisis was triggered by sponsorship for the Chilean national football team's arrival in Brazil the previous year. This caused a deficit of $2,792,000 for the red club and led to discord between the groups led by president Alberto Carneiro de Mendonça and Belfort Duarte.

In 1914, Fluminense established the Youth Football Department, recruiting thirty boys aged between seven and twelve from Sport Club Curufaity who had previously belonged to Club Athletico Guanabara. By 1917, only three of the 1916 youth champions remained due to exceeding the age limit. That same year, Fluminense's youth teams comprised 110 players. They were champions in 1916, as well as winning the Torneio Início in both 1916 and 1917. They were also two-time champions in both years. However, activities ceased in 1918 due to a lack of playing fields while the Estádio das Laranjeiras was under construction, which blocked access to the old Campo da Rua Guanabara.

In the same year, the Brazilian National Team played its first match in history, at Fluminense's field, on July 21, 1914, on the club's twelfth anniversary, defeating Exeter City from England 2–0, with Tricolor Oswaldo Gomes scoring the first goal in the national team's history, with about 10,000 people attending Fluminense's field, most watching the match standing.

From then on, Fluminense's field became the first home of the national team. Between 1914 and 1932, the team remained undefeated in 18 matches played there. It was also the field where the Brazilian national team won its first two major titles: the South American Championship (now the Copa América) in 1919 and 1922.

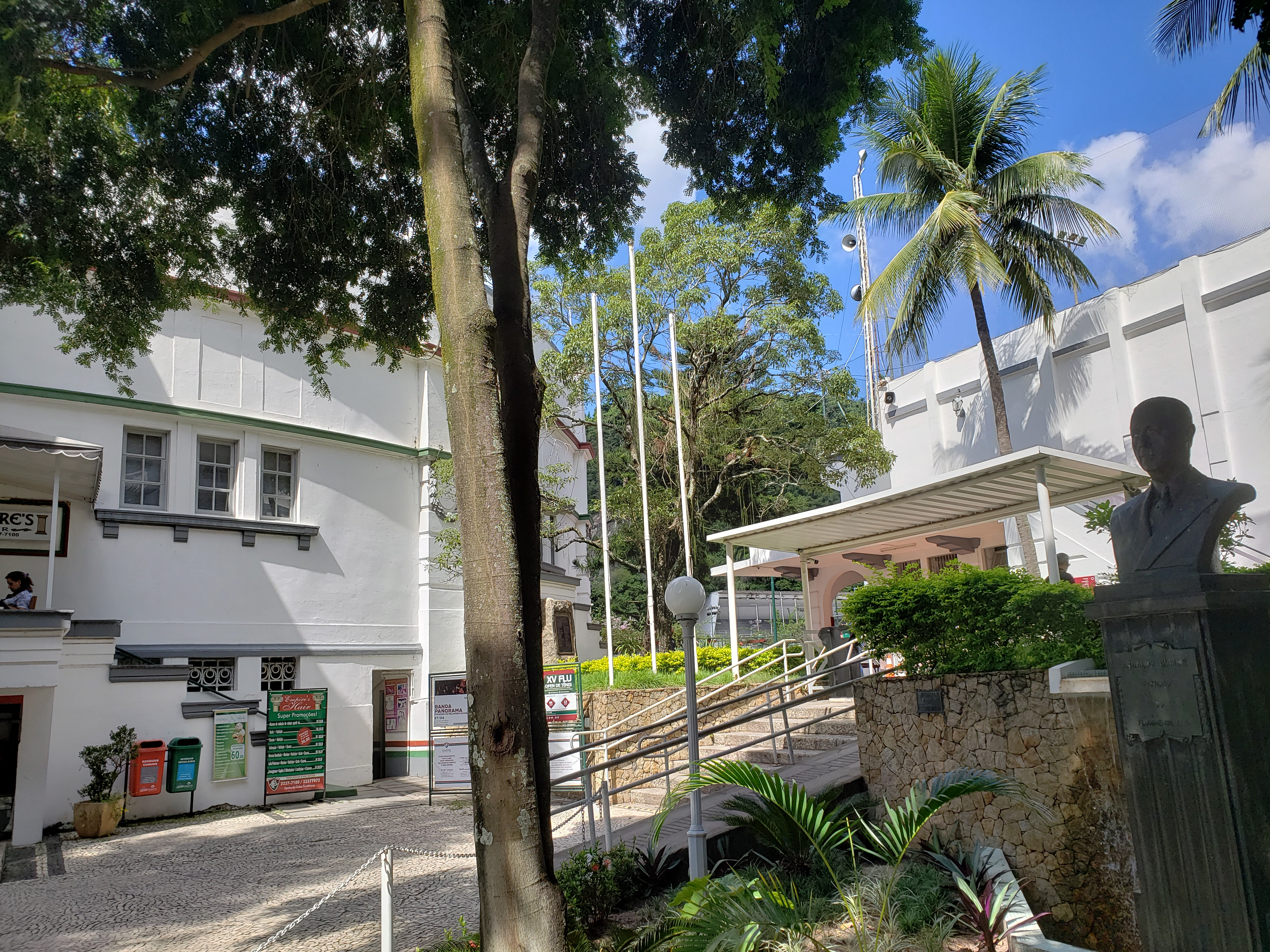
Bust of Arnaldo Guinle.

On 28 December 1916, the Tricolor's efforts to promote the development of Brazilian football entered a new phase. Arnaldo Guinle, president of Fluminense and the Brazilian Sports Confederation, secured provisional registration with FIFA. The Brazilian confederation achieved definitive status under the presidency of Oswaldo Gomes, another Tricolor, on 20 May 1923.

During the First World War, Fluminense formed a battalion which initially recruited 83 reservists, sparking a civic movement that was later adopted by Bangu and the league itself.

In 1915, Fluminense significantly expanded its headquarters, increasing the capacity of its stands to 5,000 people. Sharing the same ideals, Club Athletico Paulistano began recognising Flu members passing through São Paulo as temporary members.

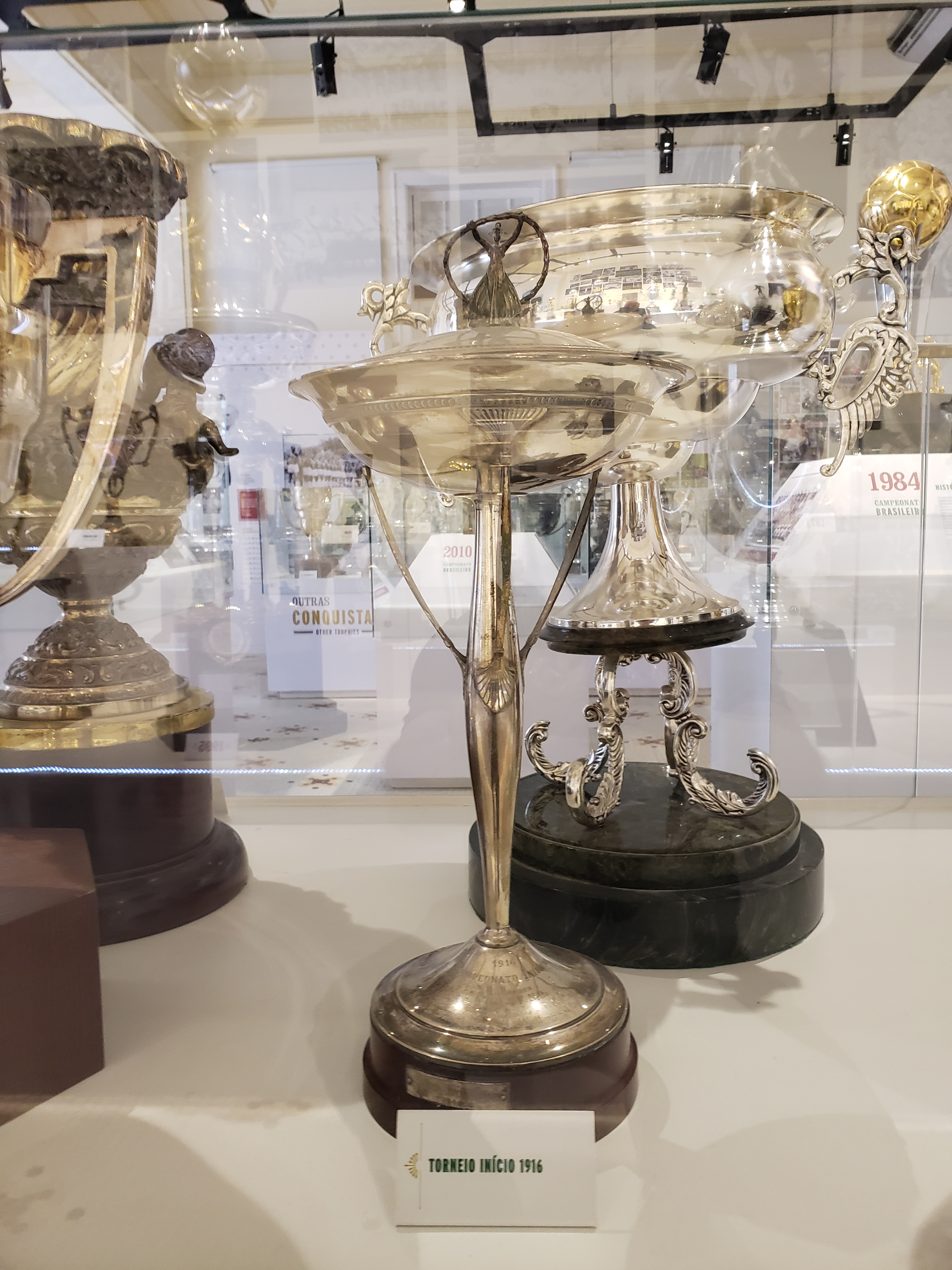
The 1916 Torneio Início trophy.

In 1916, Flu won the first Torneio Início by beating America 1–0 in the final, with Welfare scoring the winning goal.

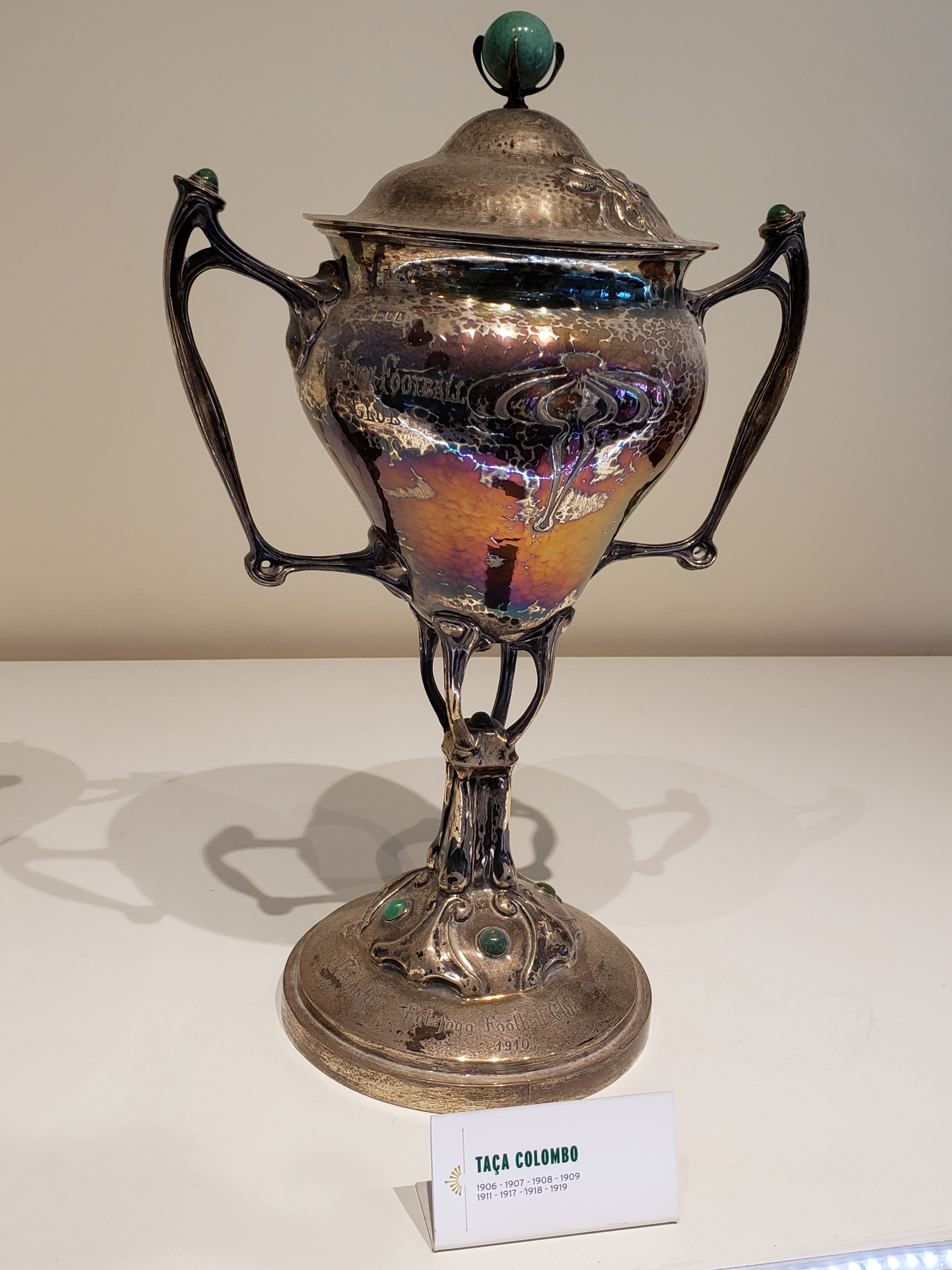
Colombo Cup won in 1919.

The period from 1917 to 1919 was full of significant events. On 2 October, the South American Football Confederation designated Brazil as the host of the 1918 South American Championship. However, as the Brazilian government was unable to host an event of such magnitude, responsibility for organising the tournament was handed over to Fluminense. The club took out a large loan from Banco do Brasil and received substantial contributions from its wealthy members and fans.

Due to the Spanish flu epidemic in several South American countries, this championship was postponed to 1919. Finally, on May 11 of that year, the Estádio das Laranjeiras, with a planned capacity for 18,000 spectators, was inaugurated with Brazil's victory over Chile 6–0, and right from the first match, attendance reached 25,000 people.

Fluminense won the Carioca championship three times in 1917, 1918 and 1919, having played 54 matches in these championships. They won 44 matches, drew five and lost only five, scoring 178 goals and conceding 56. Henry Welfare, their top scorer, scored 56 goals in this period.

According to Tomás Mazzoni's book, História do Futebol no Brasil, the 1919 Ioduran Cup ended up going to the Museu do Ipiranga in São Paulo as a conciliatory solution due to disagreements between Fluminense and Paulistano. Paulistano forfeited their match against Fluminense due to divergences between the Carioca and Paulista leagues, and Fluminense won by W.O. on 27 August. However, Paulistano believed they had the right to keep the cup as they were the previous year's champions (their possession of the cup was temporary).

At the 1920 Summer Olympics, Tricolor athlete Afrânio Antônio da Costa won the first Olympic medal in history for Brazil, taking silver in the shooting competition. On the same day, Afrânio and his fellow athlete from the Tricolor club, Guilherme Paraense, were part of the Brazilian team that won the bronze medal in the 50 m free pistol event. Guilherme Paraense also won Brazil's first gold medal at those Olympics.

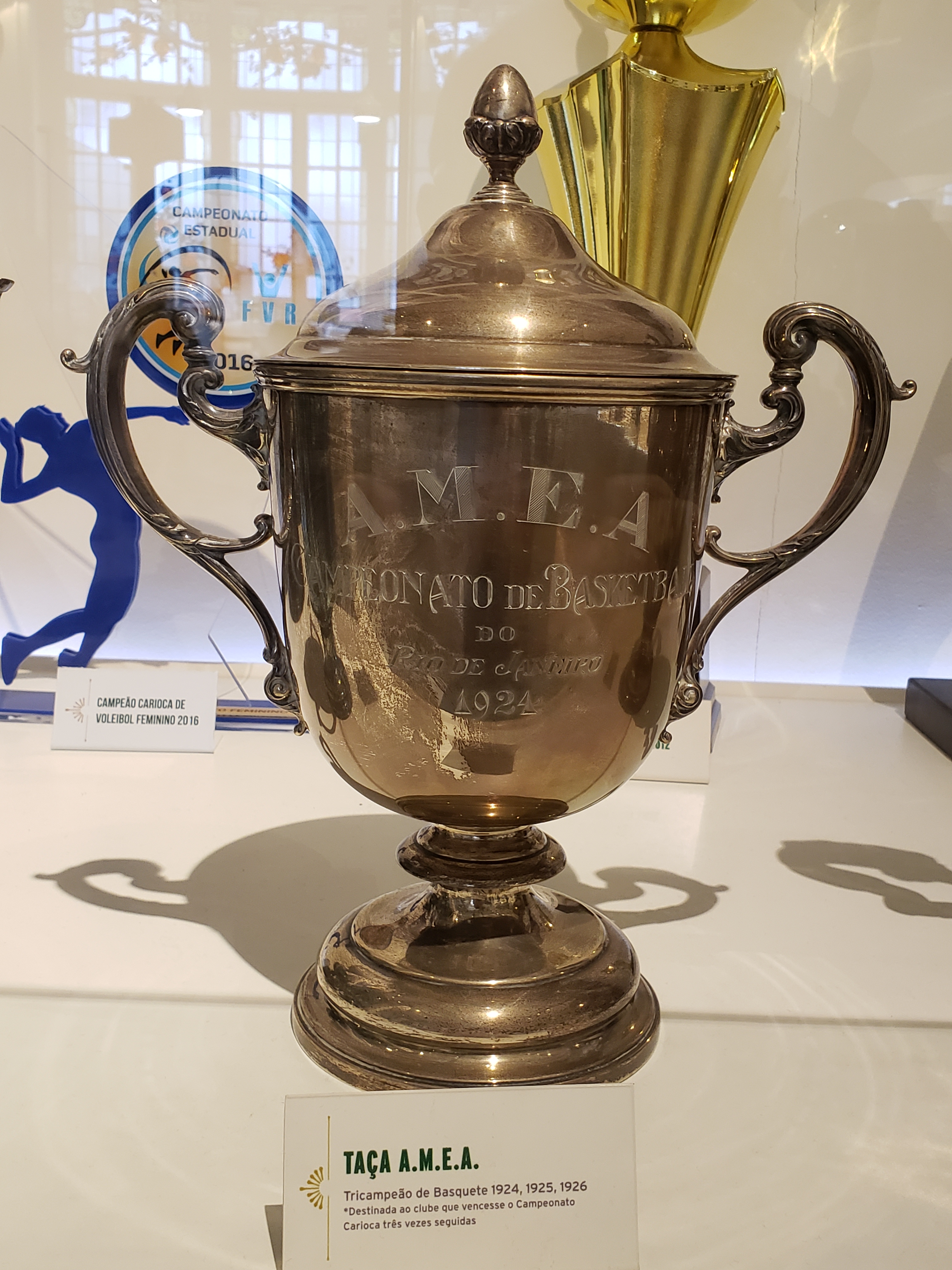
The AMEA Cup

In 1920, Fluminense invited the American basketball coach, Fred Brown, from Ohio to Brazil. A member of the YMCA, he established a coaching course, laying the foundations for organised basketball in Brazil. Brown was also the first coach of the Brazilian national team, and he led them to victory in their first competition, the Latin American Olympic Games. Five Flu players took part. During this period, Fluminense also introduced more sophisticated cultural events, including open-air cinema screenings and opera performances such as Aida at the stadium. On 28 May 1921, a significant cultural programme took place in the Noble Hall. From then on, Fluminense became a major cultural reference point in Rio de Janeiro, a status it retains to this day. The club has hosted the filming of scenes for soap operas and movies, as well as dances and other cultural activities.

In 1922, Fluminense, without the support of the Brazilian government which promised to share the competition costs but failed to fulfill the promise, promoted the South American Championship and the Latin American Olympic Games, a precursor to the Pan American Games, as major events commemorating the centenary of Brazil's independence. The high cost of adapting its headquarters was reflected in the football team's results for many years, as Flu, after winning the 1924 Carioca Championship, would only win it again in 1936. Among many other improvements made to the club in 1922, the Estádio das Laranjeiras was expanded to accommodate 25,000 spectators.

In the same year, Mano sustained an injury while playing for Fluminense against São Cristóvão. Despite this, he insisted on continuing to play until the end of the match. He died shortly afterwards from a systemic infection.

From the first half of the 1920s, Fluminense ceased to be a club for the elite as Brazilian football penetrated the culture of the working classes. It was one of the bastions in the fight for the professionalisation of players in 1933, ending the practice of restricting football to members or the so-called 'false amateurs' of some clubs who engaged in 'brown professionalism'.

Practiced since the second half of the 1910s, volleyball began to be organised in Brazil in 1923, through an initiative by Fluminense to promote a tournament bringing together clubs affiliated with the Metropolitan Land Sports League.

In 1923, Arnaldo Guinle founded the Christmas for Poor Children initiative, which donated toys to over 6,000 needy children in its first year.

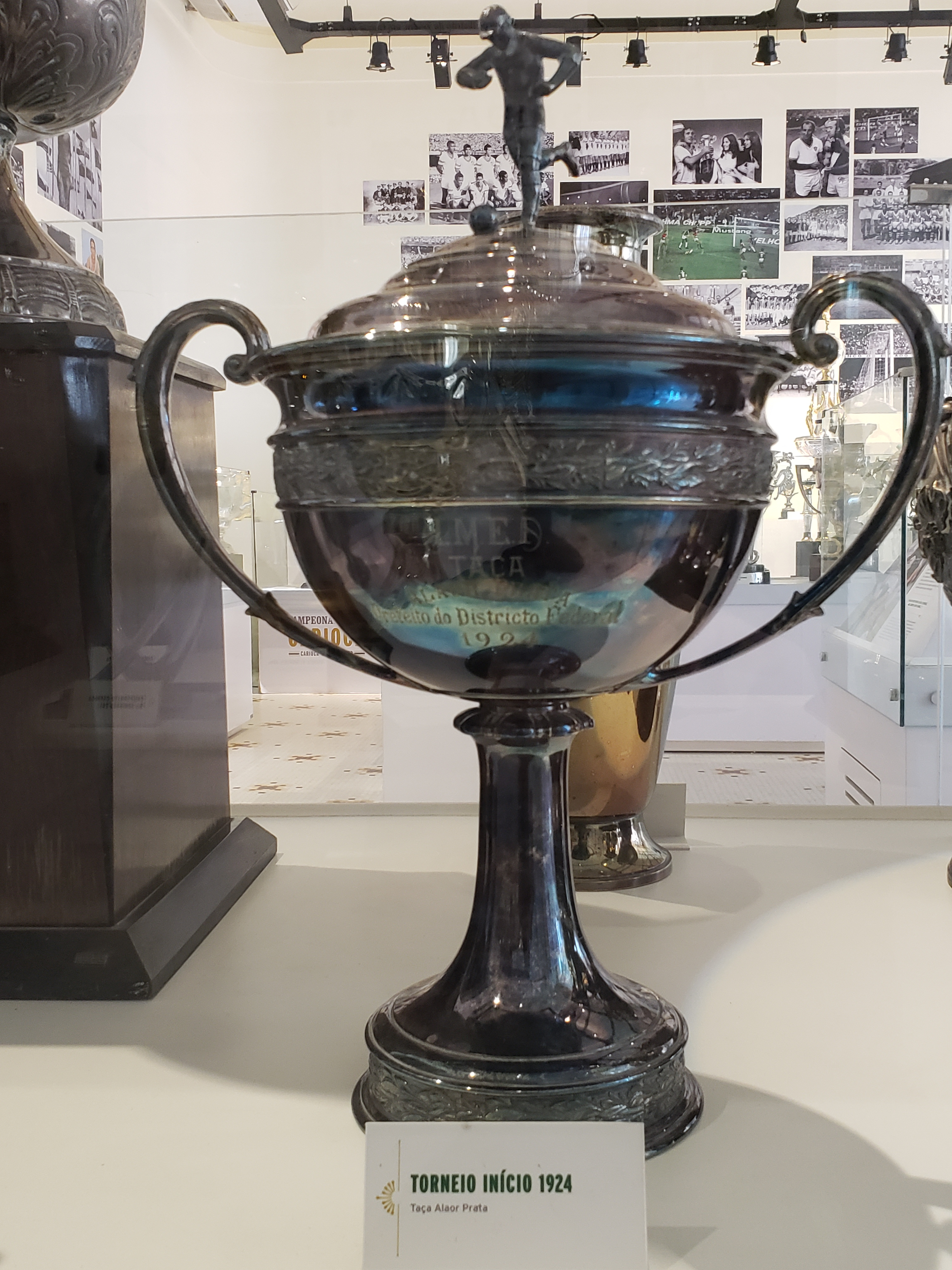
The 1924 Torneio Início Cup.

During their successful campaign in the 1924 Carioca Championship, the Tricolor achieved 12 victories, one draw and one defeat. They scored 54 goals and conceded 19, with Nilo scoring 28 of those goals. The team also won the Torneio Início that year, defeating Flamengo in the final.

=== 1925–1934: The first international cups, a fatal accident and the beginning of the professional era ===
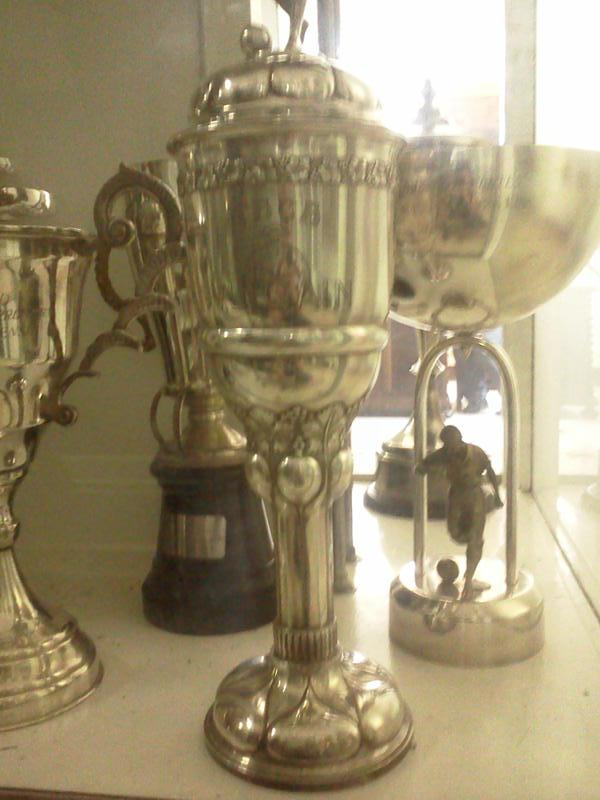
The 1924 Vulcain Cup.

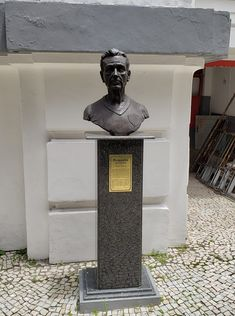
Bust of Preguinho.

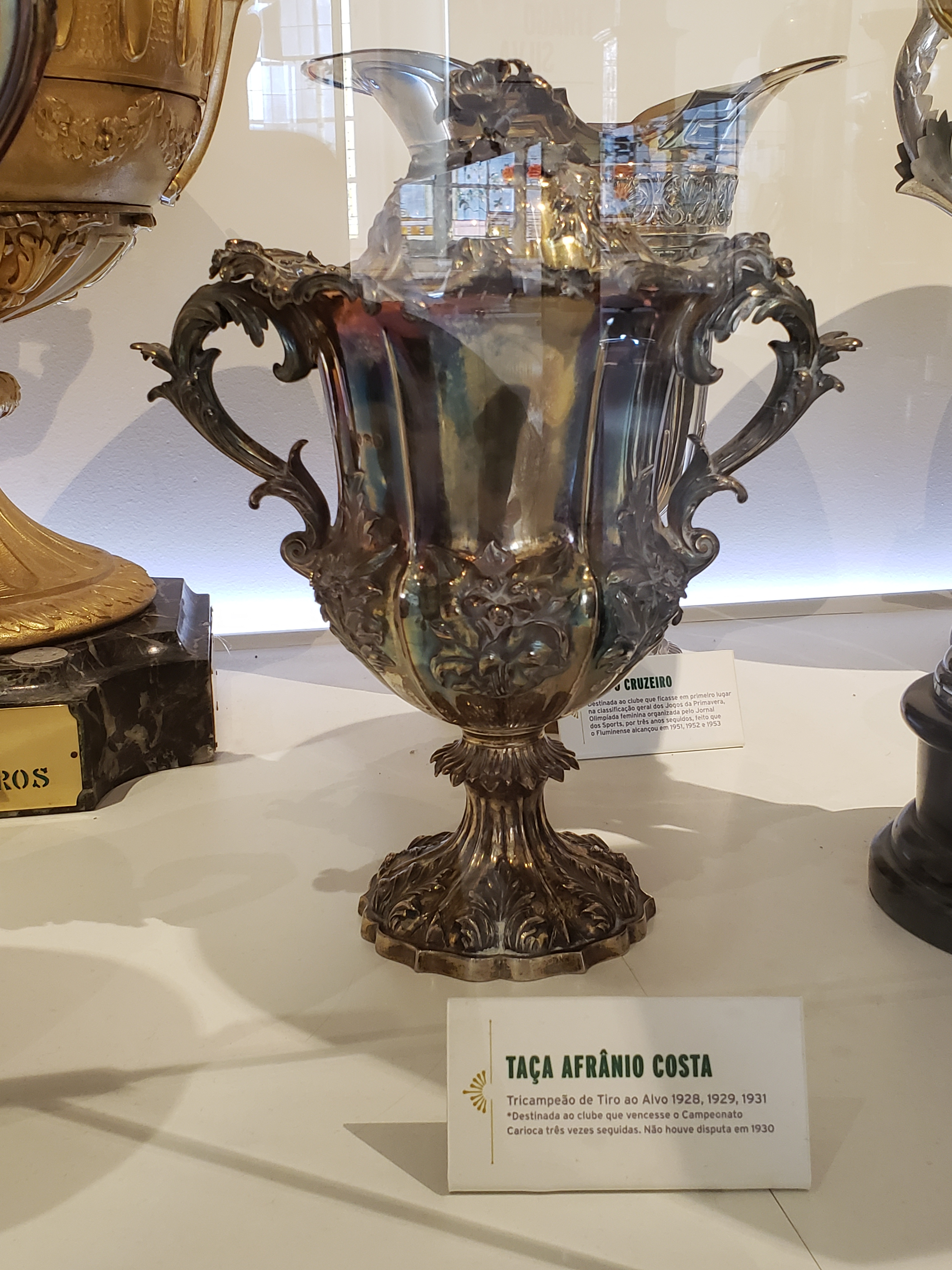
The Afrânio Costa Shooting Cup, awarded to the three-time champion in 1931.

Despite not winning as many relevant football titles in this period, at a time when São Cristóvão and Bangu emerged as competitors, along with America, Botafogo, Flamengo, and Vasco da Gama, Fluminense finished as runners-up in the state championship in 1925, 1927 and 1935. They also won the Torneio Início in 1925 and 1927. They consistently performed well during this period, with their worst placement being fifth in 1934.

The attendance record for a paid match at the Estádio de Laranjeiras was set on 14 June 1925 during the Fluminense vs. Flamengo match, when 25,718 spectators paid to attend. However, the attendance for Fluminense's match against Sporting Clube de Portugal in 1928 is unknown. Also in 1925, on 17 May, 22,476 spectators paid to watch a match against Vasco da Gama. Regarding the match on 22 November, the newspaper O Globo estimated that 30,000 people were present at another match against the cruzmaltinos, which ended in a 5–1 victory for Fluminense.

São Cristóvão won the 1926 Carioca Championship decisively, losing only two of eighteen games. However, on 18 April, Fluminense striker Nilo scored a hat-trick and Coelho scored twice, while Alfredinho scored once, securing a 6–2 victory against São Cristóvão.

On 15 July 1928, Fluminense played a friendly against Sporting Clube de Portugal at their stadium, with the Tricolor winning 4–1. Notably, this was the first time that the major Portuguese club wore their traditional uniform of horizontal green and white stripes, and Fluminense won their first international cup, the Vulcain Cup, in front of a packed Estádio das Laranjeiras crowd. To meet the huge public demand, Flu placed an additional 2,000 chairs on the athletics track. People wanted to watch the Tricolor take on a major representative of a country that, until 106 years earlier, had colonised Brazil. The match featured great demonstrations of patriotism, including military band parades, as well as reciprocal tributes between the clubs involved. Fourteen days later, Fluminense won their second international cup against Sporting again, this time with a score of 3–2. However, attendance was slightly lower due to the rain that day.

The Estádio de Laranjeiras was fitted with artificial lighting on 21 June 1928. It was inaugurated with a match between the Rio de Janeiro state football team and the Scottish club Motherwell.

On 8 September 1929, at the official inauguration of Campo da Alameda in the city of Belo Horizonte, Fluminense won the Dom Pedro II and Torcedoras do América FC cups against América, the runner-up in Minas Gerais, who had been ten-time state champions a few years earlier.

On 9 March 1930, a serious train accident occurred while Fluminense were returning from a friendly match against a team from Teresópolis. The defender Jorge Tavares Py was killed when he tried to activate the wagon brakes to minimise the effects of the accident, and all the other Fluminense players were injured. Nevertheless, honouring their commitment, the club fulfilled their obligations that year despite only achieving average results in their games.

At the 1930 FIFA World Cup, Preguinho, the first captain of the Brazilian National Team in a FIFA World Cup, also scored the first Brazilian goal in this competition.

In 1933, Fluminense played a key role in the professionalisation of Brazilian football. This resulted in strong reactions, with several clubs opposing it. This caused divisions within leagues between professionals and amateurs in some Brazilian states before the professionalisation process was definitively implemented throughout the country.

=== 1935–1949: Supremacy, other titles, and war effort ===
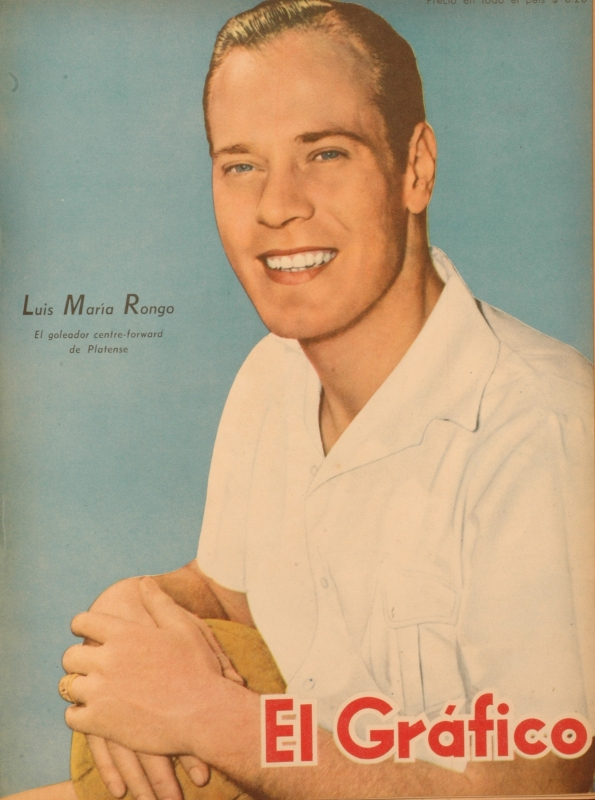
Rongo, an Argentinian striker who played for the club.

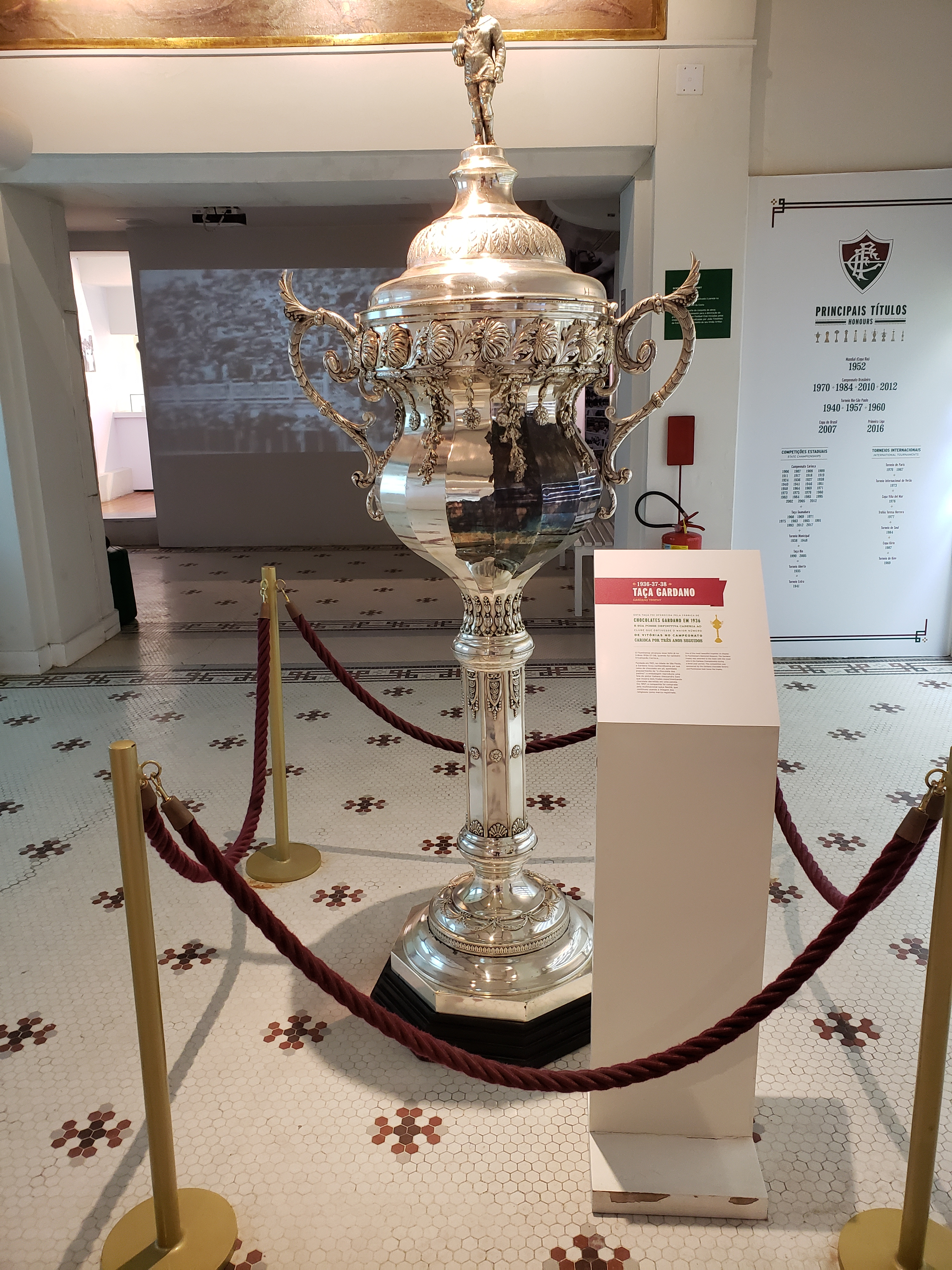
The Gardano Cup was contested between Fluminense and Flamengo from 1936 to 1938.

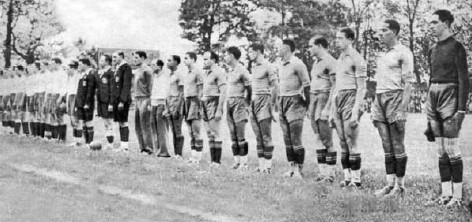
The Brazilian national team at the 1938 World Cup.

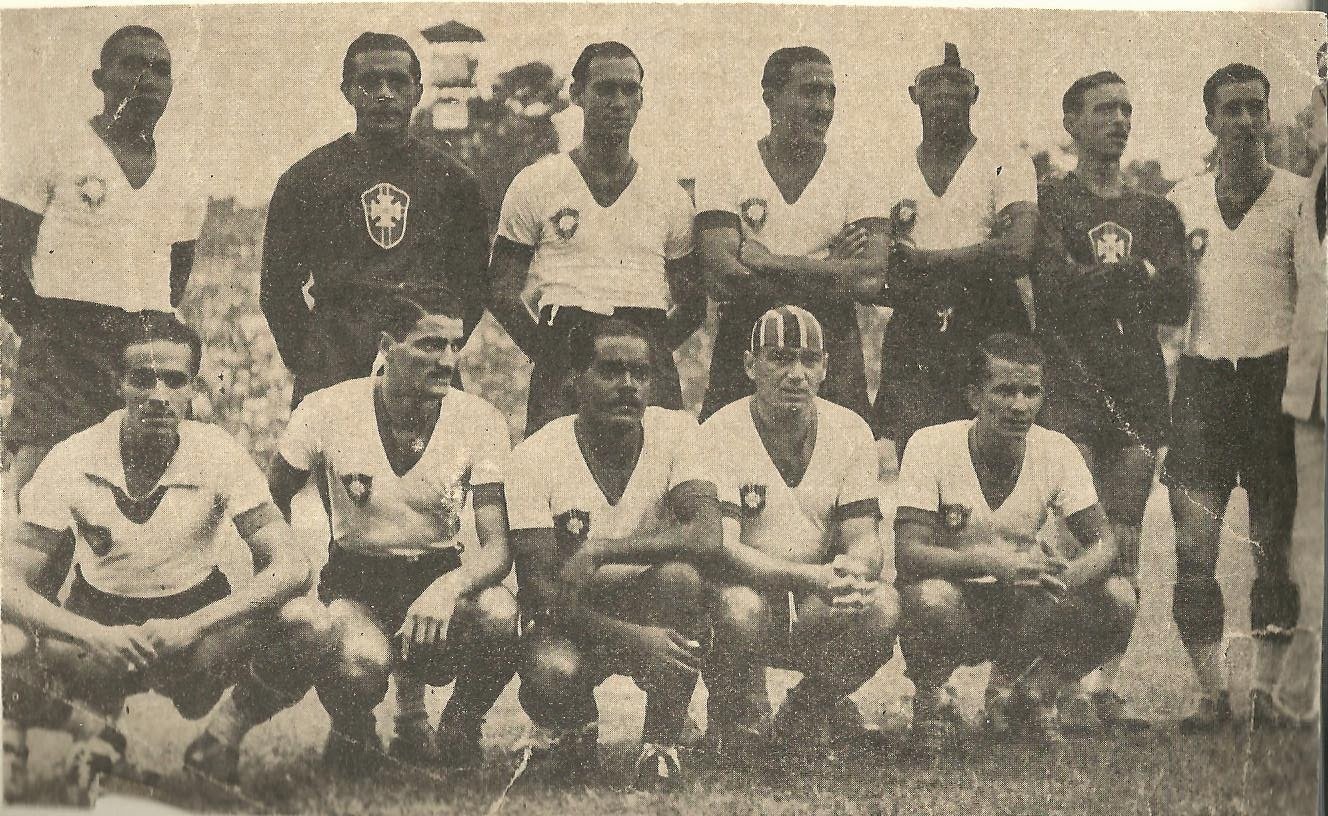
The Tricolor players who made up the Brazilian national team in 1940. Romeu is wearing a Tricolor cap.

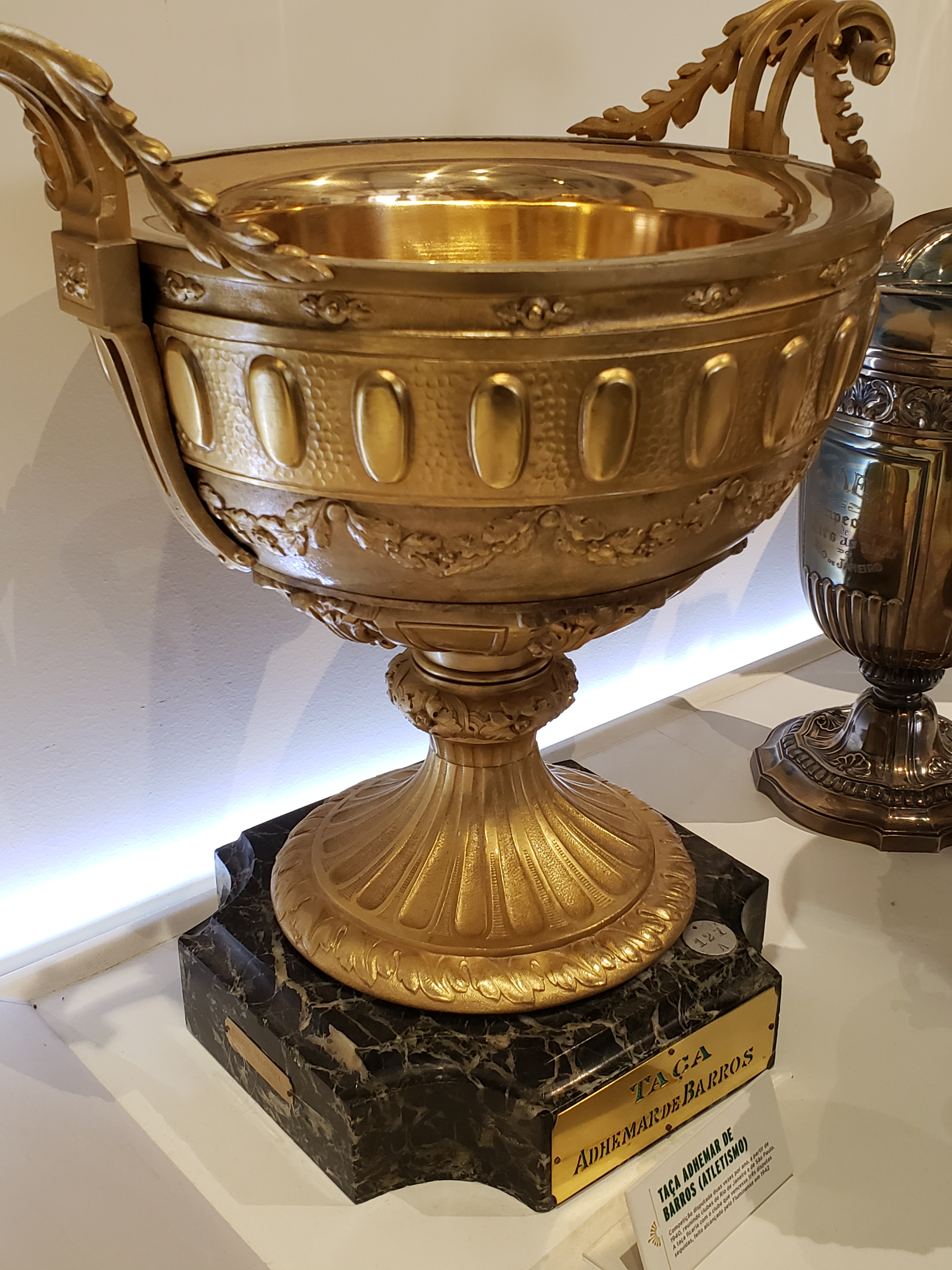
Ademar de Barros Athletics Cup (RJ vs. SP), 1942.

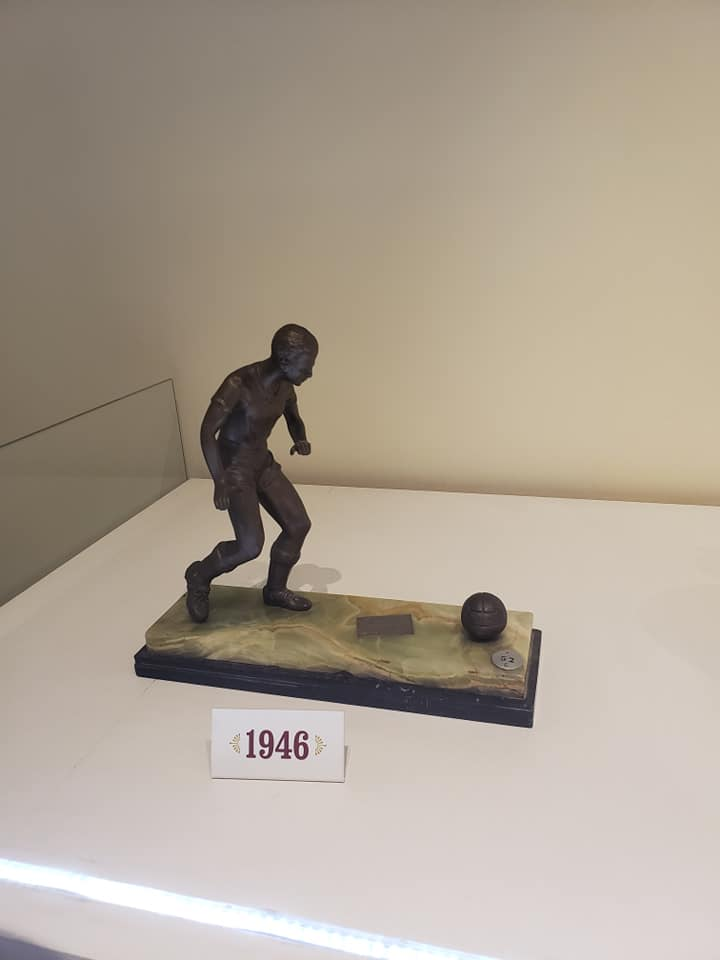
1946 Carioca Championship Cup.

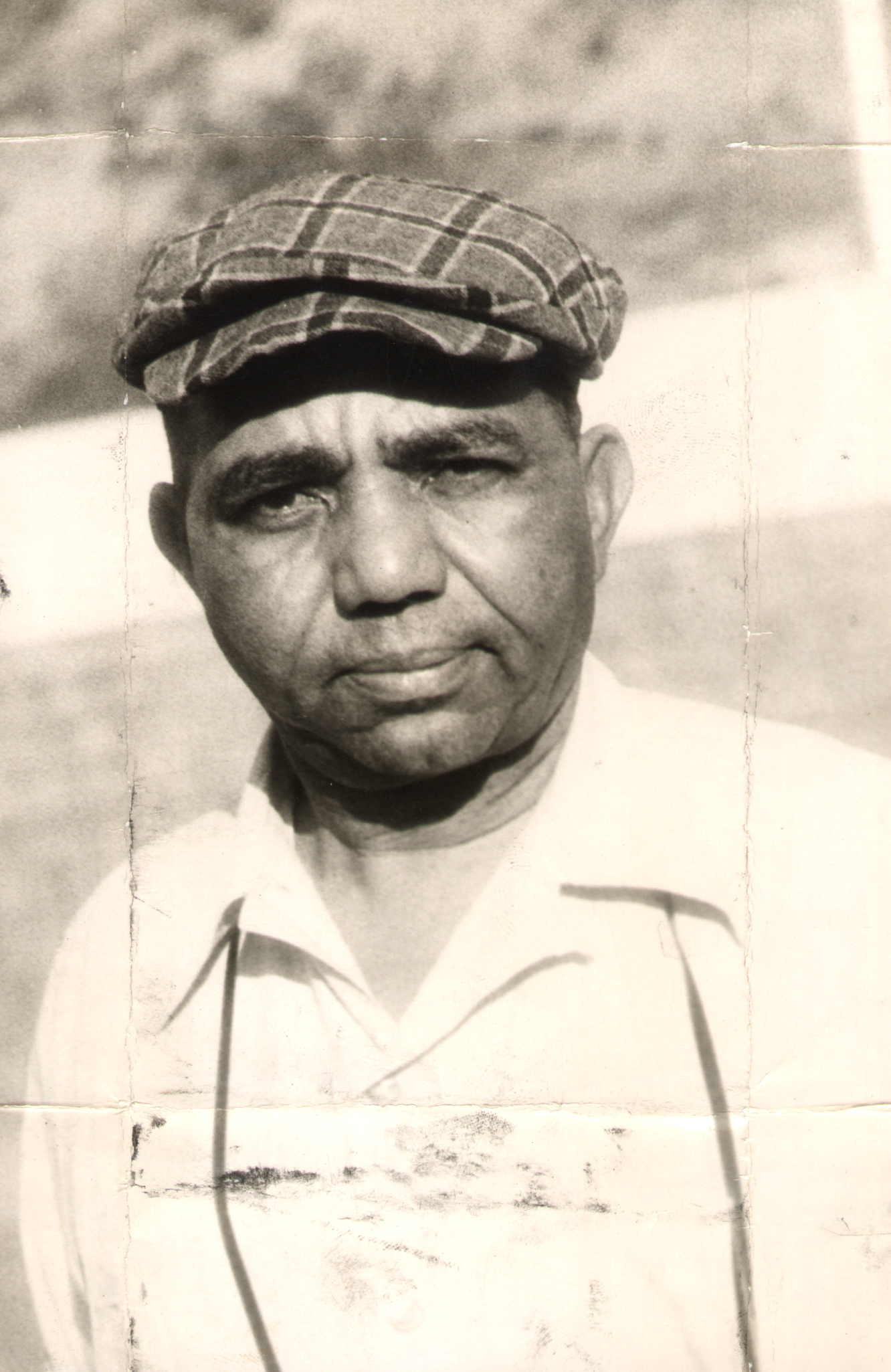
Gentil Cardoso, 1946 Rio de Janeiro champion.

In 1935, Fluminense signed 11 players from the São Paulo state football team which was two-time champion of the Campeonato Brasileiro de Seleções Estaduais, the main football competition for decades in Brazil. Not satisfied, over the years, other players of various origins joined the Paulistas, such as Brant, Russo, Hércules, Pedro Amorim, Carreiro, and the Argentine striker Rongo (who previously played for River Plate), forming one of the best teams in its history.

In 1935, Fluminense won the Rio de Janeiro Open Tournament, a competition open to both professional and amateur teams, by defeating America 3–1 in the final. At this time, there were two Rio football leagues: one professional, led by Fluminense; and one amateur, led by Botafogo. Botafogo became the four-time Carioca champion, winning three titles in the other league — the only major team to do so. The Open Tournament provided an opportunity for teams from both leagues to compete against each other and was an attempt by professional clubs to attract amateurs. This ultimately occurred in 1937 with the unification of Carioca football, which resulted in the termination of the Open Tournament that year while Fluminense was in the lead.

In the penultimate round of matches of the 1935 Carioca Championship, Fluminense were beating America 5-4. Towards the end of the match, the red team scored two goals, overturning the result and virtually securing the title. They went on to beat Portuguesa 4-0 and draw with Flamengo 1-1 in the final rounds. After beating Modesto 4–0 and Portuguesa 5–3, Fluminense finished the championship as runners-up, just one point behind America. From then on, Fluminense's victories followed one after another.

Between 1935 and 1941, Fluminense dominated their opponents. Boasting a team full of exceptional talent, they won the Open Tournament, five Carioca championships, one Extra Tournament and one Municipal Tournament. They also won two Torneio Início titles in 1940 and 1941, and performed exceptionally well in interstate friendlies and the 1940 Torneio Rio-São Paulo, in which they were leading before the Paulista clubs withdrew.

Between 1936 and 1941, Fluminense achieved 90 victories, 21 draws and 21 defeats (eight of which were in 1939, an atypical year), scoring 410 goals (106 of which were in 1941 — a record in the history of the Carioca Championship) and conceding 187 (44 of which were in 1939). In 1939, the team's poor performance was attributed to the fact that many of its players were in the Brazil squad that lost to two-time champions Italy in the 1938 FIFA World Cup. The Fluminense players, who formed the core of this national team, would have returned emotionally shaken after losing, and this may have affected their motivation the following year. This was also a time when Italian immigrants and their descendants, as well as Germans and Japanese, suffered persecution and discrimination in much of Brazil due to World War II.

Seven years after the founding of the Army School of Physical Education in 1937, its Specialization Course in Sports Medicine graduated the first physician in that specialty, Fluminense forward Vicentino, who ended up abandoning his career as a football player to dedicate himself to sports medicine, creating in 1937 the Medical Services Section of Fluminense Football Club.

In the quest to triumph in the 1938 Municipal Tournament, Fluminense, in 16 games, obtained 11 victories, 1 draw, and 4 defeats, with 39 goals for and 18 against, becoming champions in the penultimate round by defeating Bonsucesso 6–0. Also in 1938, Fluminense created the Tricolor Olympics, an internal competition in various sports involving athletes and members of the Tricolor.

In the 1941 Extra Tournament, Fluminense were champions by defeating São Cristóvão 2–1 at the Estádio Figueira de Melo, in the penultimate round. In 9 games, Fluminense obtained 8 victories and only 1 defeat (against America, 2–1, in the final round), with forty goals for (an average of 4.4 goals per match) and 13 against.

The Fla-Flu da Lagoa, as the final match of the 1941 Campeonato Carioca became known, in which Fluminense players at the end of the match kicked the balls into the Rodrigo de Freitas Lagoon, which before being landfilled was next to the Estádio da Gávea, was the subject of recent controversy, as researchers claimed they could not find references to these cases in newspapers of the time, but besides the many witnesses who guaranteed that the supposed legend was true, the facts are published in O Globo Esportivo, edition 171 of 1941, page 5.

Fluminense established a School of Military Instruction in October 1937 which during the years 1940 and 1941 achieved first place in efficiency and discipline in the entire Federal District and prepared a nursing course in 1942 to assist the soldiers of the Brazilian Expeditionary Force who would later land in Italy. 85 nurses were graduated from the course, and an airplane was donated to the Brazilian Air Force, named Coelho Netto.

After this exceptional phase, Flu were Carioca runners-up in 1943 and 1949, third in 1942 and fourth in 1944 and 1945. In the year 1943, they were champions of the Torneio Início, beating Madureira in the final.

In 1946, they won the Campeonato Carioca after, at the end of the tournament, four teams finished tied, requiring a final phase called the Superchampionship to decide the title. The tricolor team did not draw even once in the initial phase of this championship, obtaining 13 victories and 5 defeats, with 74 goals for and 36 against. In the Superchampionship, they obtained 5 victories and 1 draw, 23 goals for and 9 against. The star of the championship was striker Ademir de Menezes. The final match was against Botafogo. Fluminense won 1–0 in front of 35,000 spectators (27,094 of whom paid) at the São Januário stadium. Ademir scored the winning goal. A tricolor fan since childhood in Recife, Ademir proclaimed his passion for the team through the microphones of Rádio Nacional at the end of his career.

The tricolor's second conquest of the Municipal Tournament happened in 1948, with 3 extra games needed to decide the champion. In the first match, Fluminense defeated Vasco 4–0 at the Estádio General Severiano, lost the second at Gávea 2–1 and won the deciding match 1–0, with a goal by Orlando Pingo de Ouro, a bicycle kick, again at Gen. Severiano. In 13 games, Flu obtained 8 victories, 4 draws and only 1 defeat, with 31 goals for and 14 against. Still in the year 1948, Fluminense defeated Racing 3–2 at Laranjeiras, winning the Taça Departamento de Imprensa Esportiva. The team also finished as the runners-up in the 1949 Carioca tournament.

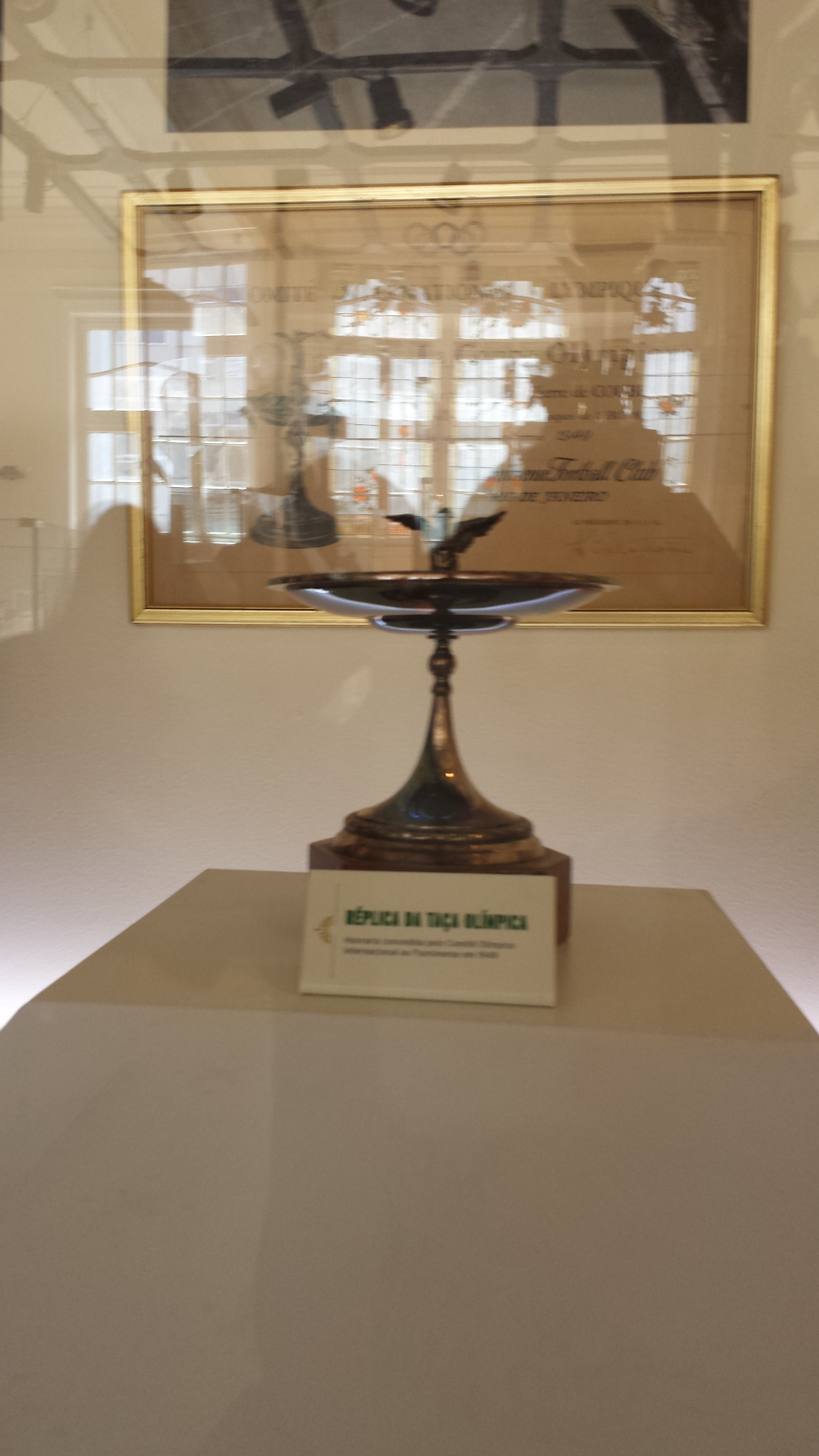
Replica of the 1949 Olympic Cup.

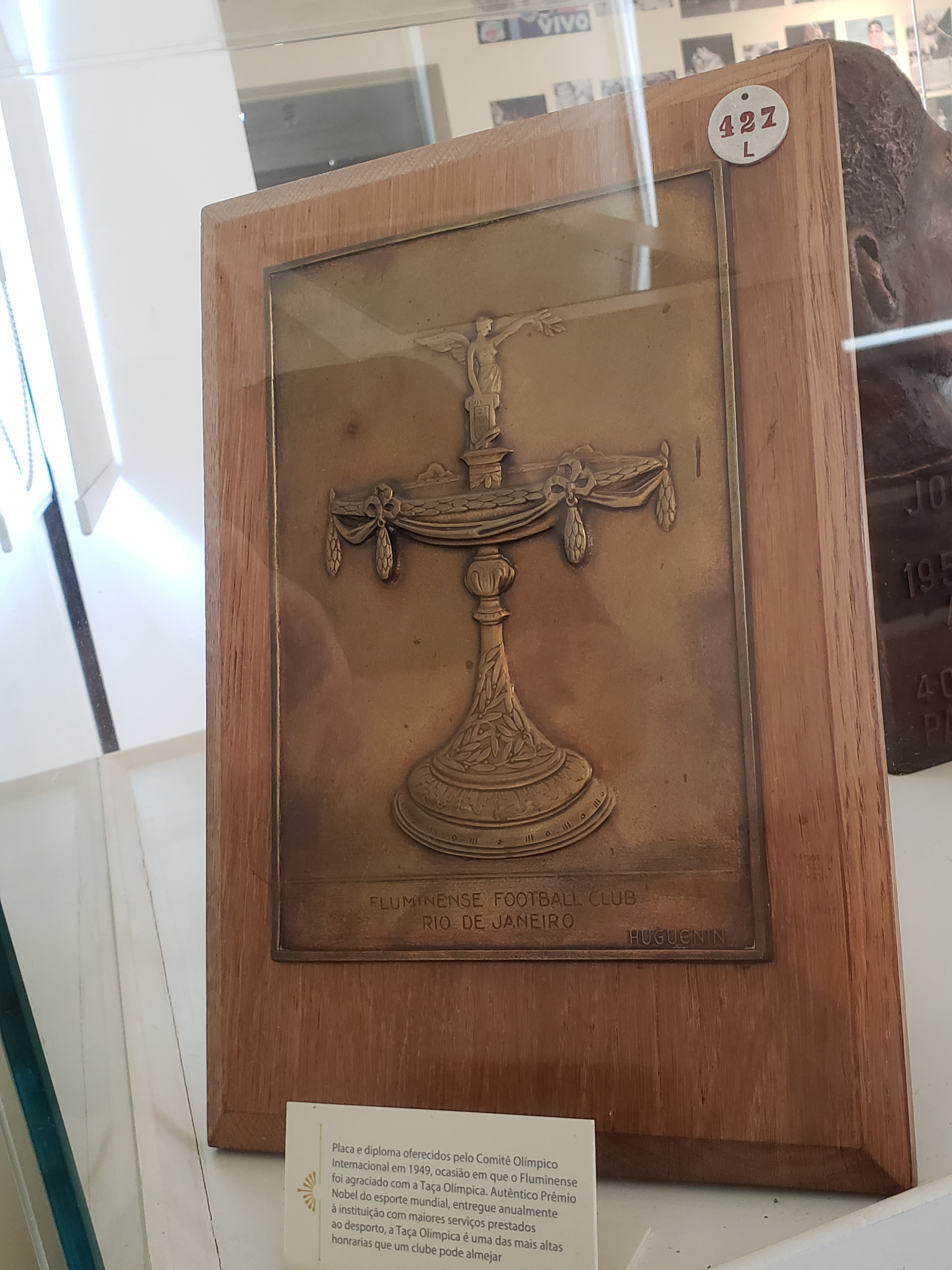
Plaque granted by the IOC.

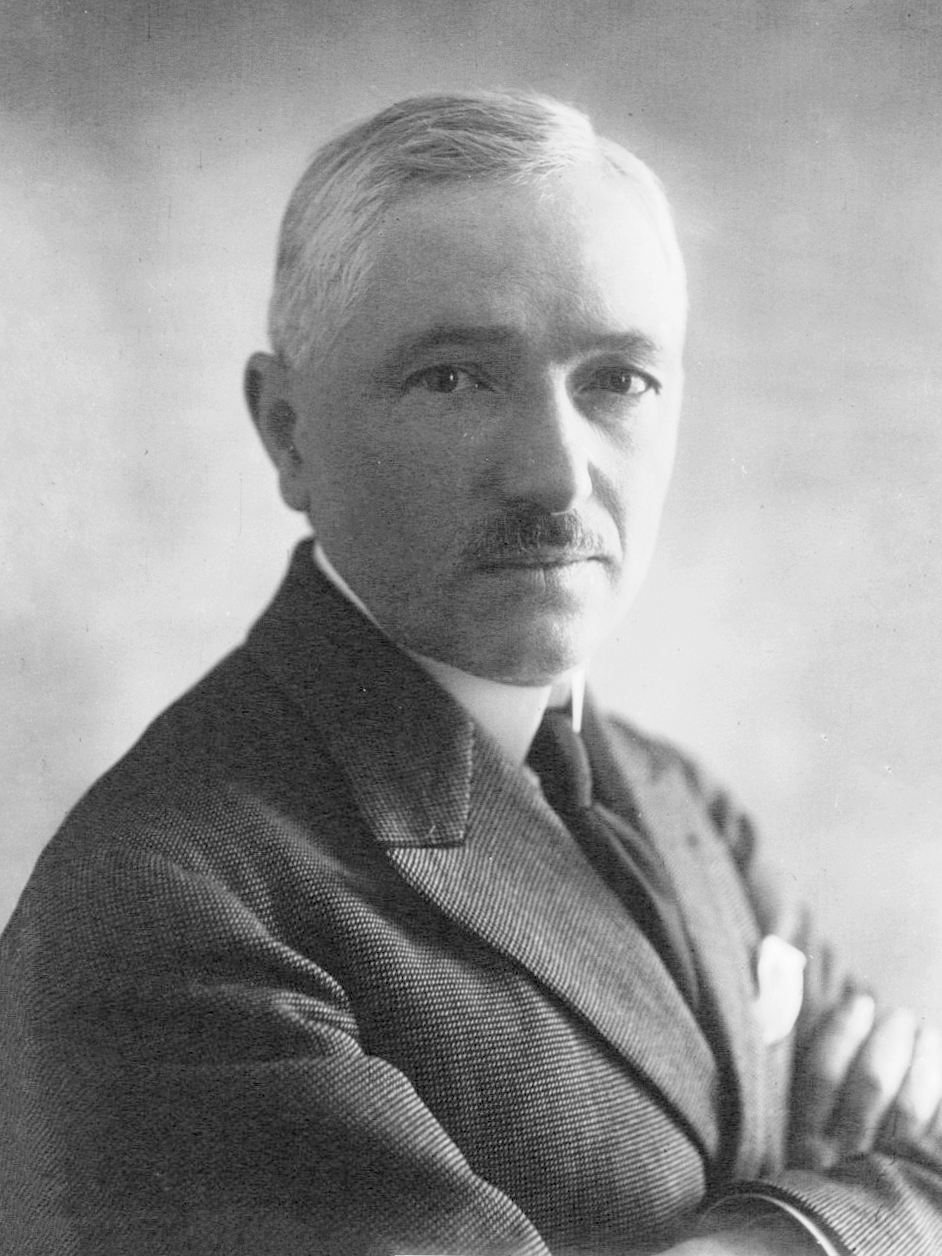
Jules Rimet.

=== The Path to the Olympic Cup ===
As early as 1924, the Fluminense Football Club was aware of the conditions required of candidates. The club sent ample documentation to the IOC, including information about the 1922 Latin American Olympic Games. This event was one of the precursors to the Pan American Games. It took place in the club's new facilities, which were specially expanded for this purpose. Arnaldo Guinle was the president at the time.

The Committee was meeting in Paris, when the Minister Paulo do Rio Branco, representing Brazil at the meeting, communicated Fluminense's candidacy to obtain the Cup in the period 1926/1927, in recognition of the excellent organization of the 1922 Games. Without the support of Baron Pierre de Coubertin, the club was unsuccessful.

The club made another attempt to register in 1936, and a new dossier was sent to the IOC, this time meeting in Berlin, seat of the XI Olympiad, but the trophy was awarded to another institution. With the war that spread across all continents, Fluminense interrupted the work begun in 1924.

In 1948, on the occasion of the XIV Olympic Games in London, a new registration was requested. Fluminense competed with the Sport and Recreation Alliance, but the delegate withdrew the Tricolor's candidacy so that the prize could be unanimously granted to the Olympiad hosts. The club renewed its proposal for the following year.

Finally, on 28 April 1949 came the news of the decision taken by the International Olympic Committee meeting in Rome: the club had won the Olympic Cup of 1949. On the occasion of the presentation made by the IOC, Jules Rimet said: "Fluminense is the most perfect sports organization in the world."

Fluminense is the only club in Latin America to have its name inscribed on the Olympic Cup to this day. The Olympic Museum in Lausanne (Switzerland), where the original cup is on permanent display, was built on the shores of Lake Geneva, by two architects - the Mexican Pedro Ramírez Vázquez and the French Jean-Pierre Cohen.

=== 1950–1952: Maracanã Era and the unprecedented conquest of the 1952 Copa Rio ===
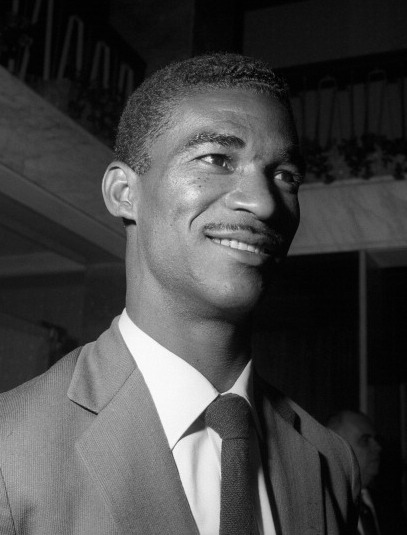
Didi was part of the winning teams of 1951 and 1952.

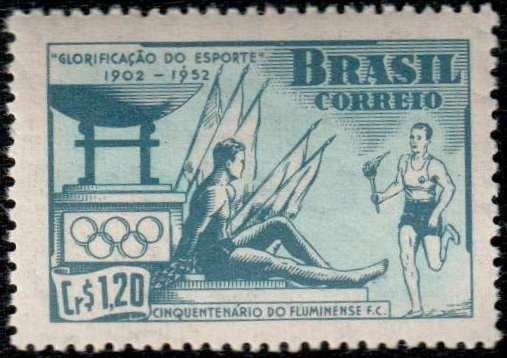
Stamp commemorating the fiftieth anniversary.

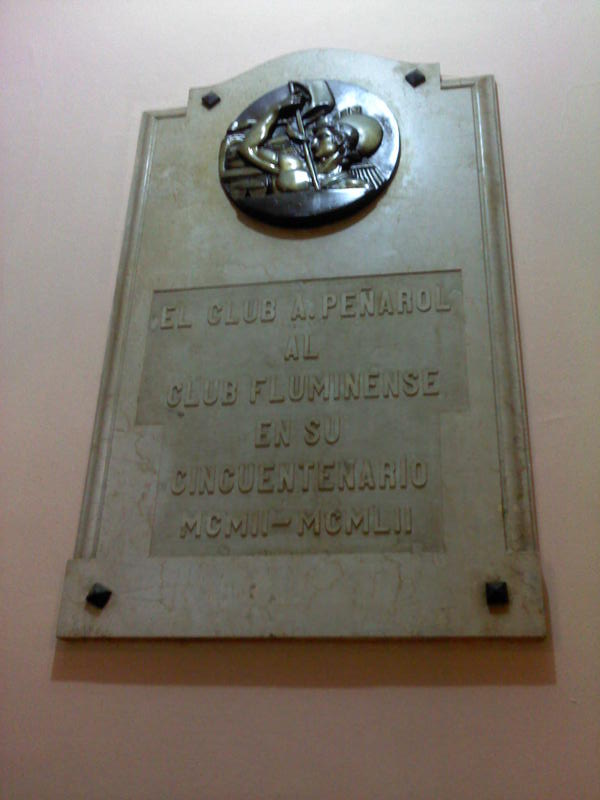
Tribute from Peñarol to the fiftieth anniversary.

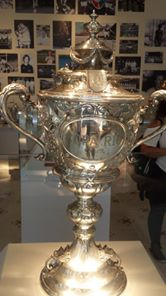
Trophy of the 1952 Copa Rio.

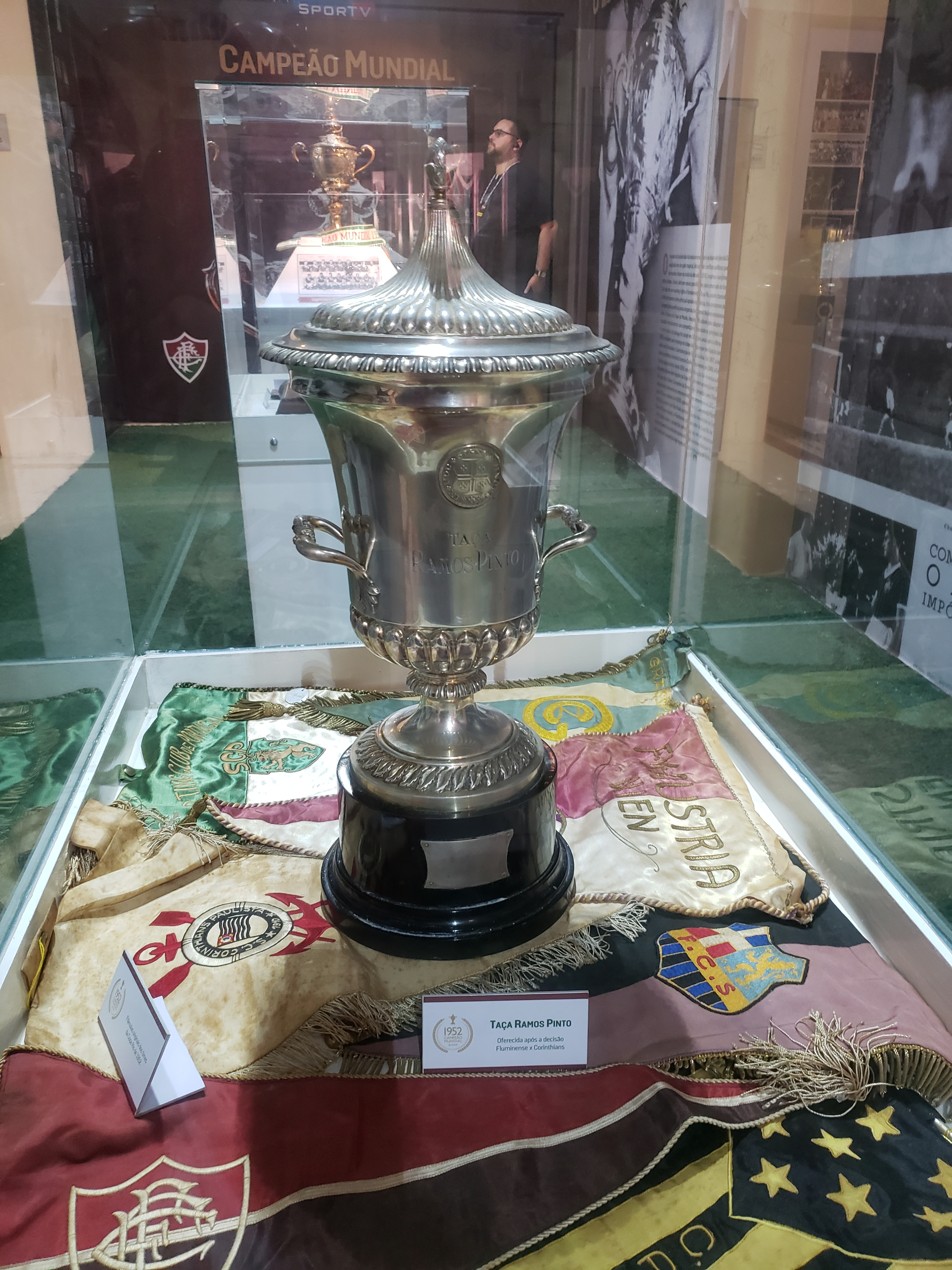
1952 Ramos Pinto Trophy.

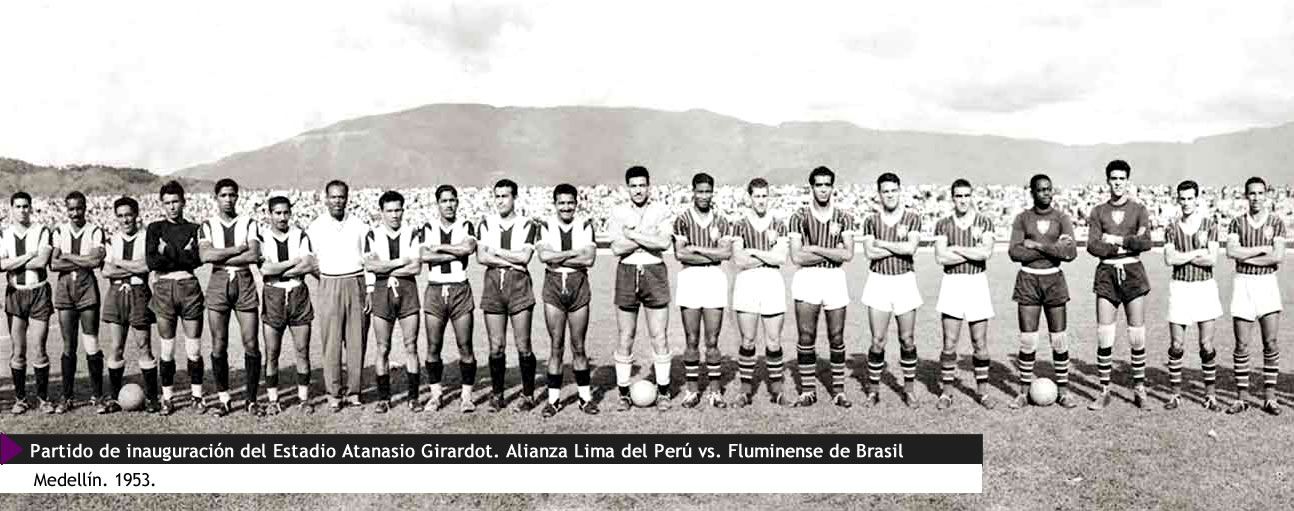
Fluminense 2–2 Alianza Lima, inauguration tournament of the Atanasio Girardot Stadium, in 1953.

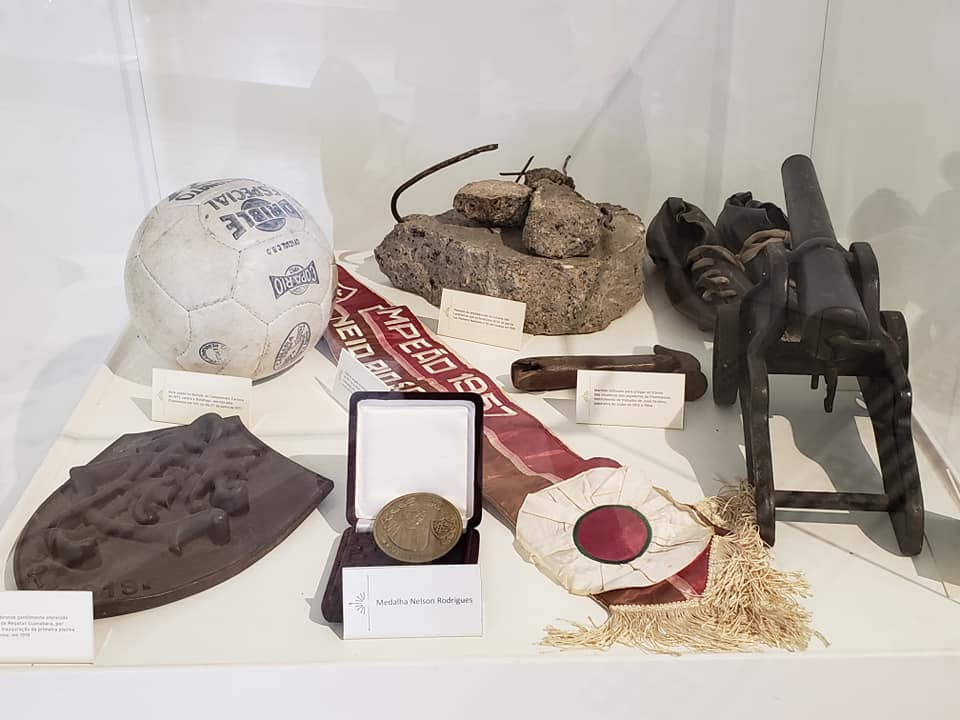
Commemorative items from the 1957 Torneio Rio-São Paulo.

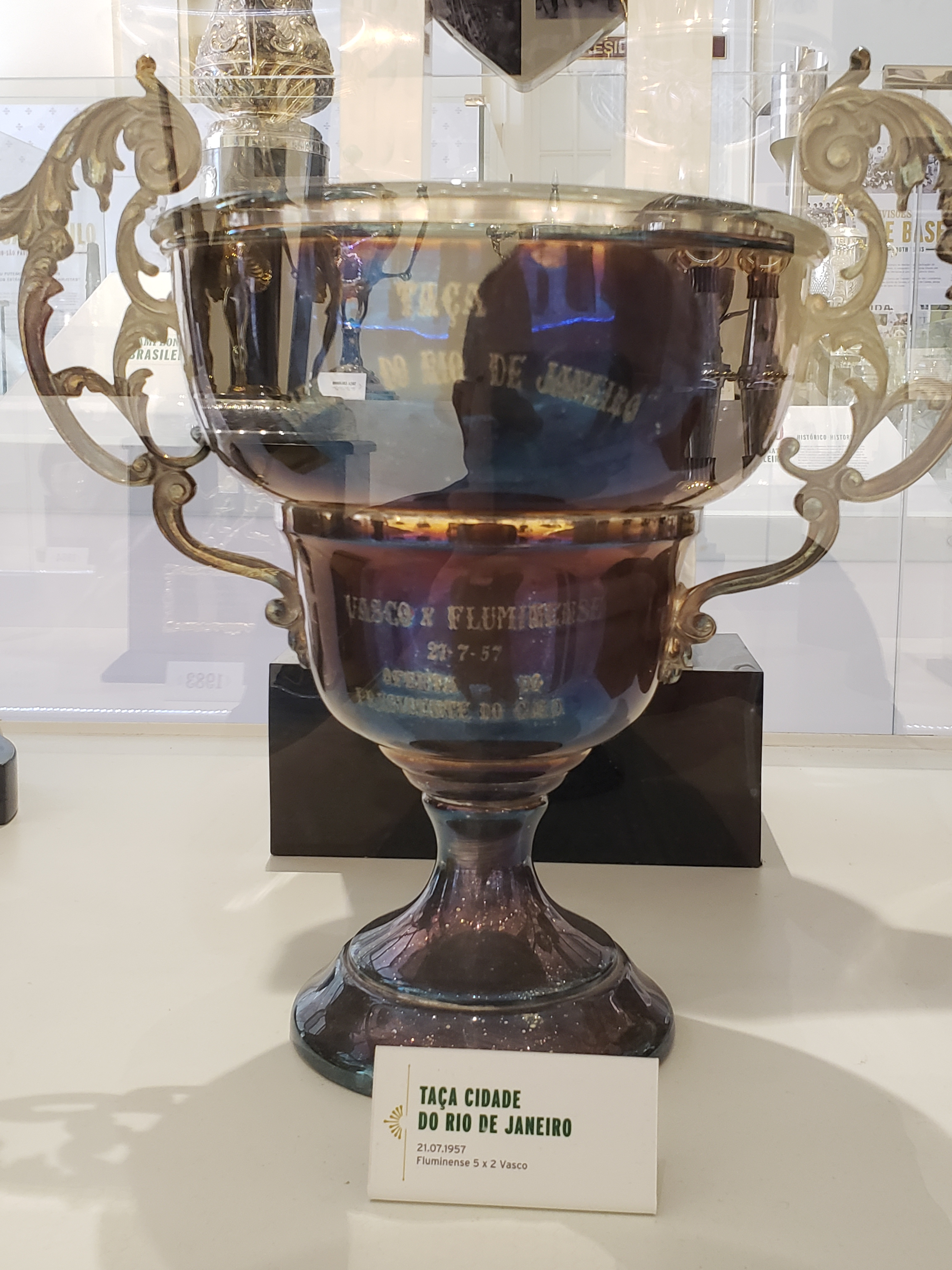
1957 City of Rio de Janeiro Trophy.

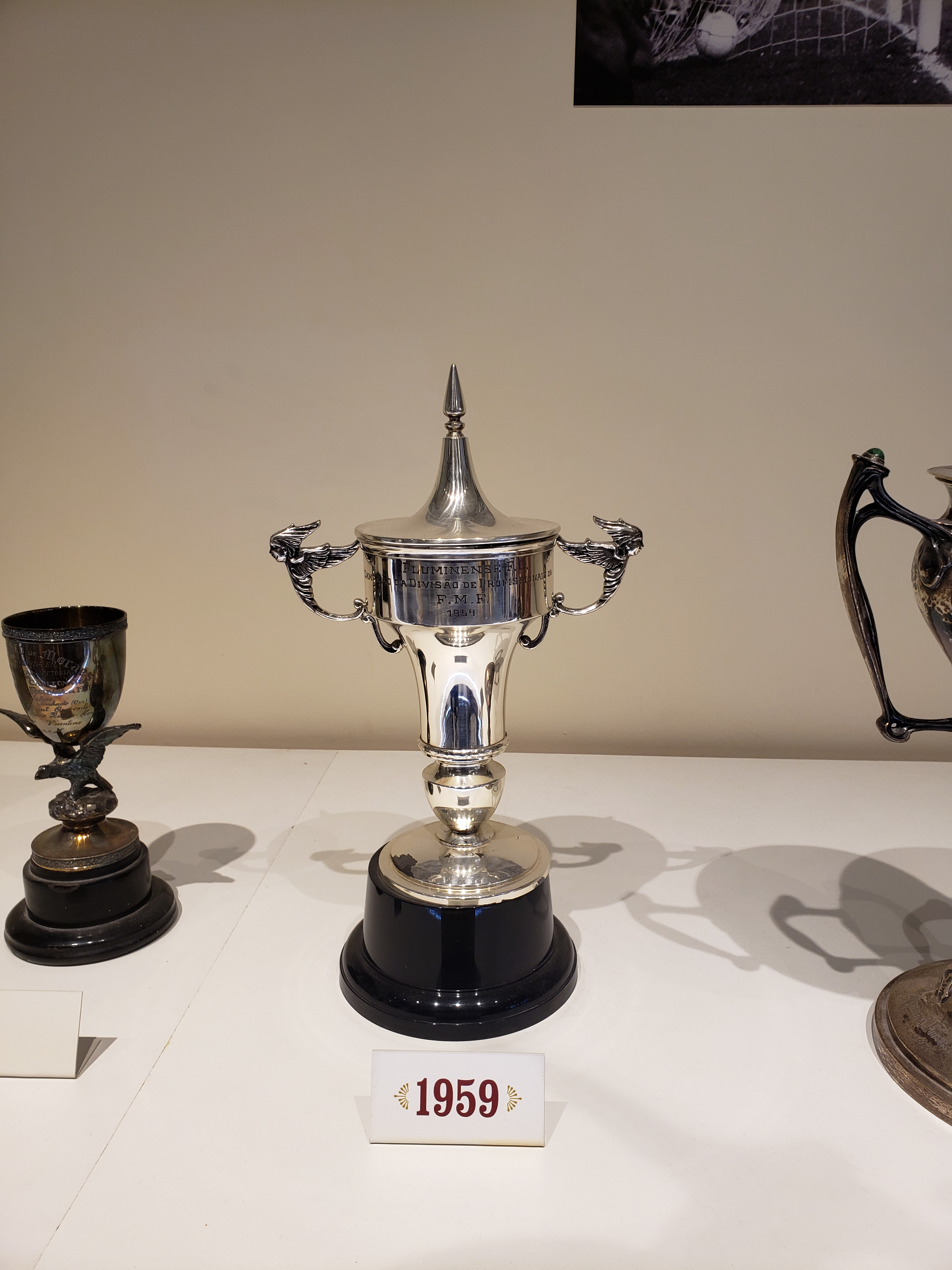
Trophy of the 1959 Campeonato Carioca.

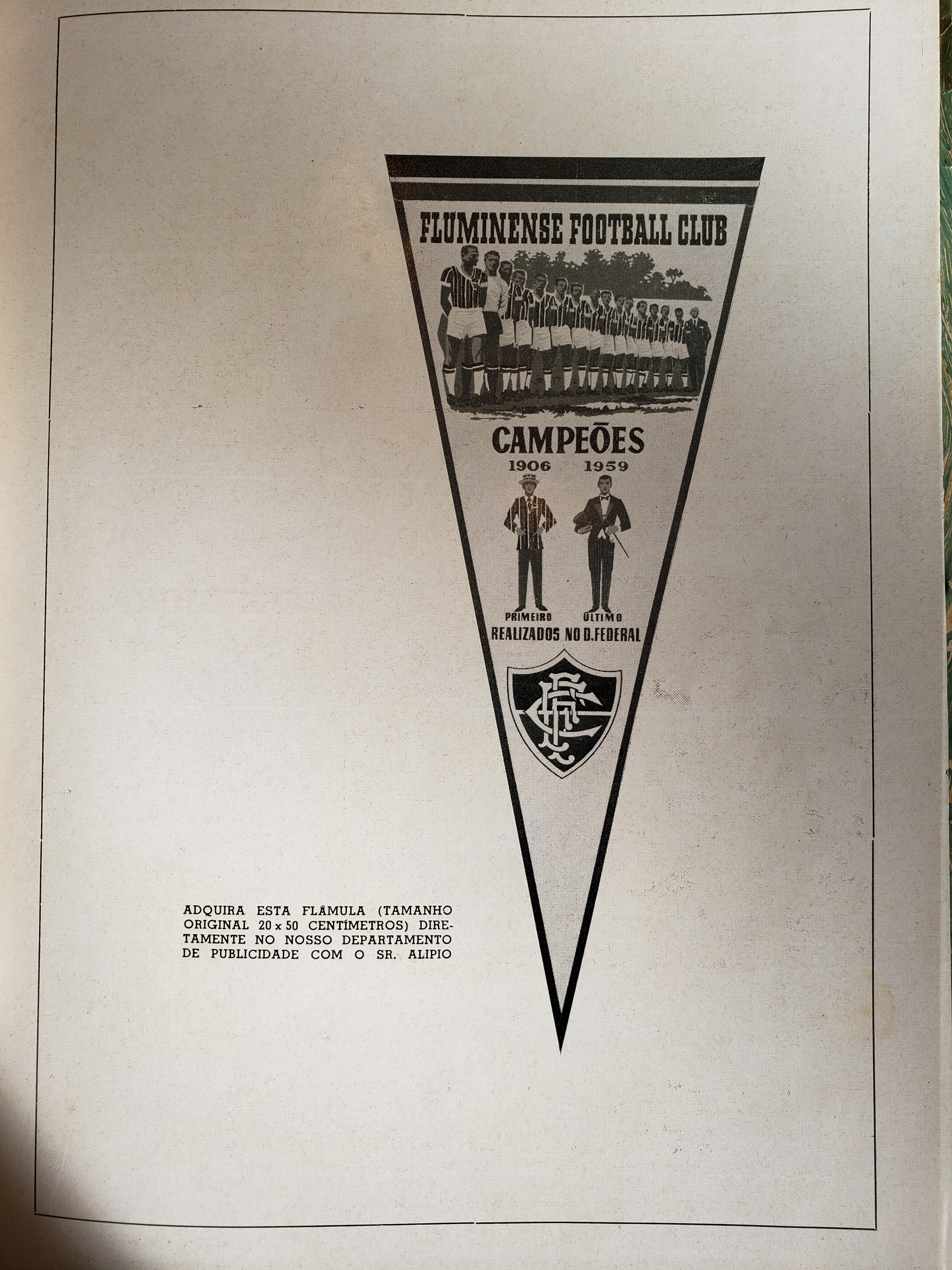
Pennant of the 1959 Campeonato Carioca.

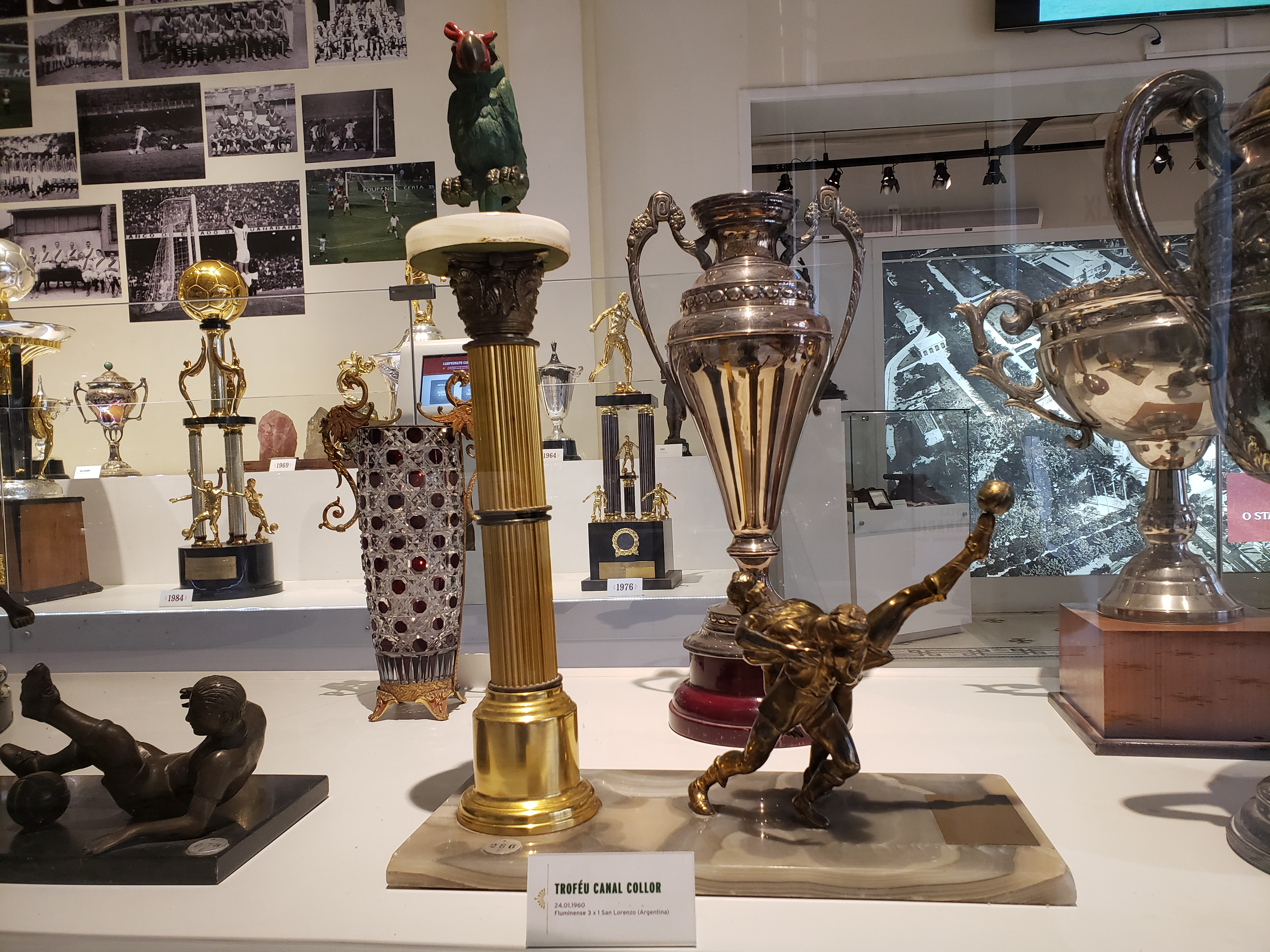
1960 Canal Collor Trophy, won against San Lorenzo.

In 1950, Fluminense had a very poor Campeonato Carioca, although they won all the first derbies played in the Maracanã, except the one played against America, finishing this championship in 6th place. In the first half of the year, Flu made a victorious tour through countries of Latin America and Central America, with Didi being the first player to score a goal at the Maracanã, playing for the Rio de Janeiro state football team, on 16 June 1950.

Fluminense conquered, in the second year of the Maracanã Stadium, the Carioca title, by defeating Bangu in the two extra games. The last three games (including the one for the final round of the return leg) against Bangu brought no less than 232,006 spectators to the Maracanã, in a championship with a large audience, which provided new revenue and investment parameters for Carioca football. In the 1951 championship, Flu obtained 16 victories, 3 draws, 3 defeats, 54 goals for and 22 goals against.

That year, the first Fla-Flu at the Maracanã that lived up to the title of the Crowd's Derby was played. On October 14, 1951, Fluminense defeated Flamengo 1–0 in front of 109,212 spectators (94,558 of whom were paid attendees). The game was marked by a large number of counterfeit tickets, which, according to the press, allowed more than 40,000 additional spectators into the stadium.

Still in 1951, Fluminense played two friendlies at the Maracanã against touring English teams, namely against Arsenal, which Fluminense defeated 2–0 on 20 May in front of 43,746 spectators (35,010 of whom were paid attendees) and against Portsmouth on 3 June, when Flu won 2–1 with an audience of 45,244 spectators, 37,935 of whom were paid attendees.

Between 1910 and 1951, Fluminense played 44 international games, with seventeen victories, 12 draws and 15 defeats, with one hundred goals for and 103 against. In the same period, Fluminense played 298 interstate matches, achieving 159 victories, 58 draws, and 81 defeats. They scored 821 goals and allowed 513.

From September 12 to 22, 1951, the first South American Volleyball Championship took place at the Fluminense Gymnasium. The Brazilian national team won both the men's and women's categories.

On March 30, 1952, Fluminense arrived at the final round of the Rio-São Paulo tournament as the leaders. They needed only to defeat Corinthians in São Paulo to become champions without depending on other results. However, after losing 4–2, Portuguesa later became champions.

In April of the same year, the Brazil national football team would win its first official title outside its borders by winning the Panamerican Championship in Chile. Fluminense contributed to this victory by providing coach Zezé Moreira and players Castilho, Pinheiro, and Didi, who were all starters, as well as reserve Bigode.

Between the end of June and the beginning of July, Fluminense competed in the Torneio José de Paula Júnior against América-MG, Atlético-MG and Cruzeiro, becoming champions. Fluminense finished tied with Cruzeiro for first place, but earned the right to keep the title as the visiting club. Still, Fluminense offered Cruzeiro a playoff match to decide the title.

In the month of July, with the final match taking place on 2 August, the second edition of the Copa Rio was contested by eight clubs, in Rio de Janeiro and São Paulo, one of the precursor competitions of the FIFA Club World Cup. The final match took place on August 2, with Fluminense becoming champion by drawing 2–2 with Corinthians, having already won the first match of the finals 2–0. The most notable result of this competition was the 3–0 victory over Peñarol, the team that formed the core of the Uruguayan national football team which won the 1950 FIFA World Cup. About 65,000 spectators attended the match at the Maracanã Stadium.

In this competition, Fluminense played 7 games, with five victories and 2 draws (in the first and last game, against Sporting and Corinthians respectively), with fourteen goals for and only 4 goals against. Marinho and Orlando Pingo de Ouro were not only Fluminense's top scorers, but also the top scorers of the competition, each scoring five goals. This was the first significant conquest of a Carioca club at the Maracanã in a tournament involving clubs from outside Rio de Janeiro.

The 1953 Anuário do Esporte Ilustrado published an article about the end of the Copa Rio that read, "One detail that ended up defining the II Copa Rio is that it was the second and last. It is not well known why five clubs from Rio and São Paulo got together and forced the Brazilian Sports Confederation to cancel the Copa Rio. They left the governing body with an international tournament, albeit with a different name and set of regulations. This includes increasing the number of Brazilian competitors to four: two from Rio and two from São Paulo. This new formula should take effect in 1953."

=== 1953–1960: Maracanã Era ===
In March 1953 Fluminense had a great performance in the Medellín Four-Team Tournament, after drawing with Deportivo Cali (1–1) and Alianza Lima (2–2), and defeating Atlético Nacional 3–0, finishing as undefeated runners-up of the inauguration tournament of the Atanasio Girardot Stadium.

As in 1952, Fluminense were the runners-up in the 1953 Carioca tournament and won the 1953 Copa das Municipalidades do Paraná. After playing their first match against Ourinhense, Fluminense hurried back to compete in the Rivadavia Meyer Tournament, replacing Club Nacional de Football, who were prohibited by the Uruguayan Football Association from participating. Fluminense stopped in the semifinals and only returned more than a month later to finish the competition. The club also competed in the Copa Montevideo in 1953 and 1954, finishing in fifth and third place, respectively.

In the 1954 Torneio Rio-São Paulo, Fluminense reached the final round needing only to defeat Vasco da Gama (who were already out of title contention) to be champions, as they had a 1-point lead over Corinthians and Palmeiras, who would contest the Derby Paulista at the Pacaembu. With the Maracanã receiving 42,031 people (34,131 tickets sold), the largest attendance for that edition of the Torneio Rio-São Paulo, Vasco won 1–0 with a goal from Vavá and defended deeply, withstanding Fluminense's pressure until the end. Meanwhile, in São Paulo, Corinthians defeated Palmeiras 1–0, winning the title. That year, Fluminense also competed in the 1954 Rio de Janeiro International Tournament, entering the final with a mixed team and finishing as runners-up.

In 1954 and 1956, Fluminense won the Torneio Início. In the 1954 Campeonato Carioca, they finished fifth, in 1955 third, and in 1956 and 1957, they were runners-up.

The highest number of matches Fluminense played in Latin American countries occurred in 1956, when the team played 17 matches in Argentina, Colombia, Peru, Ecuador, and Aruba, recording ten wins, three draws, and four defeats. That year, Fluminense also played friendlies in Brazil. They defeated Rosario Central in Uberaba 5–1 and, in Rio de Janeiro, beat Porto 3–0 with 101,745 people present at the Maracanã, which would be Fluminense's largest attendance for an international match, even with tickets priced about 50% higher than those for the Campeonato Carioca.

Fluminense were undefeated champions of the 1957 Torneio Rio-São Paulo, clinching the title in the penultimate round in São Paulo at the Pacaembu Stadium by defeating Portuguesa 3–1, with two goals from Waldo Machado (the competition's top scorer with thirteen goals) and one from Léo for Flu, while Liminha scored for "Lusa". The tricolor played 9 matches, winning 7 and drawing 2, scoring 23 goals and conceding 11. Their biggest win in this tournament was 5–1 over Palmeiras at the Maracanã on 4 May. The final match was a 2–1 victory over São Paulo at the Maracanã.

In the 1959 Campeonato Carioca, the team played 22 matches, with seventeen victories, 4 draws, and only 1 defeat (to Bangu in the first round, 1–0), scoring 45 goals and conceding just 9 (3 in a celebratory draw on the final round against Botafogo). They won the Carioca championship in the penultimate round by defeating Madureira 2–0. Fluminense's all-time top scorer, Waldo Machado, scored 14 goals in this competition and was one of the standout players of this team, which also featured names like Castilho, Pinheiro, Altair, Maurinho, and Telê Santana.

Before the defeat to Bangu, the draw against Flamengo ended a sequence of 21 consecutive victories, a Brazilian professional football record that would only be surpassed in 2011. Had it not been for the 1–0 defeat to Bangu, Fluminense would have reached a 43-match unbeaten run, as they would not be defeated again until 14 January 1960, in Mexico City, against Club de Fútbol América, 1–0.

Fluminense won their second consecutive Torneio Rio-São Paulo title in 1960 by defeating Palmeiras at the Maracanã on 17 April 1–0, with a goal from Waldo in the 27th minute of the first half, in front of 53,738 paying spectators. In 9 matches played, the team won 6, drew 2, and had only 1 defeat, in the Fla-Flu, 2–1. The most emphatic victory was 7–2 over São Paulo on 20 March. The competition's top scorer was Waldo Machado with eleven goals.

In January and February, Fluminense played 11 matches in Hispanic America, with 7 wins, 1 draw, and 3 defeats. In May 1960, the club played 19 matches in Europe, in 9 countries (England, Portugal, Belgium, Netherlands, Sweden, Norway, Hungary, Italy, and Spain), recording 13 wins, 1 draw, and 5 defeats in its most extensive tour of the European continent. The most emphatic victories were against Swedish teams: 11–0 against Ystads IF, 10–0 against Östers IF, and 9–0 against the Borlänge Combined team. They also won 8–2 against the Norwegian Combined team of Lyn/Skeid. The tricolor also defeated clubs such as Brighton, Middlesbrough, Feyenoord, Genoa, and Valencia. The most significant defeat was 3–0 against Sporting in Lisbon, in the first match of the tour. The draw was 2–2 against Standard Liège in Belgium.

Fluminense were also champions of the Taça Brasil — Zona Sul in 1960, facing Grêmio in the final. The results were a 1–0 defeat at the Estádio Olímpico (goal by Elton for the gaúchos, in front of 30,000 spectators), a 4–2 victory in the second match (with two goals from Waldo, and one each from Jair Francisco and Maurinho for Flu, and two from Gessi for Grêmio; the match was held at the Estádio das Laranjeiras with increased ticket prices and a packed stadium of about 20,000 people, as the Maracanã was undergoing renovations) and, with the advantage of a draw in the final match, a 1–1 result (goals by Jair Francisco and Elton, with the Maracanã being reopened just over 24 hours before solely for this match, still attracting about 35,000 people, 26,631 of whom paid) secured them the title. To reach this final, Fluminense eliminated Fonseca from Niterói with 3–0 and 8–0 victories (the largest win in Taça Brasil history), and Cruzeiro from Belo Horizonte with a 1–1 draw and a 4–1 victory.

Having won the regional stage, they qualified for the national tournament semifinals but were eliminated by Palmeiras, who would become champions of that tournament, with a 0–0 draw and a 1–0 defeat at the Maracanã in front of about 50,000 people. Despite pressuring the opponent, Flu felt the absence of their top scorer Waldo in these two matches and conceded the elimination goal at 44 minutes and 30 seconds of the second half. From 1962 onwards, Rio and São Paulo teams began entering directly into the semifinals, bypassing the regional tournaments.

In summary, during this period, the tricolor club won the Campeonato Carioca in 1951 and 1959, were runners-up in 1952, 1953, 1957, and 1960, won the Torneio Rio-São Paulo in 1957 and 1960 (were runners-up in 1954), in addition to the major conquest of the 1952 Copa Rio, the 1960 Taça Brasil — Zona Sul, and the Torneio Início in 1954 and 1956, considering only official titles.

=== 1961–1968: Victories at home and abroad ===
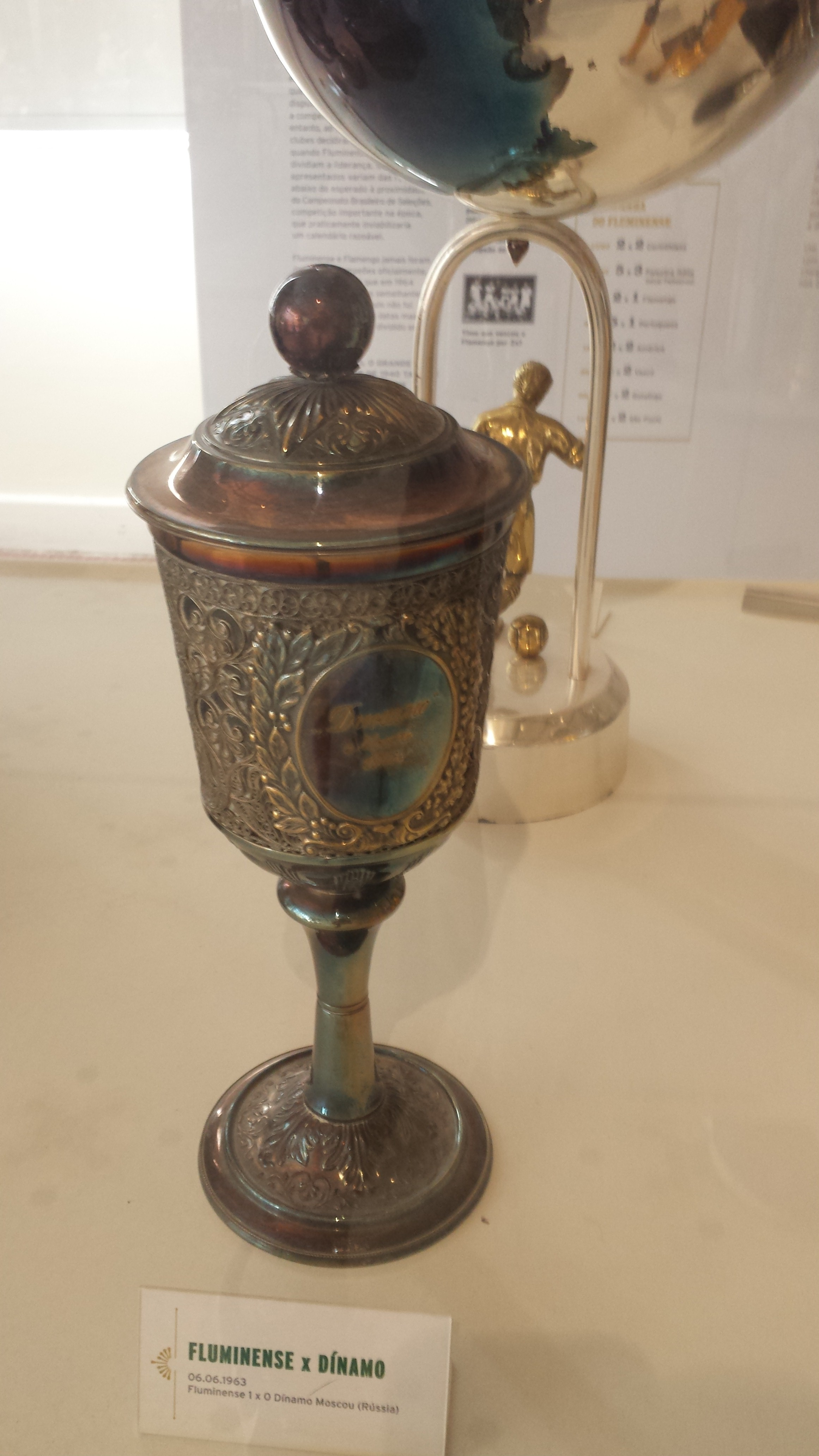
Trophy from the match against FC Dynamo Moscow, 1963.

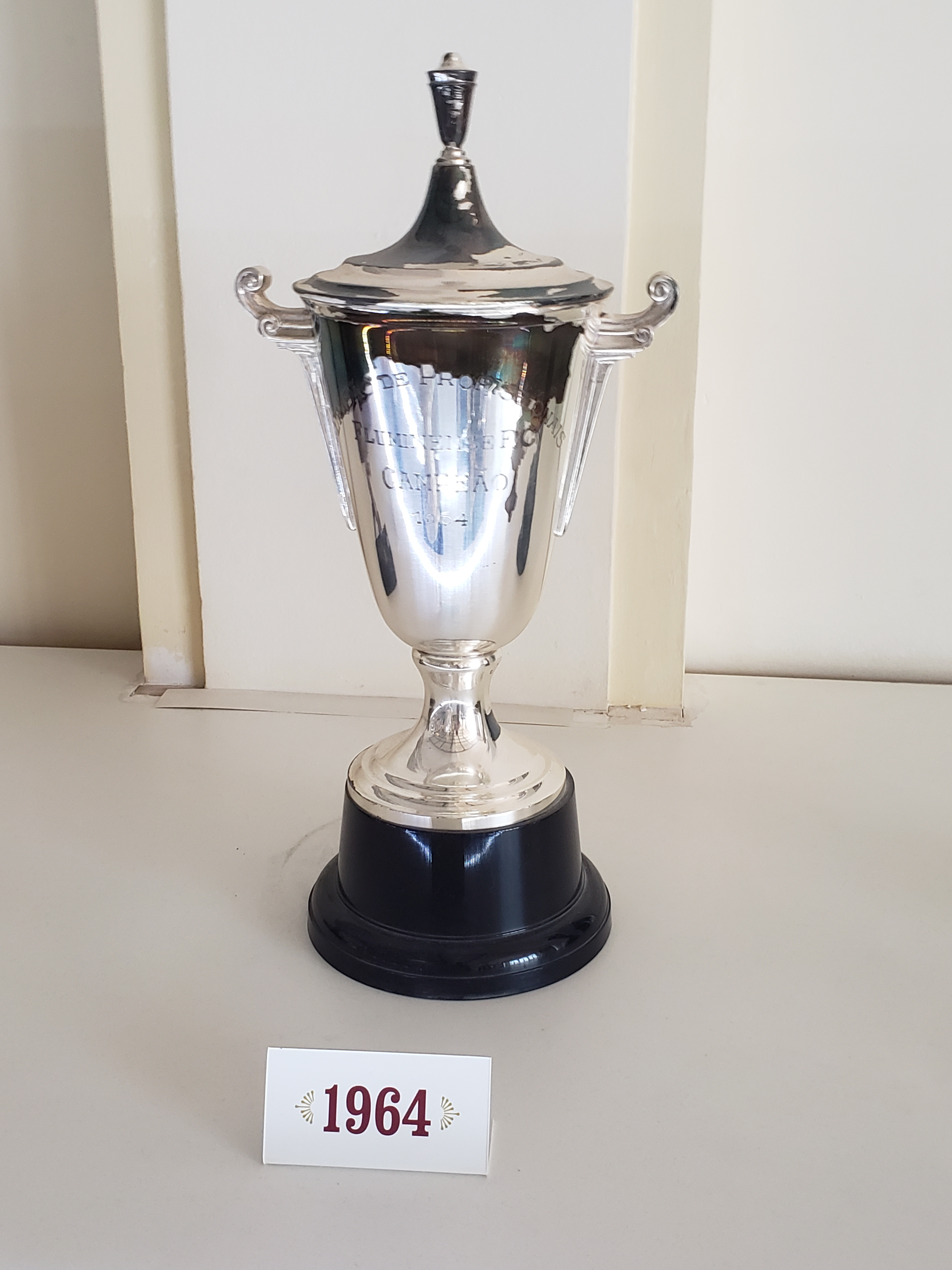
Trophy from the 1964 Campeonato Carioca.

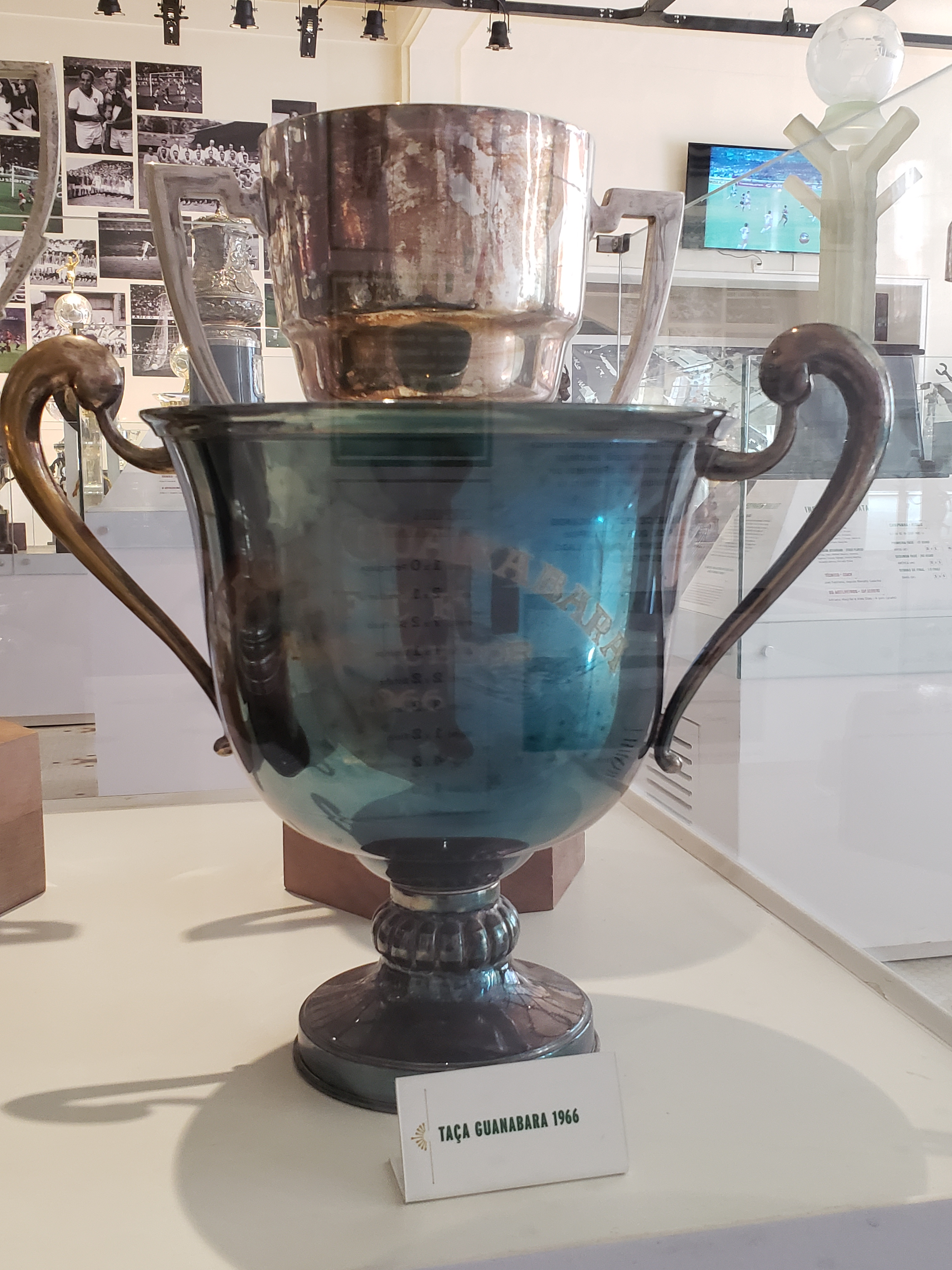
1966 Guanabara Cup

In 1961, Fluminense made a successful tour of Europe and Africa, winning 7, drawing 2, and losing only 1 of 10 matches, the loss being 2–0 against Sporting in the first match. The matches were against Nacional in Cairo (Flu 2–1), Tanta in the Egyptian city of the same name (Flu 3–0), in Bulgaria against the national A and B teams (1–0 and 1–1), in France against Olympique de Nice (7–2), in Italy, in Milan, against Inter (1–1), concluding the tour in Spain, against Espanyol in Barcelona (2–1), Málaga in Málaga (6–0), and finally against Valencia in Valencia (3–2). During the tour, Waldo Machado was sold to Valencia, causing significant technical setbacks for Fluminense, who finished the 1961 Campeonato Carioca in fifth place. The tricolor's all-time top scorer became the second-highest scorer in Valencia's history and, after retiring, settled permanently in Spain.

Finishing third in the 1962 Campeonato Carioca, Fluminense would face the Soviet Olympic Team in 1962, losing 1–0 at the Maracanã, and in 1963, drawing 0–0 with the main Soviet team in Volgograd. Six days before the draw, they defeated Dynamo Moscow 1–0 in the Russian capital. That year, they played a total of 11 matches in Scandinavia and the Soviet Union, with nine wins, one draw, and just one defeat, 2–1 in the very first match, as had happened the previous year, against the Swedish Osk-Degerfors Combined team.

In 1963, the Fla-Flu that decided the 1963 Campeonato Carioca ended 0–0, making Flamengo champions and Fluminense runners-up, and set the world record for attendance between clubs: 194,603 (177,656 of whom paid). That same year, Fluminense finished third in the 1963 Torneio Rio-São Paulo, their best placement in the interstate tournament during this period. Between 1961 and 1968, they would finish third in the Campeonato Carioca in four editions.

As had happened in the 1951 Campeonato Carioca, Fluminense and Bangu finished the 1964 Campeonato Carioca tied on the same number of points, requiring a best-of-three points series (a win still awarded 2 points) to decide the champion. Fluminense won the first match 1–0 in front of 64,014 paying spectators with a goal from Amoroso, and the second and decisive match 3–1 in front of 75,106 paying spectators with goals from Joaquinzinho, Jorginho, and Gílson Nunes for the tricolor, with Bianchini scoring for Bangu, thus becoming Carioca champions. In the final match, coach Tim instructed center-forward Amoroso to drop back to build up play, which drew his marker, opening space for other Fluminense players to appear in Bangu's area, surprising the opposing team. In 26 matches, the team obtained 17 wins, 5 draws, and only 4 defeats, with 48 goals for and 17 against. Amoroso was the top scorer of this championship with nineteen goals, and the career of Carlos Alberto Torres, recently promoted from the youth team, who would become captain of Brazil in the 1970 FIFA World Cup, began.

In 1965, Fluminense won the Torneio Início by beating Flamengo in the final, and had another great moment by beating Botafogo 7–2 in the 1965 Torneio Rio-São Paulo. In the third-place match of the 1965 Rio de Janeiro IV Centenary Tournament, they defeated the Paraguay national team 3–2, finishing the 1965 Campeonato Carioca and the 1966 edition in third place.

In 1966, Fluminense were undefeated champions of the Taça Guanabara, then an independent competition from the Campeonato Carioca, by beating Flamengo in the final 3–1 in front of 69,730 paying spectators, with two goals from Mário and one from Amoroso for Fluminense, and Silva for Flamengo. They also won the Torneio Quadrangular Pará-Guanabara that year, a competition that included, besides Fluminense, Botafogo, Remo, and Paysandu.

In 1967 and 1968, they would finish third and fourth in the Campeonato Carioca, respectively.

Between 1952 and 1968, Fluminense played 128 international matches, winning 75, drawing 23, and losing 30, with 314 goals for and 175 against. In the same period, the tricolor played 321 interstate matches, winning 181, drawing 57, and losing 84, with 743 goals for and 409 against.

=== 1969–1974: The First "Máquina Tricolor", the death of Ari Ercílio, and the 1973 Carioca Championship ===
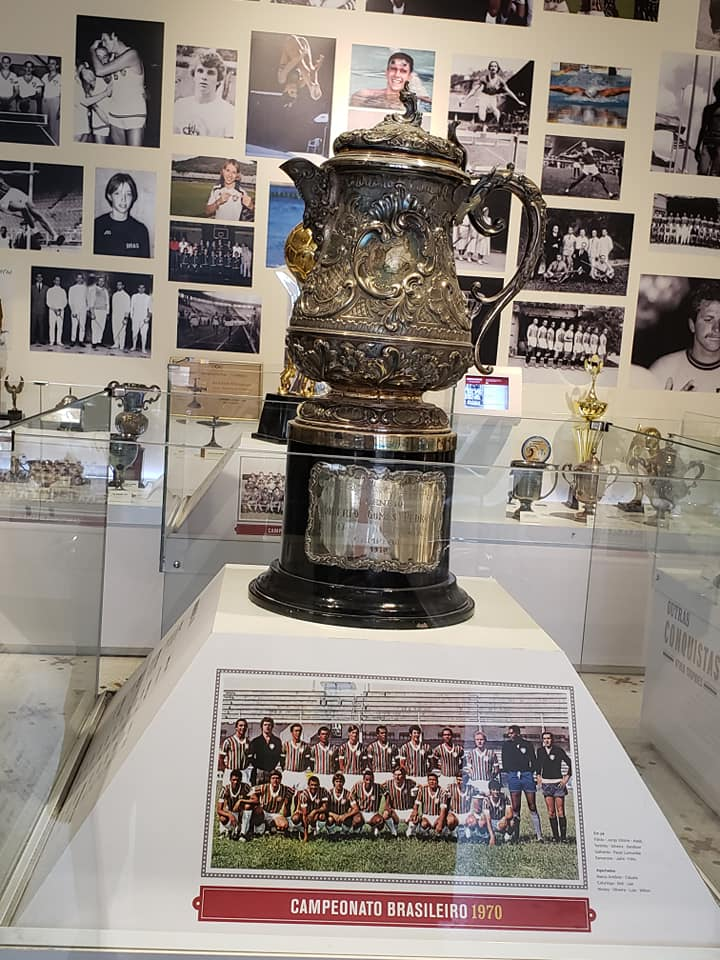
Trophy from the 1970 Campeonato Brasileiro.

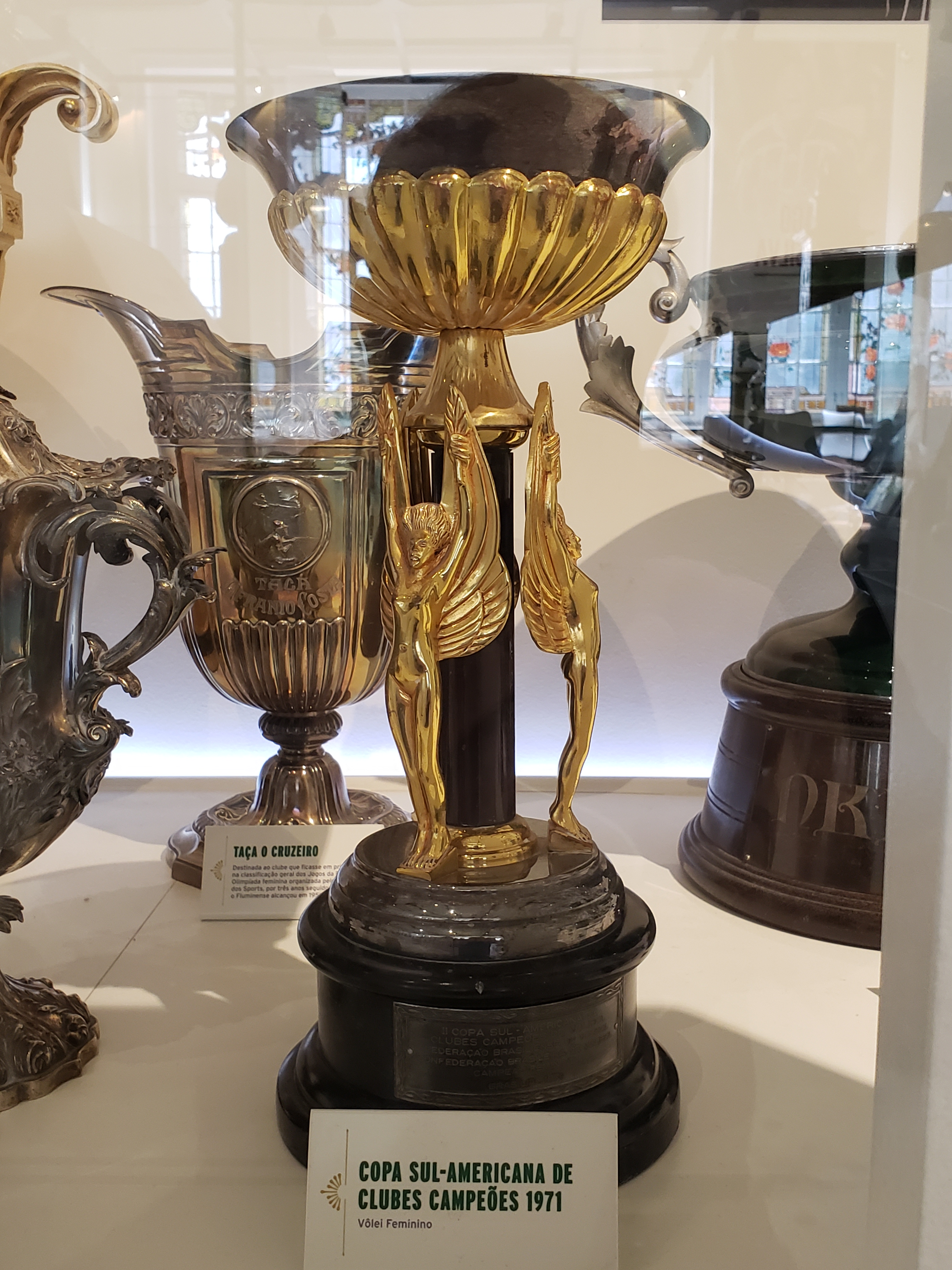
Trophy from the 1971 South American Women's Volleyball Club Championship

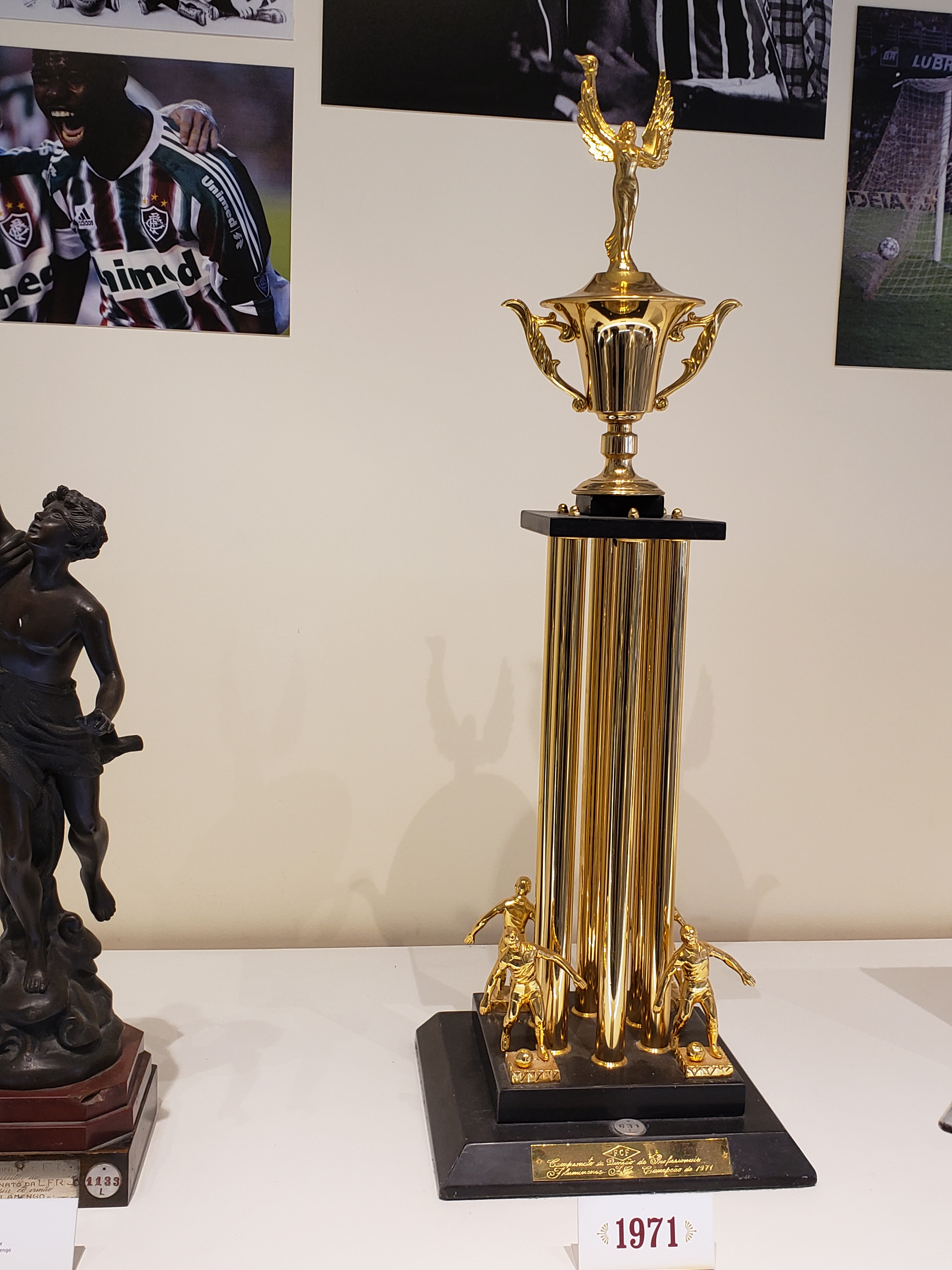
Trophy from the 1971 Campeonato Carioca.

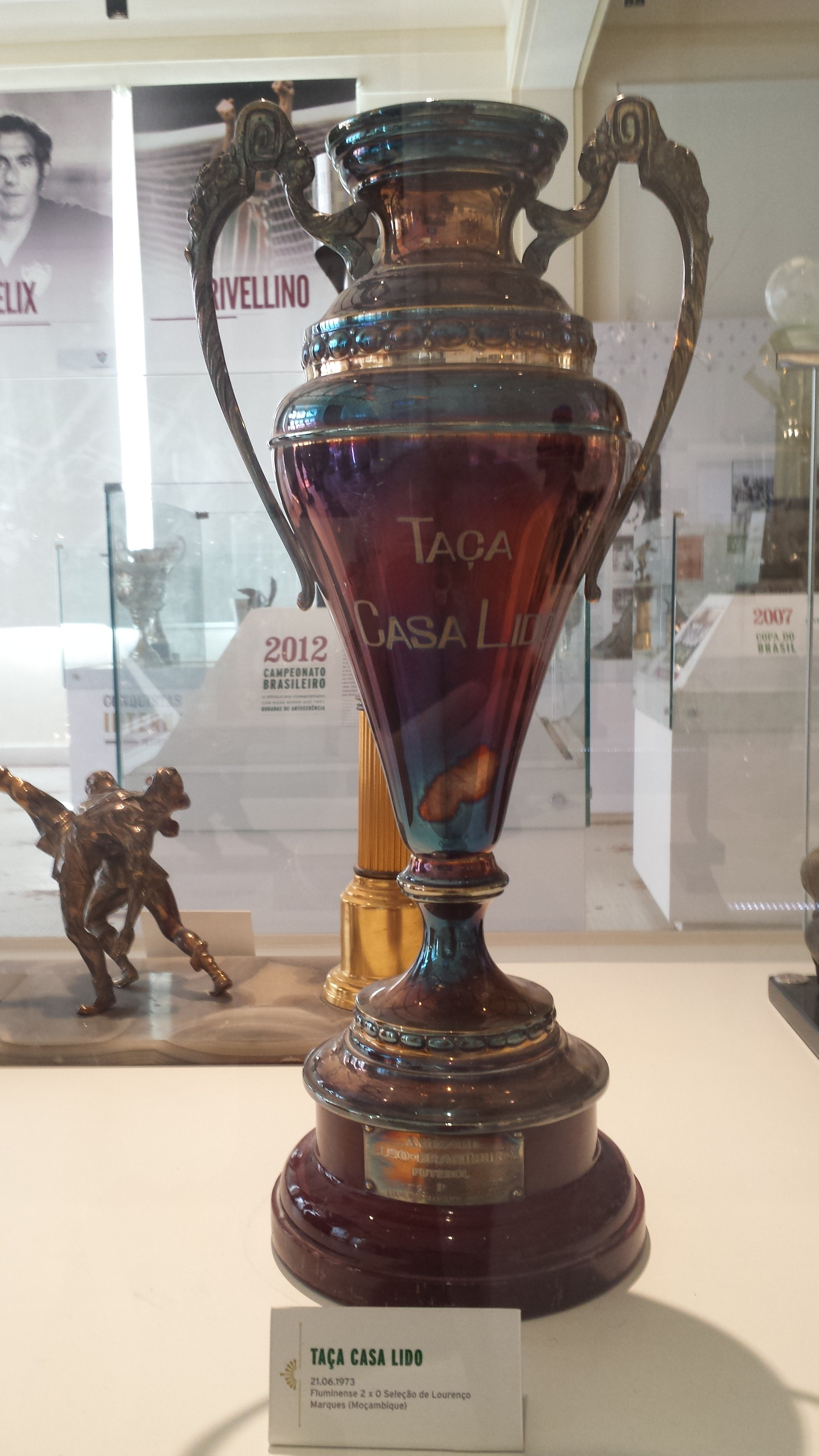
1973 Casa Lido Trophy won in Mozambique.

The team assembled by coach Telê Santana in 1969 brought joy to the fans for three years, winning the Campeonato Carioca in 1969 and 1971, the 1970 Torneio Roberto Gomes Pedrosa in 1970 (a competition recognized at the time by the CBD until 1974 as being on par with the Campeonato Brasileiro, which would change its name the following year), were Carioca runners-up that same year, and won the Taça Guanabara, then an independent Carioca competition, in 1969 and 1971.

In the 1970 Torneio Roberto Gomes Pedrosa, Fluminense obtained 10 wins, 5 draws, and only 4 defeats. The final match of the national championship was at the Maracanã against Atlético Mineiro, ending 1–1 in front of 112,403 paying spectators. Also participating in this final stage were Cruzeiro, whom Fluminense defeated 1–0 at the Mineirão, and Palmeiras, defeated by the tricolor 1–0 at the Maracanã. The Torneio Roberto Gomes Pedrosa was created in 1967 by the Rio and São Paulo football federations and organized and sponsored by the CBD from 1968 onwards. In the decisive match against Atlético-MG, Fluminense fans displayed a banner reading "Pra frente, Máquina" ("Forward, Machine!"), to honor the team.

Fluminense were also champions of the 1969 Taça Guanabara, defeating America 1–0 in front of 67,492 paying spectators, and, in 1971, by defeating Flamengo 3–1, with three goals from Mickey. Until 1972, the Taça Guanabara was a separate tournament from the Campeonato Carioca.

In the 1970 Campeonato Carioca, Fluminense defeated Vasco 2–0 in the final round, but stumbled with a loss to Olaria. They missed out on the three-peat due to these setbacks.

In these three years, Fluminense obtained 34 wins, 15 draws, and 7 defeats (4 in 1970), scoring 90 goals and conceding 39 in the Carioca championships. Their only defeat in 1971 was 1–0 to Botafogo on 18 April 1971, in the controversial final stage of the championship, with a penalty goal reported by the press as irregular, which gave the advantage of a draw to the black-and-white team in the last match of the final stage, also causing Fluminense's only defeat in that championship. In the final match, the Tricolor defeated Botafogo 1–0, with a goal equally claimed by rival fans as irregular. To confirm their superiority, they also won the 1971 Taça Guanabara in its last year as a regular independent competition.

In the 1971 Copa Libertadores, Fluminense were eliminated after losing at the Maracanã to Deportivo Italia 1–0, a team Fluminense had beaten 6–0 in their own country. Demoralized by the unexpected result, which would have practically guaranteed their qualification for the next phase, the team also lost the last match to Palmeiras 3–1 (in São Paulo, Fluminense had defeated them 2–0), thus failing to qualify. Fluminense's other two matches were against Deportivo Galicia, whom Fluminense beat 3–1 away and 4–1 at the Maracanã, finishing this edition in seventh place.

In December 1971, Fluminense would win the Torneio José Macedo Aguiar in Salvador, contested against Flamengo and the Bahian clubs Esporte Clube Bahia and Esporte Clube Vitória.

Fluminense's courts hosted many of the biggest international matches held in Brazil for decades, having hosted matches of the 1972 Davis Cup.

On November 18, 1972, defender Ari Ercílio drowned. He arrived at the club with Argentine Luis Artime and world champion Gérson to strengthen the team, which was undergoing changes compared to the previous three years.

Fluminense, Carioca runners-up in 1972, would become champions again the following year with a team featuring several youngsters recently promoted from the youth sector, like Carlos Alberto Pintinho, Kléber, Marquinho (later known as Marco Aurélio), and Rubens Galaxe, led by the experienced playmaker Gérson, the Canhotinha de Ouro (Golden Left Foot). The team, in 25 matches, obtained 13 wins, 7 draws, and 5 defeats, with 36 goals for and 16 against, having defeated Flamengo in the final 4–2 in a match played under heavy rain, in front of 74,073 paying spectators. Manfrini was the top tricolor scorer and second in the championship, with 13 goals. Early that year, Fluminense would win the 1973 Rio de Janeiro International Summer Tournament, held at the São Januário Stadium against Vasco and two Argentine clubs, Argentinos Juniors and Atlanta.

Also in 1973, the club made its most extensive tour of Africa, playing 8 matches on the continent, with seven wins, 1 draw, and no defeats, scoring 28 goals and conceding only 6. The biggest win was 7–0 against Benfica, and the only draw was 2–2 against the Zambia national team.

In 1974, the team arrived undefeated and with the advantage of a draw for the decisive Taça Guanabara match against America, having their greatest performance that year in the 5–1 victory against Vasco in front of 72,368 paying spectators, with three goals from Gil. After the 1–0 defeat that gave the title to America in front of 97,681 paying spectators, the team's performance dropped significantly, and they finished the Campeonato Carioca in fifth place.

=== 1975–1986: The revived "Máquina" ===
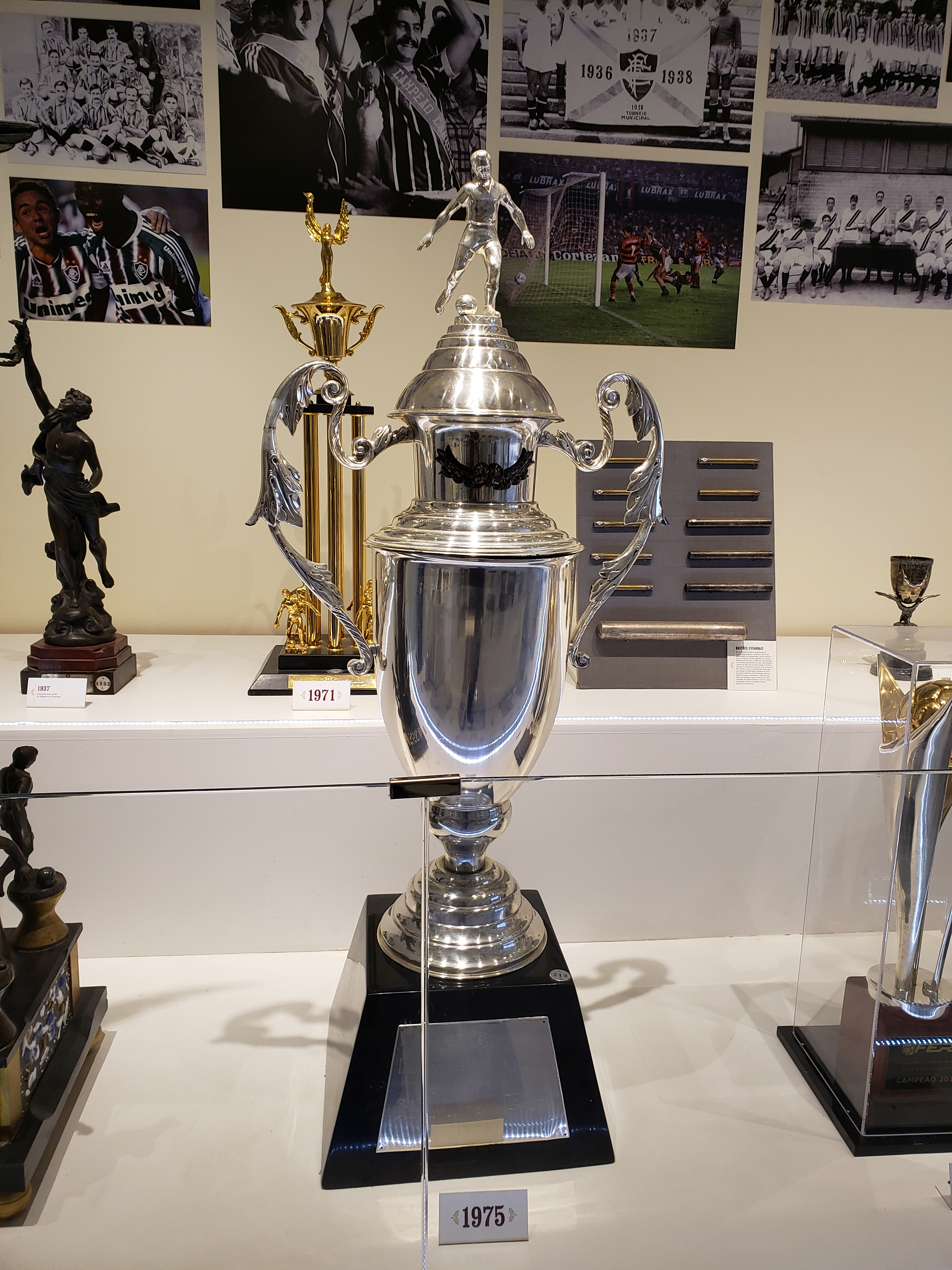
Trophy from the 1975 Campeonato Carioca.

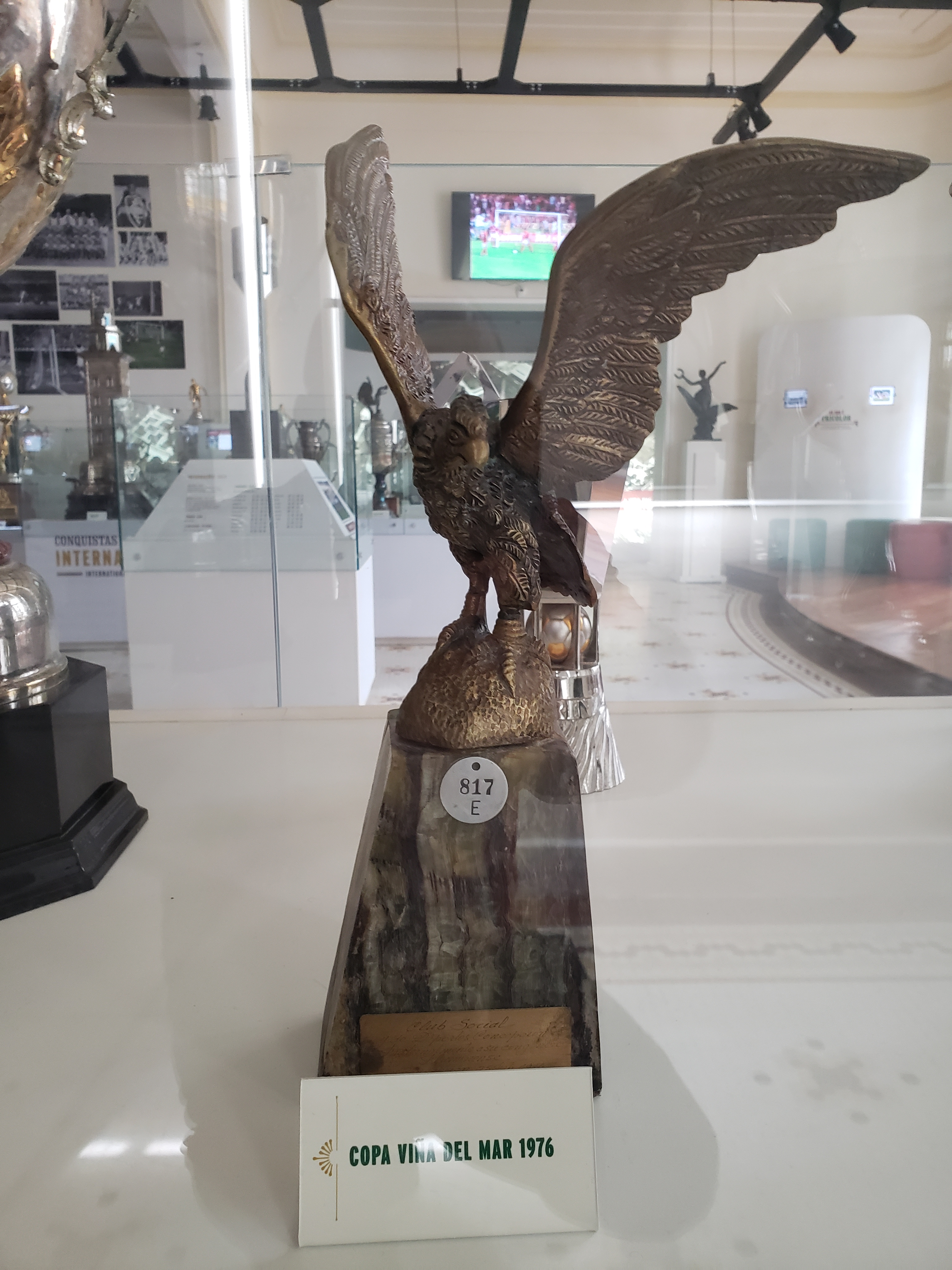
Trophy from the 1976 Viña del Mar Tournament.

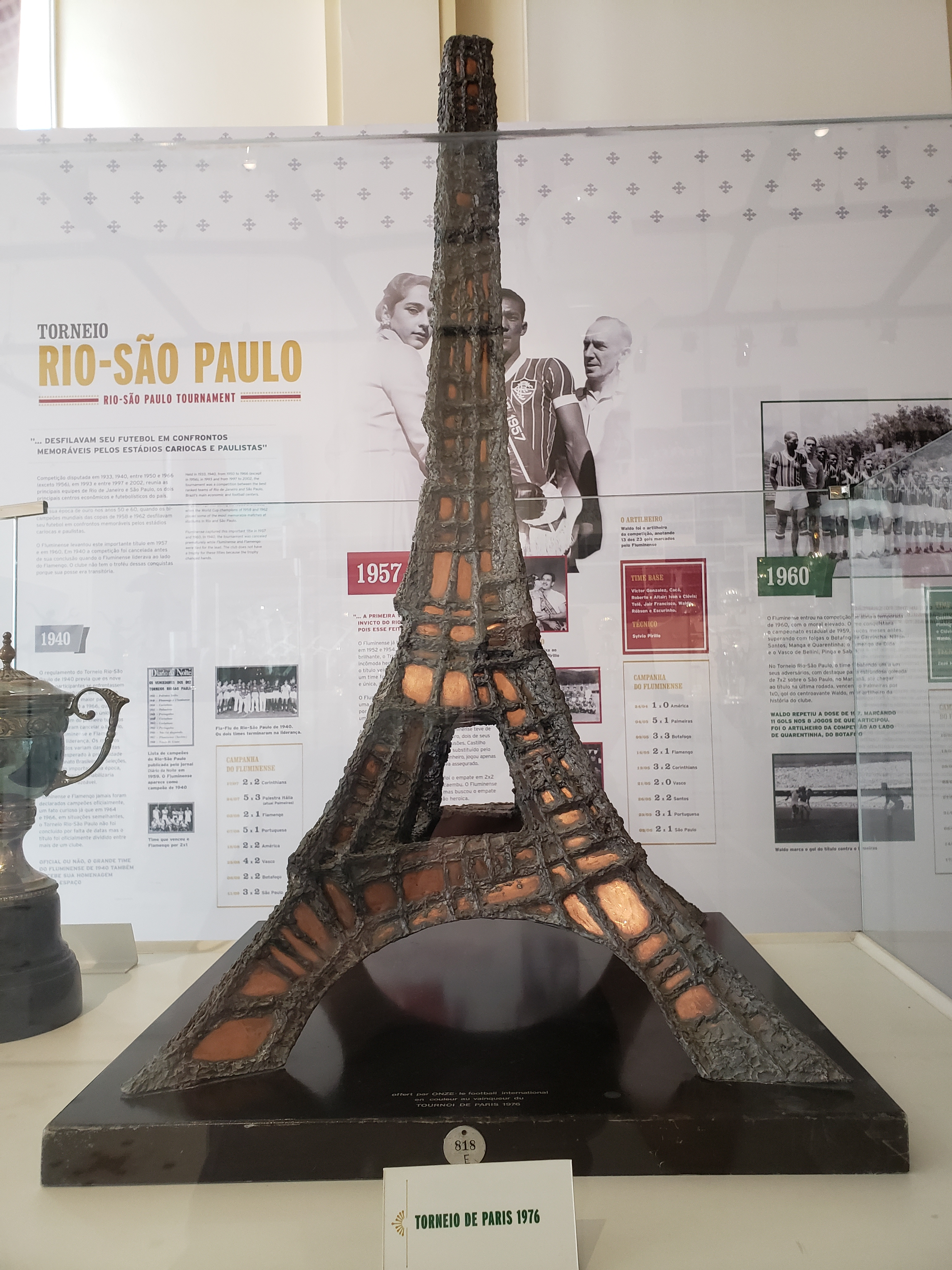
Trophy from the 1976 Paris International Tournament.

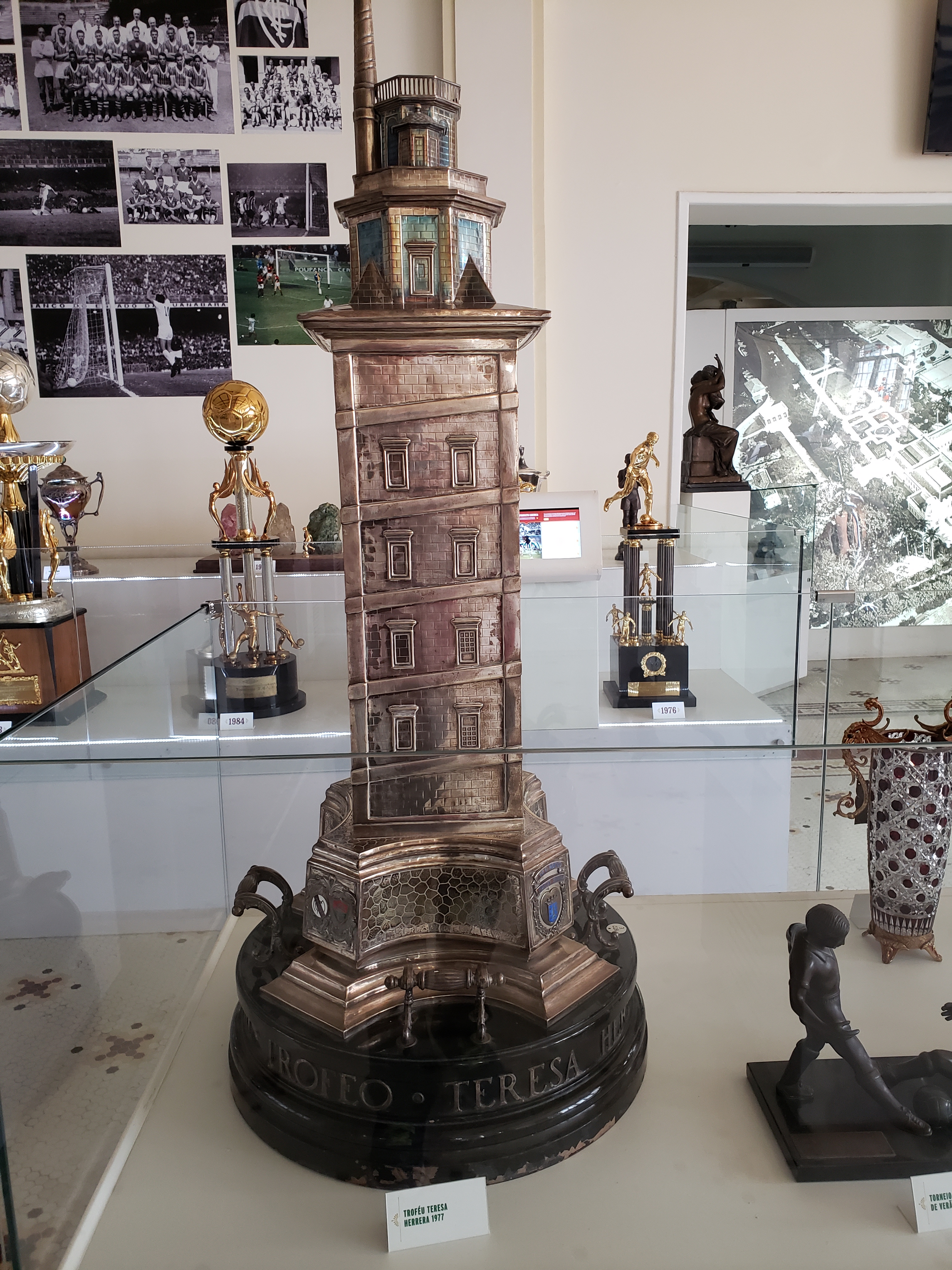
1977 Teresa Herrera Trophy.

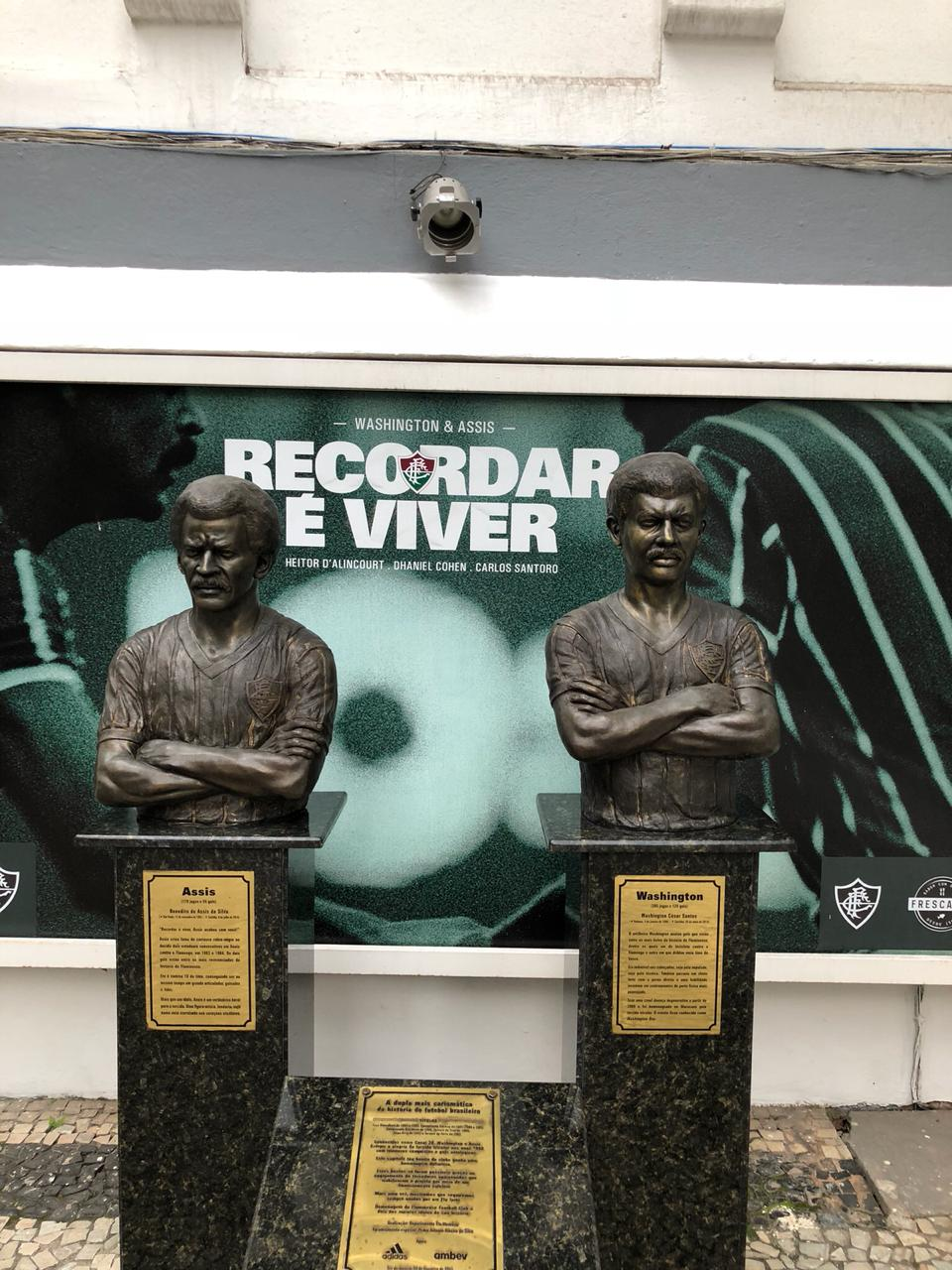
Busts of Assis and Washington.

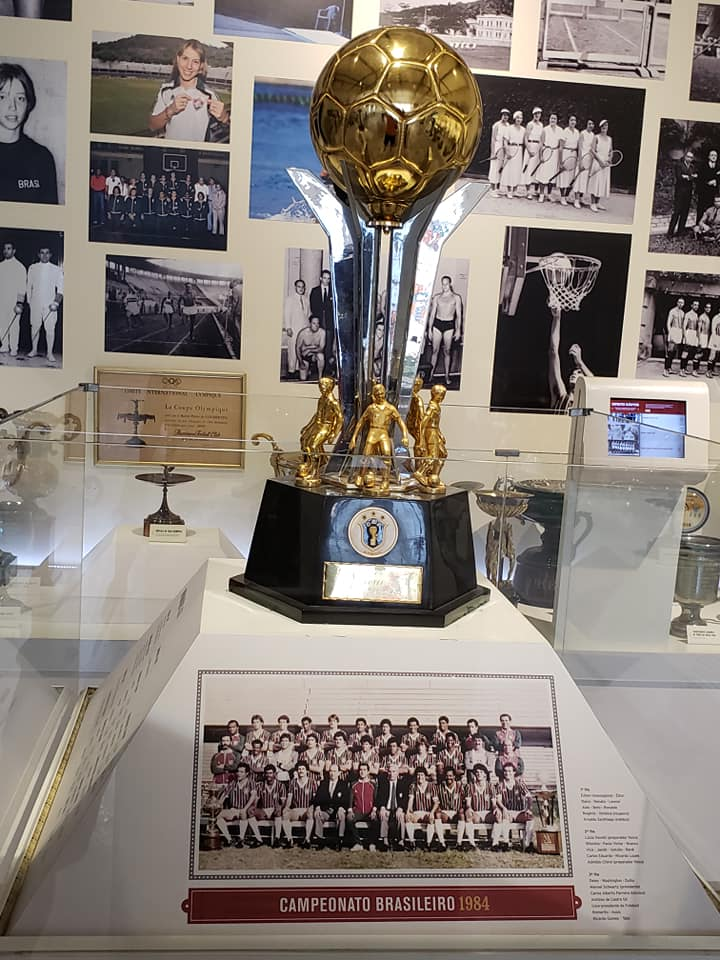
Trophy from the 1984 Campeonato Brasileiro Série A.

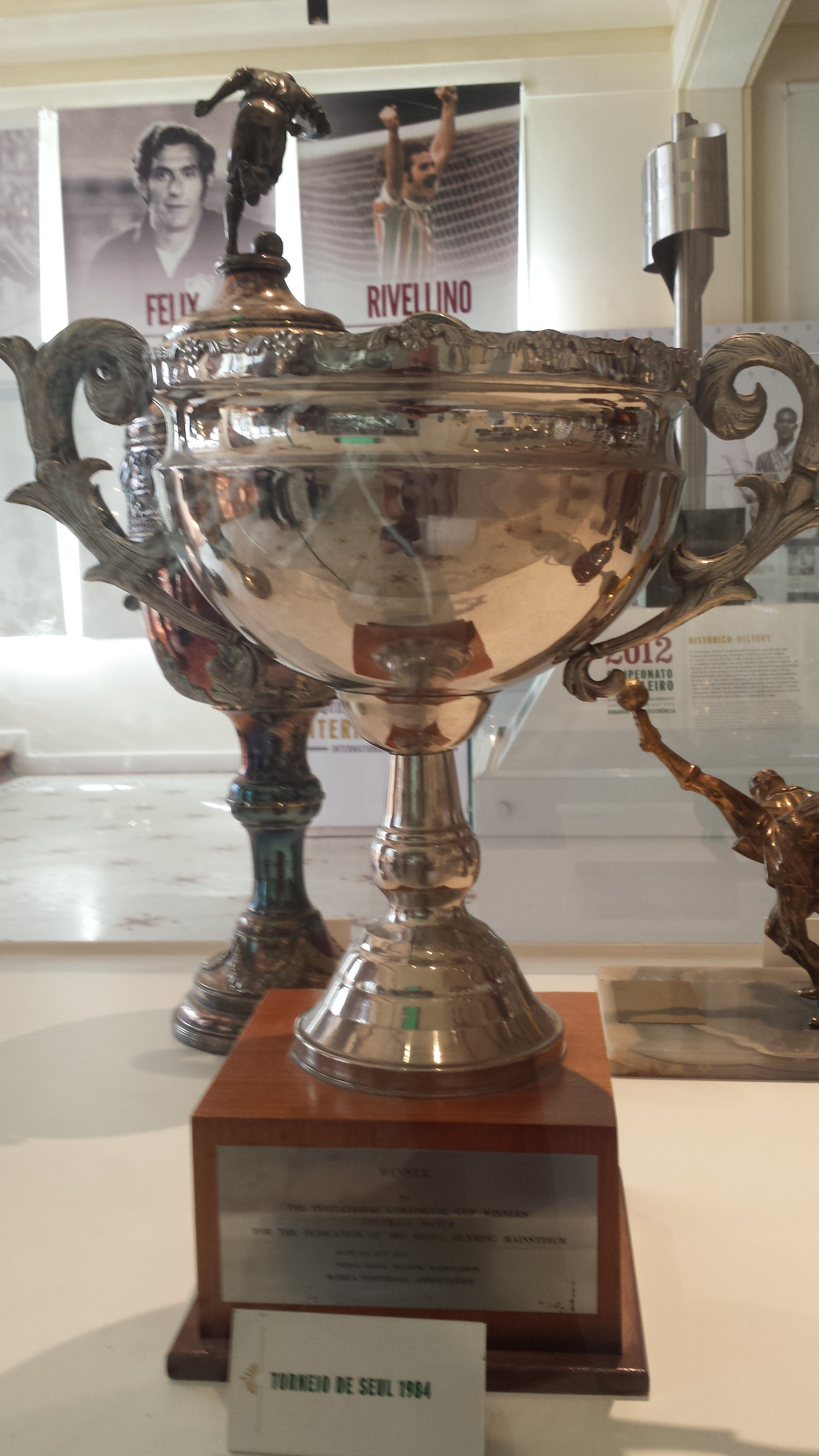
Trophy from the 1984 Seoul Tournament.

During the back-to-back victories in the 1975 and 1976 Carioca Championships, Fluminense fielded two star-studded teams led by Roberto Rivellino. The team, nicknamed the Máquina Tricolor (Tricolor Machine), ventured on tours around the world, winning a series of prestigious international friendly tournaments. In the 1976 team, the only player who did not play for the Brazil national team was the Argentine forward Narciso Doval. Fluminense had teams with better campaigns and more successful squads than the 1975 and 1976 teams, but perhaps never had teams as skillful, who filled stadiums wherever they went as they provided great football spectacles to viewers.

In the 1975 Campeonato Carioca, Fluminense qualified for the finals by winning the Taça Guanabara against America with a free-kick goal from Rivellino in the 13th minute of the 2nd half of extra time, in front of 96,035 paying spectators. The tricolor's opponents in the final were Botafogo, champion of the second round, and Vasco, champion of the third. In the first final match, Fluminense defeated Vasco 4–1 in front of 79,764 paying spectators; in the second, Vasco defeated Botafogo 2–0; and in the third, with 100,703 paying spectators, Fluminense lost 1–0 but still became the Carioca champions. The tricolor campaign had 31 matches, with nineteen wins, 6 draws, and 6 defeats, 53 goals for and 22 against. The tricolor scorers were Manfrini, with sixteen goals, and Gil and Rivellino, with eleven goals each.

After winning the Taça Guanabara, to celebrate the signing of Paulo César Lima, who was previously the great star of Olympique de Marseille, Fluminense held a friendly against Bayern Munich, the core of the German national team world champions in 1974, which included players like Sepp Maier, Franz Beckenbauer, Gerd Müller, Georg Schwarzenbeck, Jupp Kapellmann, and the rising star Karl-Heinz Rummenigge. The friendly took place on June 10th at night. With 60,137 fans in attendance, the stadium administration had to open the gates after kickoff because they did not expect such a large crowd at the Maracanã. This allowed thousands of people to enter without paying. Fluminense won the match 1–0, with an own goal by Gerd Müller.

During the 1976 championship, Fluminense played 32 matches, winning 23, drawing seven, and losing only two. They scored 74 goals and allowed 26. The top scorer and runner-up of this championship were Fluminense players: Doval with twenty goals and Gil with 19. Fluminense qualified for the finals by winning the third round against Botafogo 5–1. Additionally, Vasco, the Taça Guanabara titleholder; Botafogo, the second-round champion; and America, the repechage champion, all qualified for the finals. As Fluminense and Vasco were tied in this final stage, an extra match was necessary to decide the title, and Fluminense won 1–0, with a goal from Doval in the 14th minute of the second half of extra time, in front of 127,052 paying spectators. In this championship, Fluminense delivered eight thrashings, scoring 4 goals or more, the biggest being 9–0 against Goytacaz on 24 April. Also that year, Fluminense would win the 1976 Viña del Mar Tournament and the 1976 Paris International Tournament.

The club contested the 1977 Teresa Herrera Trophy against Real Madrid, Feyenoord, and Dukla Prague, the core of the Czechoslovak national team. Fluminense finished as champion, defeating Feyenoord 2–0 and, in the final, Dukla, who had eliminated Real Madrid, 4–1. Rivellino, who would leave the club in 1978 after being sold to Al Hilal, was named the tournament's standout player.

Fluminense would also win in 1977 the Copa Vale do Paraíba and the Copa Governador Faria Lima.

Fluminense would finish third in the Carioca championships of 1977 and 1978, fourth in 1979, and would be runners-up in the 1979 Campeonato Carioca Especial.

In 1980, Fluminense won the Campeonato Carioca again with a team almost entirely developed at Laranjeiras; only two players, Gilberto (from Atlético Goianiense) and Cláudio Adão (from Santos), did not come up through the Tricolor youth system. Fluminense defeated Vasco in the final 1–0 with a free-kick goal from Edinho (with 108,957 spectators), the same opponent Fluminense had already beaten in the first round match via a penalty shootout, when 101,199 spectators attended. The campaign of the tricolor youngsters, in 24 matches, had 12 wins, 8 draws, and 4 defeats, with 43 goals for and 25 against. The tricolor Cláudio Adão was the championship's top scorer with twenty goals. That same year, the Tricolor won its sixth South American women's volleyball title, four of which were consecutive.

In 1981 and 1982, Fluminense did not perform well in the Carioca championships, finishing in fifth place. In the 1982 Campeonato Brasileiro, the team finished fifth, missing out on a spot in the semifinals after Tonho scored a goal for Grêmio from long range in front of 69,115 spectators at the Maracanã. In the first leg, a 1–1 draw at the Estádio Olímpico, and in the second, a 2–1 defeat for Fluminense.

After winning the 1983 Taça Guanabara in a derby against America which they won 2–0 with two goals from Assis, in front of 79,275 spectators, Fluminense qualified for the finals against Flamengo, champion of the Taça Rio, and Bangu, the team with the most points in the championship. Fluminense drew with Bangu 1–1, defeated Flamengo 1–0 with a goal from Assis in the 45th minute of the second half in a match played under rain with 83,713 spectators. As Flamengo beat Bangu 2–0, Fluminense became Carioca champion. The tricolor campaign had 24 matches, with thirteen wins, 6 draws, and 5 defeats, with 31 goals for and 13 against. The tricolor top scorer was Assis, with eleven goals, and the second was center-forward Washington, with eight goals.

Fluminense had great moments in the 1980s, but the main one was perhaps when they lifted the Brazilian title in 1984 by beating Vasco in the final matches, the most important Clássico dos Gigantes held to date. The tricolor campaign had 26 matches, with fifteen wins, 9 draws, and only 2 defeats, with 37 goals for and only 13 against. In the final matches, Fluminense defeated Vasco in the first match 1–0, with a goal from Romerito, and drew 0–0 in the second, in front of 128,381 spectators. The biggest tricolor win was in the quarter-finals against Coritiba, at the Maracanã, 5–0, thrilling the 60,385 spectators.

In the 1984 Campeonato Carioca, Fluminense achieved another victory after 24 matches, with sixteen wins, 5 draws, and 3 defeats, 40 goals for and 16 against, with Romerito being the tricolor top scorer with eleven goals. The tricolor team qualified for the finals for being the club with the most points during the championship, against Flamengo, champion of the Taça Guanabara, and Vasco, champion of the Taça Rio. In the finals, Fluminense defeated Vasco 2–0 in front of 94,123 spectators and Flamengo 1–0, in front of 153,520, again with a goal from Assis, this time in the 30th minute of the 2nd half. In October, they would win the 1984 Seoul Tournament.

Fluminense achieved their third consecutive state championship in a final against Bangu in 1985, winning 2–1 in front of 88,162 spectators, with a goal from Marinho for Bangu in the 4th minute of the 1st half, and in the second, with goals from Romerito in the 18th minute and Paulinho from a free kick in the 31st, they conquered the title. The tricolor campaign this year had 24 matches, with fifteen wins, 7 draws, and only 2 defeats, with 32 goals for and 12 against.

Fluminense qualified for the finals by winning the Taça Guanabara against America 1–0, with a goal from Romerito in the 38th minute of the 2nd half in front of 47,160 spectators, then contesting the main title against Flamengo, champion of the Taça Rio, and Bangu, the team with the most points during this championship. In the first match, against Flamengo, there was a 1–1 draw in front of 95,049 spectators, and in the second, Bangu beat Flamengo 2–1, taking the advantage of a draw into the final match.

In the 1985 Copa Libertadores, Fluminense did not perform well, finishing the first phase in third place, when only the group leader qualified for the next stage. That year, Fluminense played home and away matches in Group 1 against Vasco, Ferro Carril Oeste, and Argentinos Juniors, who ended up winning the competition. Fluminense had three draws and three defeats on the field, but gained points from the 3–3 draw against Vasco. Despite having been warned beforehand, Vasco fielded the player Gersinho irregularly in this match.

Difficult times for Fluminense began off the field in 1985. Upon assuming the presidency of the Rio de Janeiro State Football Federation, Eduardo Vianna promised to end "the reign of the colored ones." Until then, Fluminense had dominated the Carioca championship. In 1986, the press reported on a refereeing scandal dubbed the "Yellow Slips Scandal." The scandal aimed to prevent Fluminense from winning their fourth consecutive state championship. The team could not attend a match against Americano in Campos dos Goytacazes due to a dengue fever epidemic within the squad. This resulted in the team losing points and their chance at becoming champions.

=== 1987–1999: Decline and Recovery ===
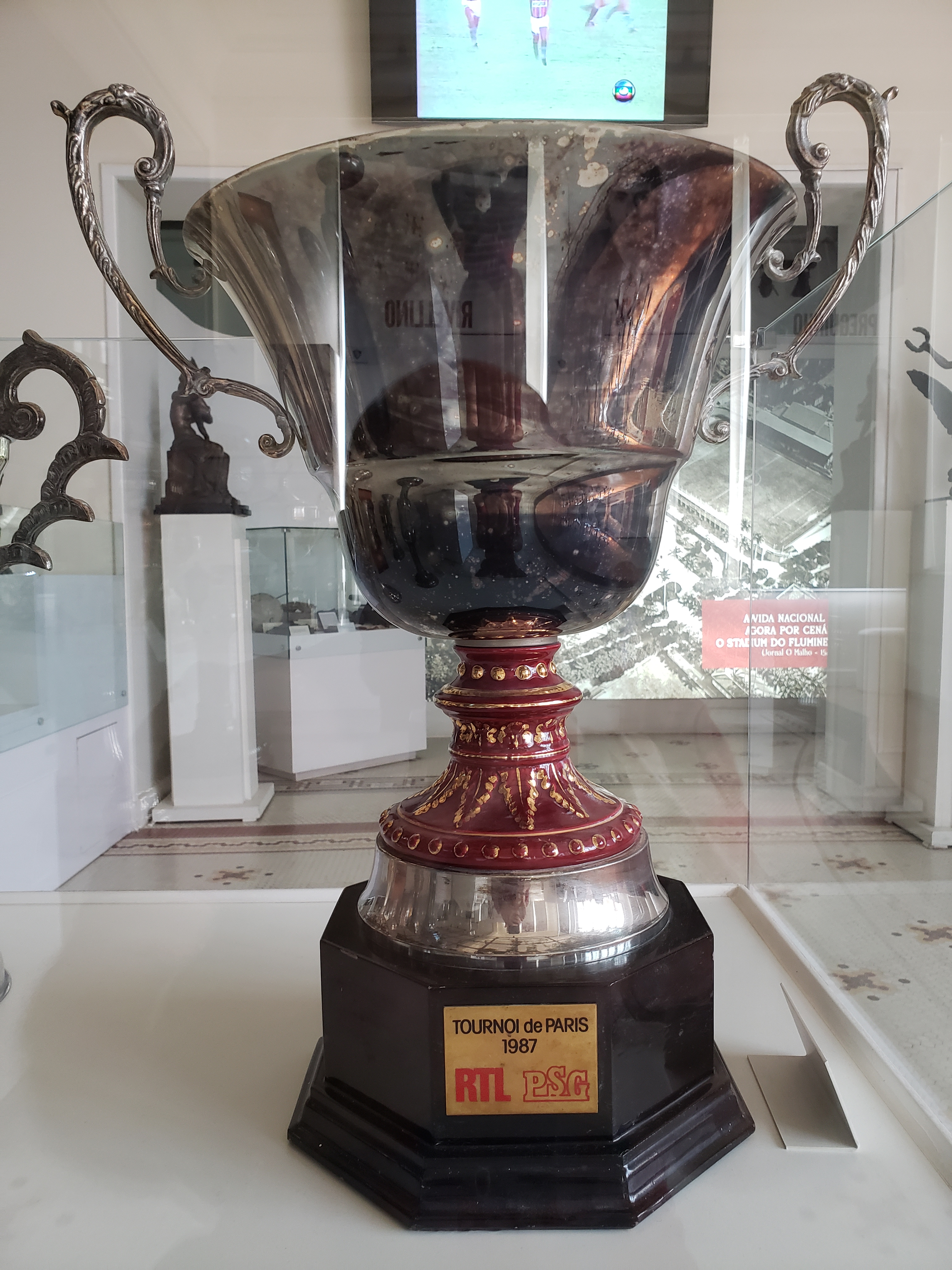
Trophy from the 1987 Paris International Tournament.

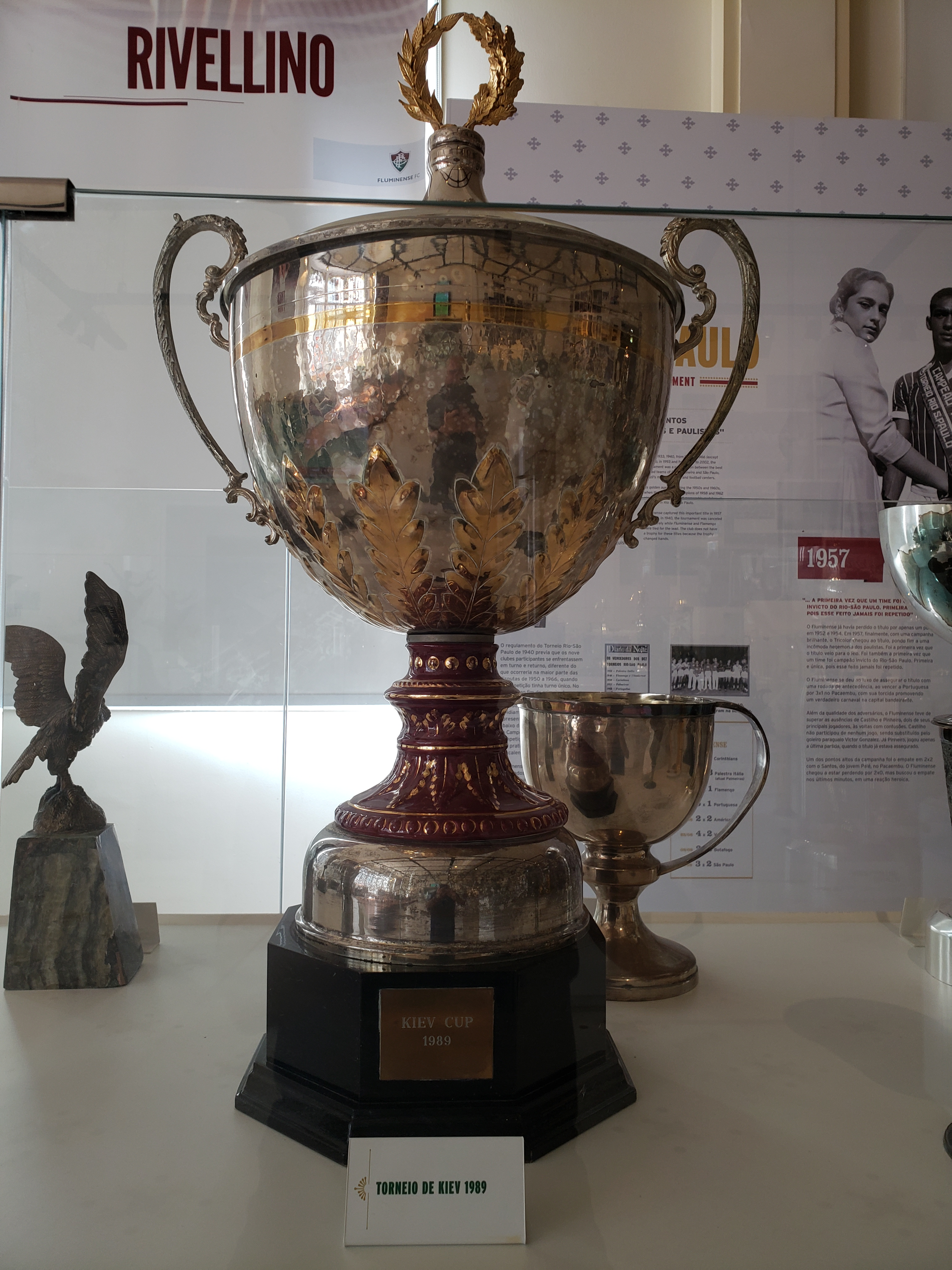
Trophy from the 1989 Kiev Tournament.

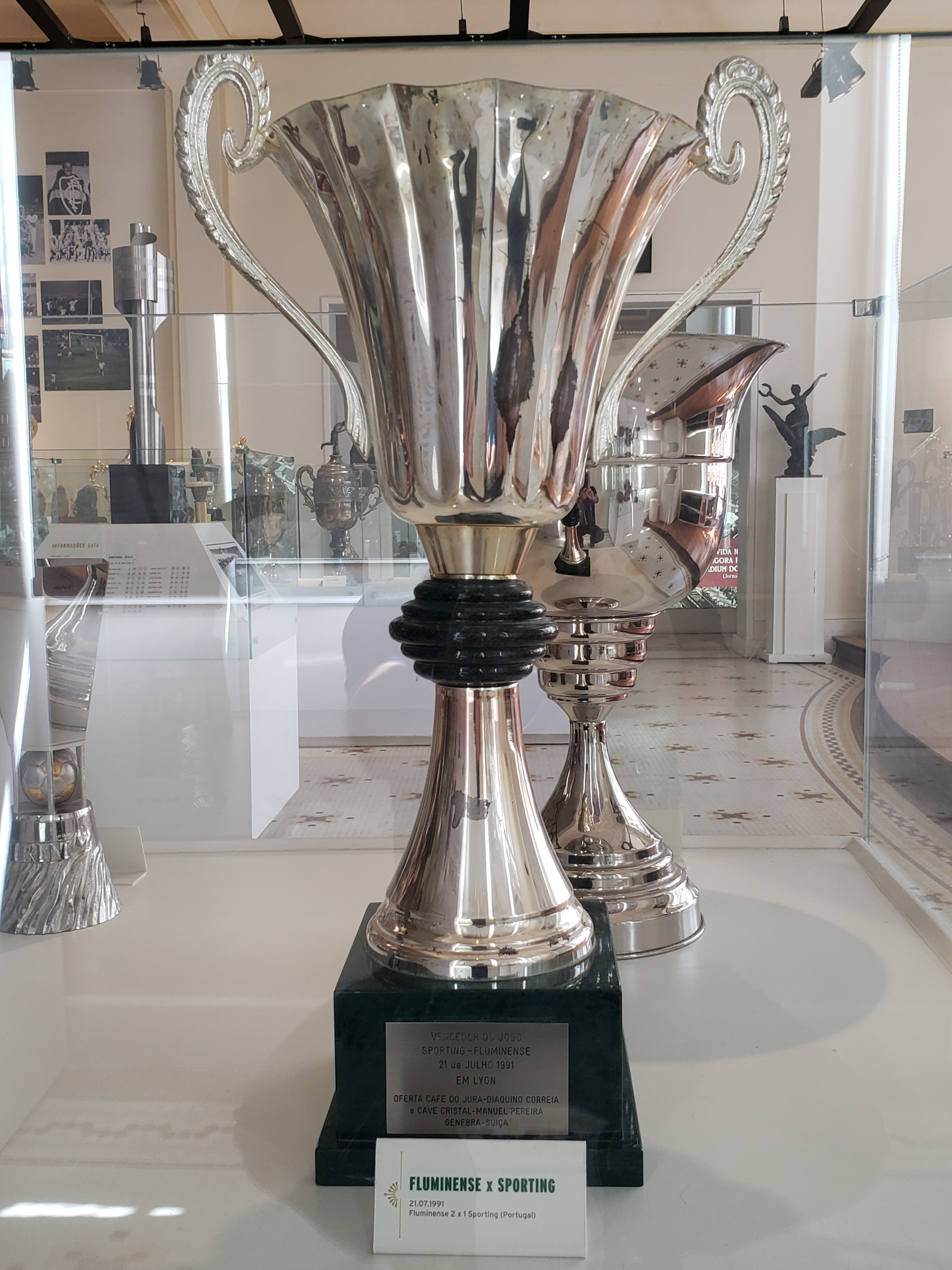
Trophy from the match against Sporting, 1991.

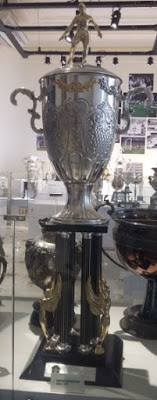
Trophy from the 1999 Série C.

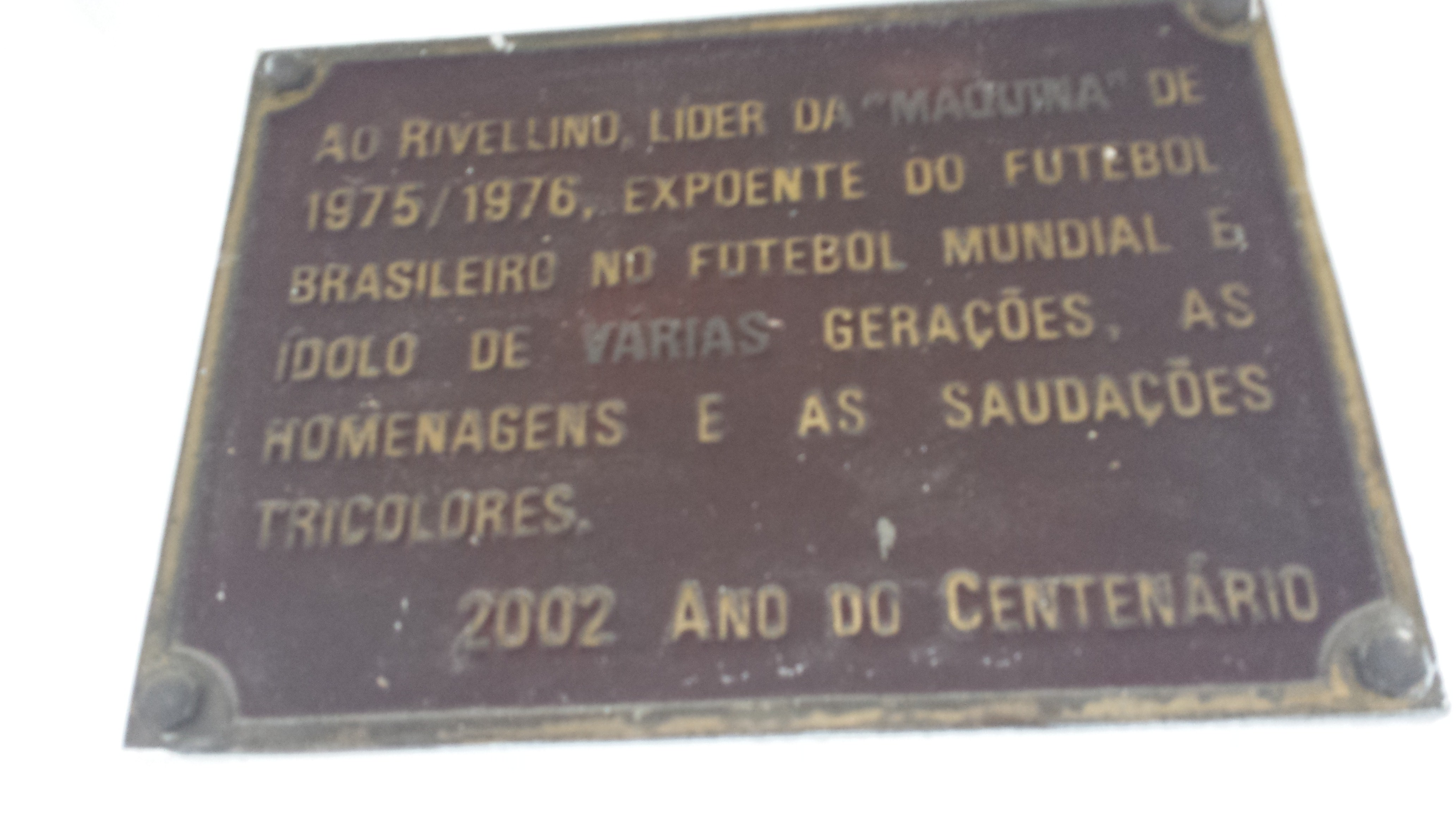
Plaque in honor of Rivellino.

Fluminense won, in 1987, the Kirin Cup in Japan, on its most important tour to Asia, contesting the final against Torino, whose great star was Léo Júnior. In front of about 40,000 spectators at the National Stadium, Fluminense won 2–0 with goals from Washington and Tato. In the other matches played, Fluminense drew 0–0 with the Japan national team, drew 1–1 with Torino, and defeated the Senegal national team 7–0. Just over a month later, the team won the Paris Tournament again.

They won the Kiev Tournament in 1989. Bangu was invited at the last minute to replace Atlético de Madrid. Fluminense defeated them in a penalty shootout, 4–2. Other participants in this tournament included Dynamo Kyiv and Roma.

In 1988 and 1991, the team, even with technically weak but well-organized squads, reached the semifinals of the Campeonato Brasileiro. In the 1988 championship, they were eliminated by Bahia, after a 0–0 draw at the Maracanã and a 2–1 loss at the Fonte Nova Stadium, which on that day received the largest attendance in its history (110,438 spectators). In 1991, Fluminense was eliminated by Bragantino. They lost 1–0 at the Maracanã in front of 74,781 spectators and drew 1–1 in Bragança Paulista after already being eliminated. The Bragantino team consisted of many Fluminense athletes who participated in the club's fifth Copa São Paulo de Futebol Júnior title in 1989. Among them was forward Franklin, who scored Bragantino's goals in these two matches.

In the 1992 Copa do Brasil, Fluminense reached the final against Internacional, winning the first leg 2–1 at the Estádio das Laranjeiras, and losing the second leg 1–0 at the Beira-Rio with a very controversial penalty awarded in the 42nd minute of the second half. The tricolor players would return to Rio de Janeiro on the same flight as referee José Aparecido de Oliveira, but caused a disturbance that prevented him from boarding the aircraft.

They also qualified for three years to contest the Copa CONMEBOL, one of the tournaments that preceded the current Copa Sudamericana. In 1992, after beating Atlético-MG 2–1, they lost the second leg 5–1; in 1993, they beat the same opponent from the previous year 2–0 at home and were defeated by the same score in Belo Horizonte, losing on penalties; and, in 1996, they lost to Guaraní 3–1 in Asunción and drew, in Rio de Janeiro, 2–2.

Fluminense won in 1994 the Maceió Tournament, contested against the Alagoan clubs CRB and CSA.

The team did not win another relevant title until 1995, when they won the final of the Campeonato Carioca, a Fla-Flu match attended by 120,418 people (109,204 of whom were ticketed attendees). Renato Gaúcho scored the winning goal, making the final score 3–2. That same year, Fluminense also reached the semifinals of the Campeonato Brasileiro. In the 1995 state championship, Fluminense played 27 matches, with seventeen wins, 7 draws, 3 defeats, 48 goals for and 18 against, the year of Flamengo's centenary as a club (not as a football team), and the red-and-black team had invested heavily to win the championship, but in the 4 Fla-Flus played, Fluminense won 3 and drew 1. In the 1995 Campeonato Brasileiro, Fluminense finished fourth, eliminated in the semifinals by Santos (4–1 and 2–5).

On 16 December 1995, Fluminense officially inaugurated the Vale das Laranjeiras Training Center, aiming at the formation of its youth teams, naming it after its former president, Sylvio Kelly dos Santos, although the facility had already been in use since 30 April 1983.

From 1996 to 1999, Fluminense experienced the worst period in its history. Fluminense lost its sponsor at the end of 1995.

In 1996, Fluminense finished the Campeonato Brasileiro in second-to-last place (ahead only of Bragantino), but a refereeing scandal, known as the Ivens Mendes Case, which involved two other Série A clubs, Athletico Paranaense and Corinthians, canceled the relegations of 1996, leading to two clubs from Série B being promoted to the 1997 Campeonato Brasileiro, which ended up being contested by 26 clubs. Fluminense ended up being relegated again in 1997 to the Campeonato Brasileiro Série B, and in 1998 the team was relegated once more, now to the Campeonato Brasileiro Série C.

Despite a difficult year in football, the Tricolor women's basketball team won the 1998 Brazilian Women's Basketball Championship. Hortência Marcari, a former player, was the team's director. The packed Ginásio do Tijuca Tênis Clube, a 4,000-seat gymnasium, hosted the event. Another 3,000 people unable to buy tickets watched from outside.

The team won the Série C and began restructuring to develop great players and win significant titles once again. By the end of 1998, the team was showing signs of getting back on track, by winning the Copa Rio, a state competition that for the last time that year featured the presence of the major Carioca clubs, by beating São Cristóvão 4–0 in the final. Fluminense won all nine matches, scoring 24 goals and allowing only four. Fluminense won the 1999 Campeonato Brasileiro Série C by defeating Náutico at the Estádio dos Aflitos 2–1, with two goals from Roger for Fluminense, and Rogério Capixaba scoring for Náutico. Fluminense's campaign had 22 matches, with fourteen wins, 3 draws, and 5 defeats, 37 goals for and 21 against, and the tricolor top scorer in this competition was Roni, with six goals. That year, Fluminense hired coach Carlos Alberto Parreira. Under Parreira's leadership, the team won the Campeonato Brasileiro Série C and established the Vale das Laranjeiras, an enhancement of the existing youth soccer training center in the Xerém district of Duque de Caxias.

At the end of the century, three former Fluminense players were elected to the South American Team of the 20th Century by 250 journalists from around the world who were gathered to cover the 1998 FIFA World Cup: Carlos Alberto Torres, Didi, and Roberto Rivellino.

=== 2000–2006: The comeback ===
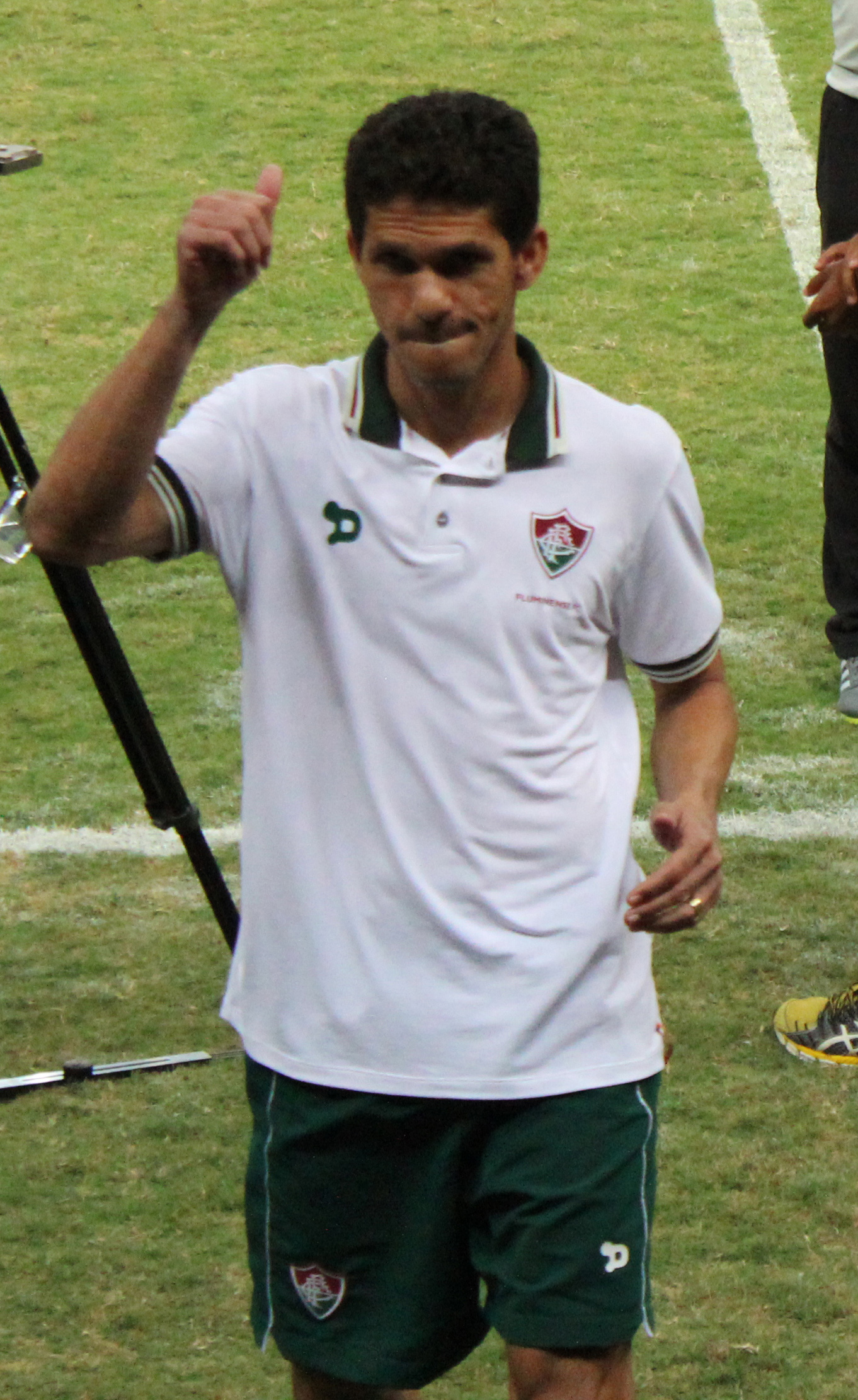
Magno Alves, a tricolor striker.

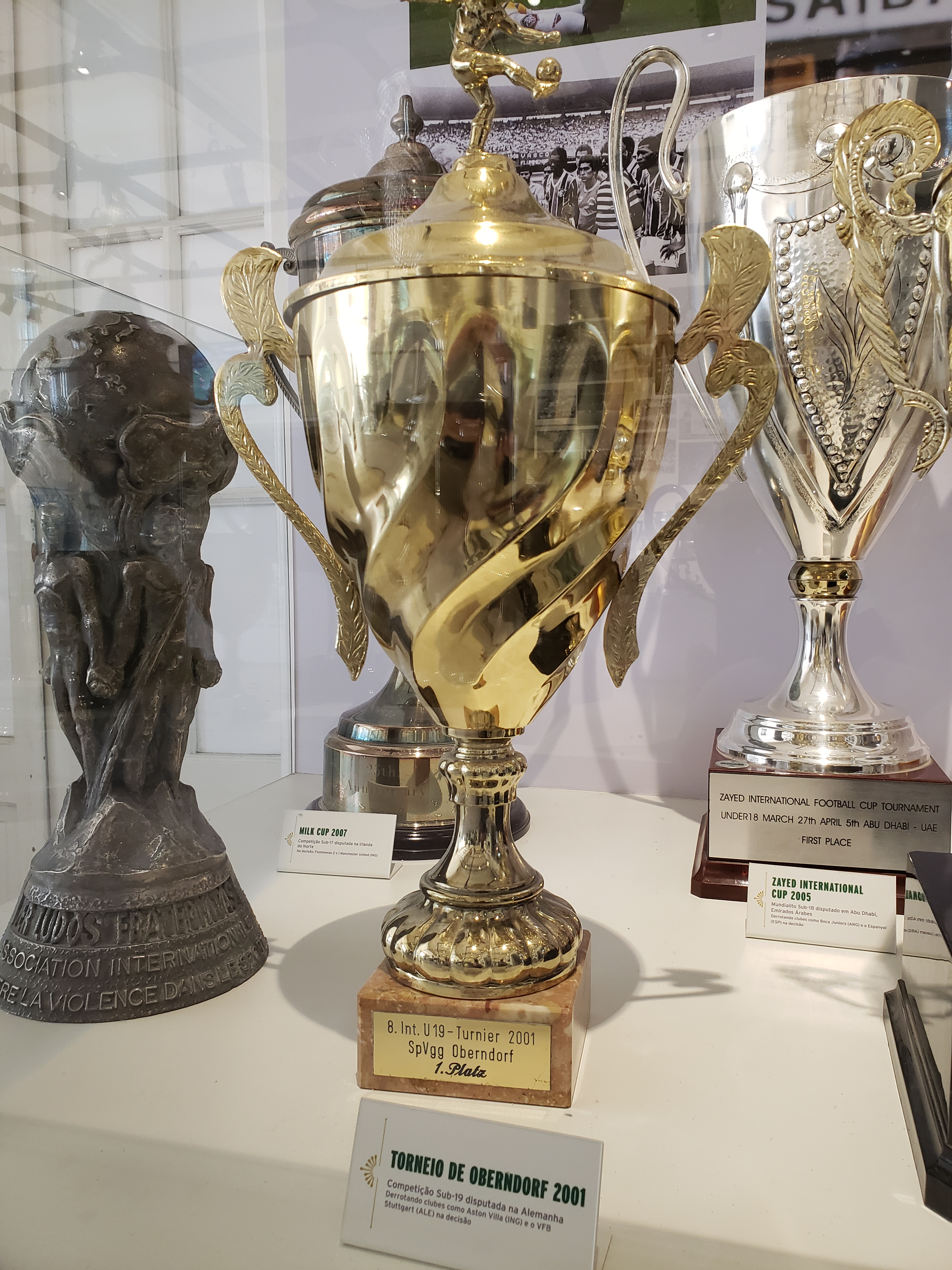
2001 Oberndorf Under-20 Tournament.

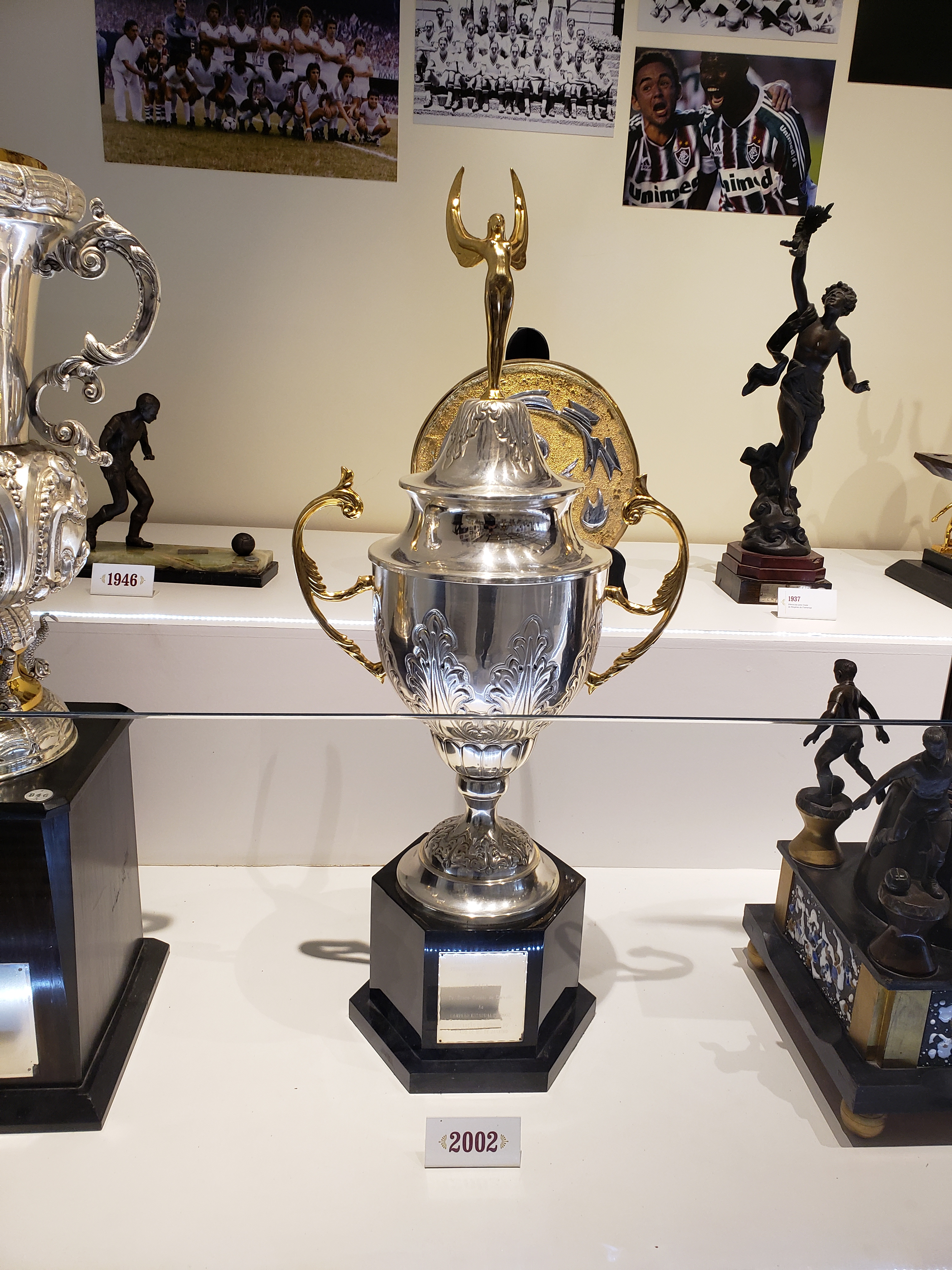
Trophy from the 2002 Campeonato Carioca.

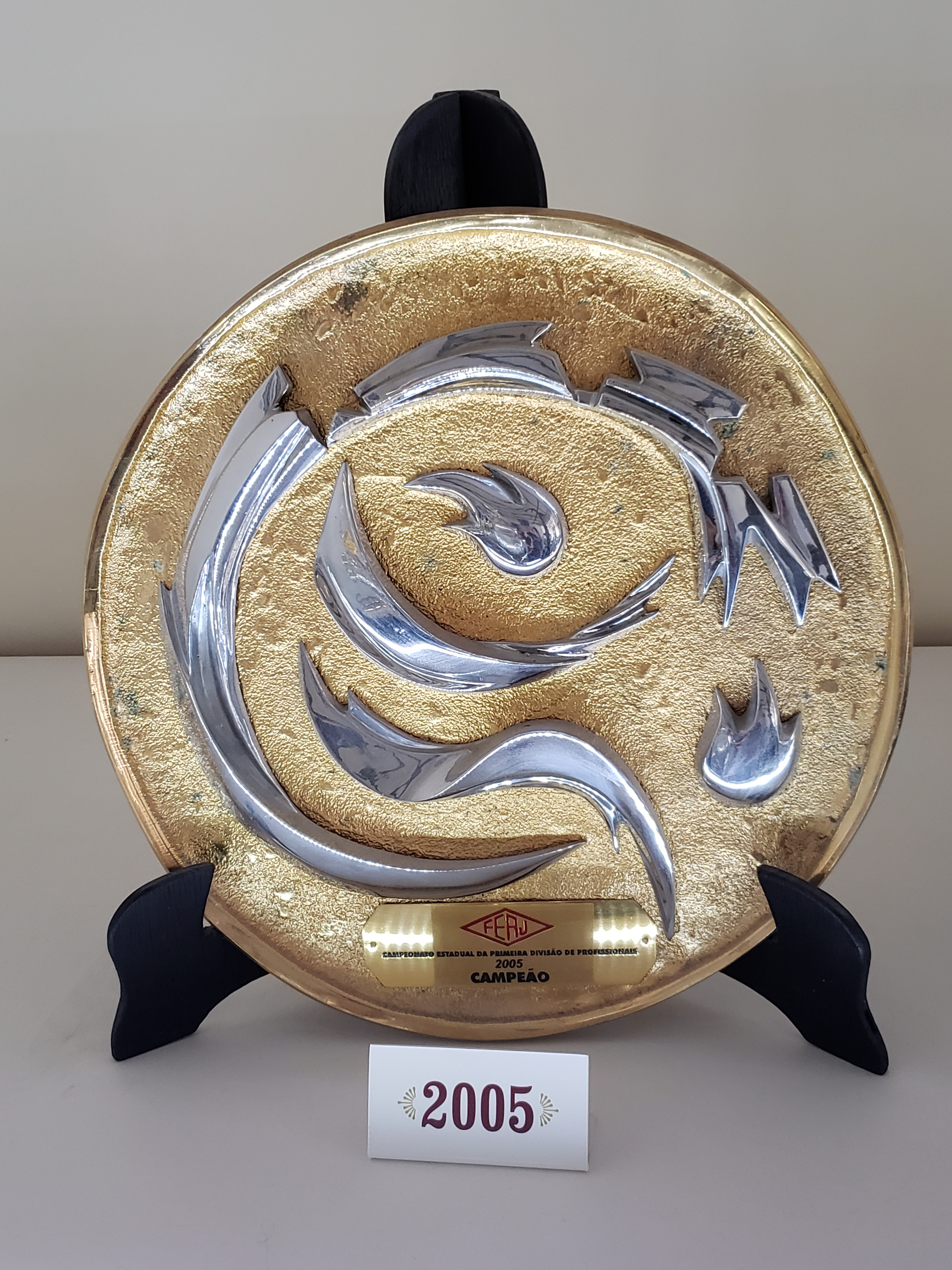
Trophy from the 2005 Campeonato Carioca.

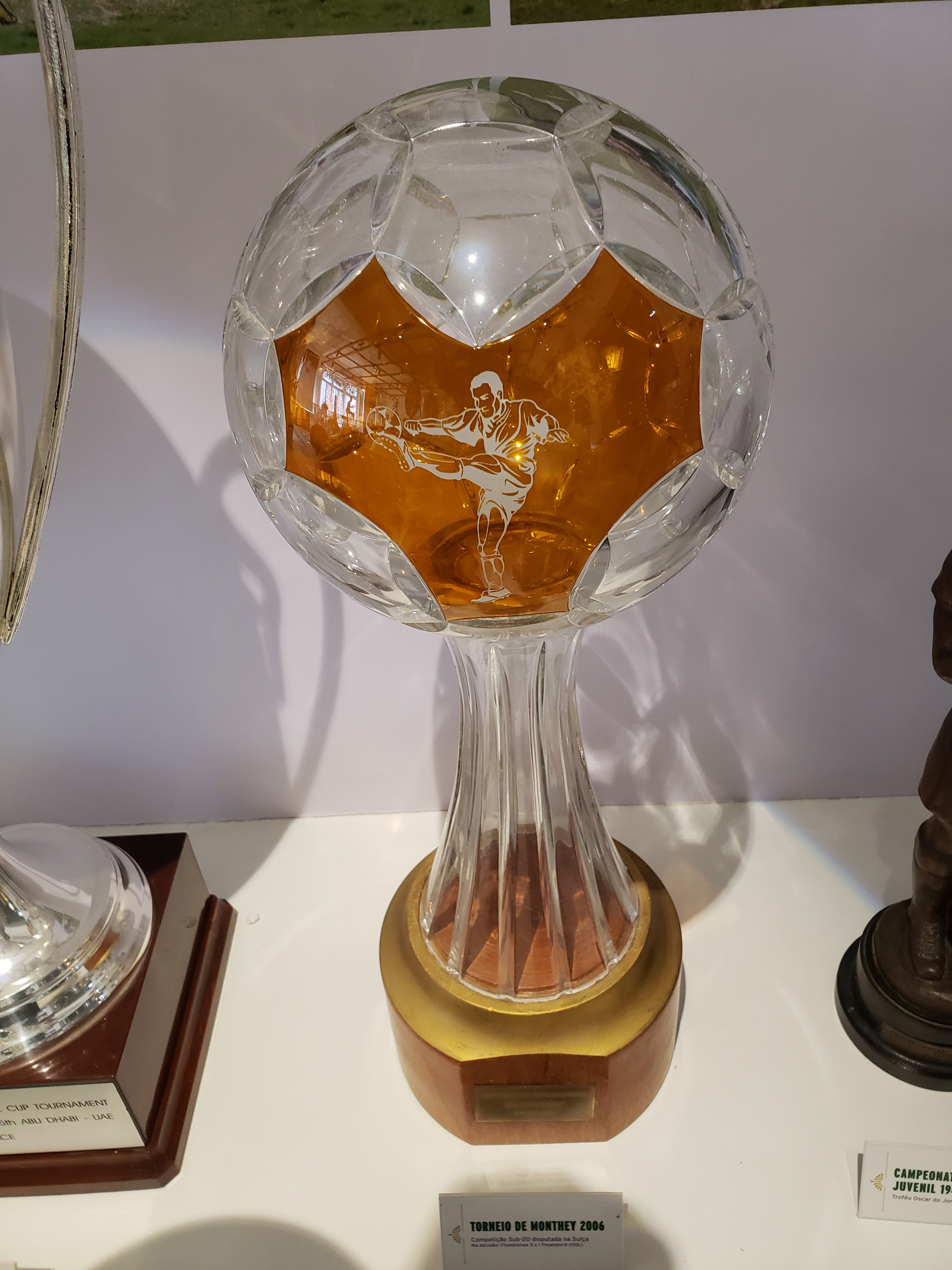
2006 Monthey Under-20 Tournament.

In 2000, a legal and political problem between Série A clubs called the Sandro Hiroshi Case prevented the organization of the Campeonato Brasileiro, leading to the creation of the Copa João Havelange by the Clube dos 13. The criterion for inviting clubs to participate in this championship was based on invitation. Fluminense, Bahia, and other clubs that were not in the first division at the time were included among the participants.

The team had a good participation and, after finishing third in the first phase, fell in the round of 16 of the competition against São Caetano, in front of 56,504 spectators, finishing this championship in ninth place. Just like São Caetano, which competed in the lower division and had the possibility to reach the final among the main clubs, Fluminense and Bahia remained in the first division the following year. In that year's Copa do Brasil, Fluminense finished fifth.

In the 2001 Torneio Rio-São Paulo, Fluminense finished in fourth place and in the 2001 Campeonato Brasileiro in third.

Fluminense won the 2002 Campeonato Carioca by defeating Americano 2–0 and 3–1 in the final matches. The latter match was watched by 26,663 spectators. The final stage was held during the 2002 FIFA World Cup, and the major clubs fielded their reserve teams in the initial phases because they were competing in the Torneio Rio-São Paulo.

Having become Carioca champion on 27 June, three days before the Brazil national team won the World Cup that year, the tricolor fans took the opportunity to celebrate the Carioca title in the year of Fluminense's centenary precisely on that day, and in many places in Rio de Janeiro, there were as many tricolor shirts as Brazilian ones on this festive day. The tricolor campaign in 28 matches had 14 wins, 5 draws, and 9 defeats, with 45 goals for and 33 against.

In 2002, Fluminense celebrated its centennial with major events throughout the year. The stamp commemorating the centennial, elected by popular vote, was promoted by Correios as the 2002 Stamp of the Year. Fans were thrilled by the signing of Romário, who shined in his debut in the Brazilian Championship against Cruzeiro. Fluminense won 5–1 in front of about 70,000 fans. They finished the championship in fourth place. Romário played well that year, scoring many goals. However, he had a conflict with the team's other top scorer, Magno Alves. Magno later left the club to play in South Korea and Japan. Over the years, Romário's performance declined, and he was not in good form in the 2003 Brazilian Championship.

In 2003, the Tricolor competed in the Copa Sudamericana for the first time. They beat Corinthians and Atlético-MG, both by a score of 2–0. However, they were eliminated in the second phase after losing to São Paulo 1–0 in São Paulo and drawing 1–1 in Rio de Janeiro.

Fluminense's best performance in 2004 was in the Campeonato Brasileiro, where they finished ninth.

Fluminense had great moments during 2005 and, after losing the first leg of the final to Volta Redonda 4–3, won the Campeonato Carioca with 70,830 spectators (63,762 of whom paid) attending the second final match where Fluminense won 3–1. Fluminense qualified for the finals against Volta Redonda, champion of the Taça Guanabara, by defeating Flamengo 4–1 in the Taça Rio match in front of 74,650 spectators (65,672 of whom paid) with a great performance. In this championship, in 15 matches Fluminense obtained 8 wins, 3 draws, and 4 defeats, with forty goals for and 22 against.

In 2005, Fluminense also reached their second Copa do Brasil final, losing the title to Paulista de Jundiaí after a 0–0 draw, with the match being played at São Januário Stadium in front of 25,000 spectators, as the Maracanã was under renovation, just as had happened in 1992, when Fluminense did not have the opportunity to use the Maracanã in the Copa do Brasil, the stadium where they play most of their matches. Fluminense was missing several players, so they fielded reserves in the first leg of the final, losing 2–0 to Paulista in Jundiaí. In the Brazilian Championship, the team finished fifth.

In that year's Copa Sudamericana, Fluminense also had a good campaign, only falling in the quarter-finals to Universidad Católica, whom they beat 2–1 in Rio de Janeiro, losing 2–0 in Santiago. In six matches in the Copa Sudamericana, Fluminense had three wins, one draw, and two losses, with eight goals for and seven against.

Despite having a strong squad, Fluminense suffered from serious management issues in 2006 due to inadequate planning. The club changed coaches six times, resulting in an unsatisfactory performance in professional football similar to that of 2003. After the grand celebrations of its centenary the previous year, Fluminense began preparing later than other successful clubs and had numerous injury problems due to inadequate physical preparation. The club's management later attempted to address these issues.

In 2006, in the Copa Sudamericana, they played the first phase against Botafogo, qualifying on penalties after two 1–1 draws. In the next phase, Fluminense were eliminated by Gimnasia y Esgrima de La Plata, drawing the first match 1–1 and losing the next at the opponent's home field 2–0.

In the 4 Copa Sudamericana tournaments disputed by Brazilian clubs between 2003 and 2006, Fluminense competed in 3, tallying 5 wins, 5 draws, and 4 defeats, 18 goals for and 11 against, being until then the fourth Brazilian club with the most points in the history of this competition. The best tricolor campaign was in 2005, when they fell in the quarter-finals, finishing fifth. Until this last Copa Sudamericana match against Gimnasia, in the period between 1968 and 2006, Fluminense played 149 matches against foreign clubs or national teams (disregarding matches against Brazilian clubs abroad or in international competitions in these statistics), with 76 wins, 37 draws, 34 defeats, 291 goals for and 183 against.

=== 2007: The unprecedented conquest of the Copa do Brasil ===
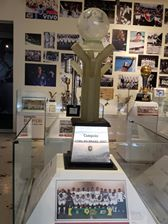
2007 Copa do Brasil.

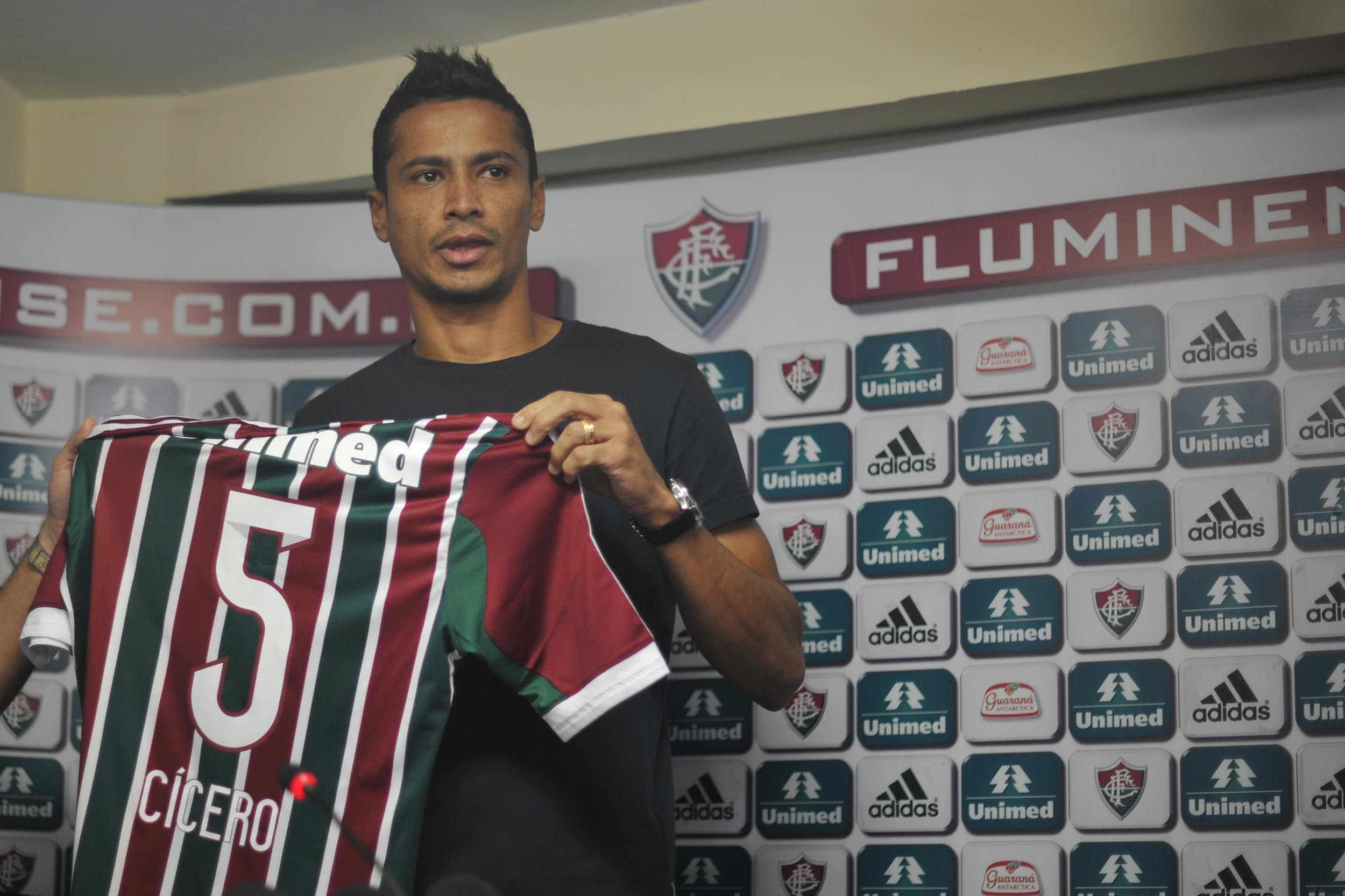
Cícero, a standout player in the 2007 Copa do Brasil.

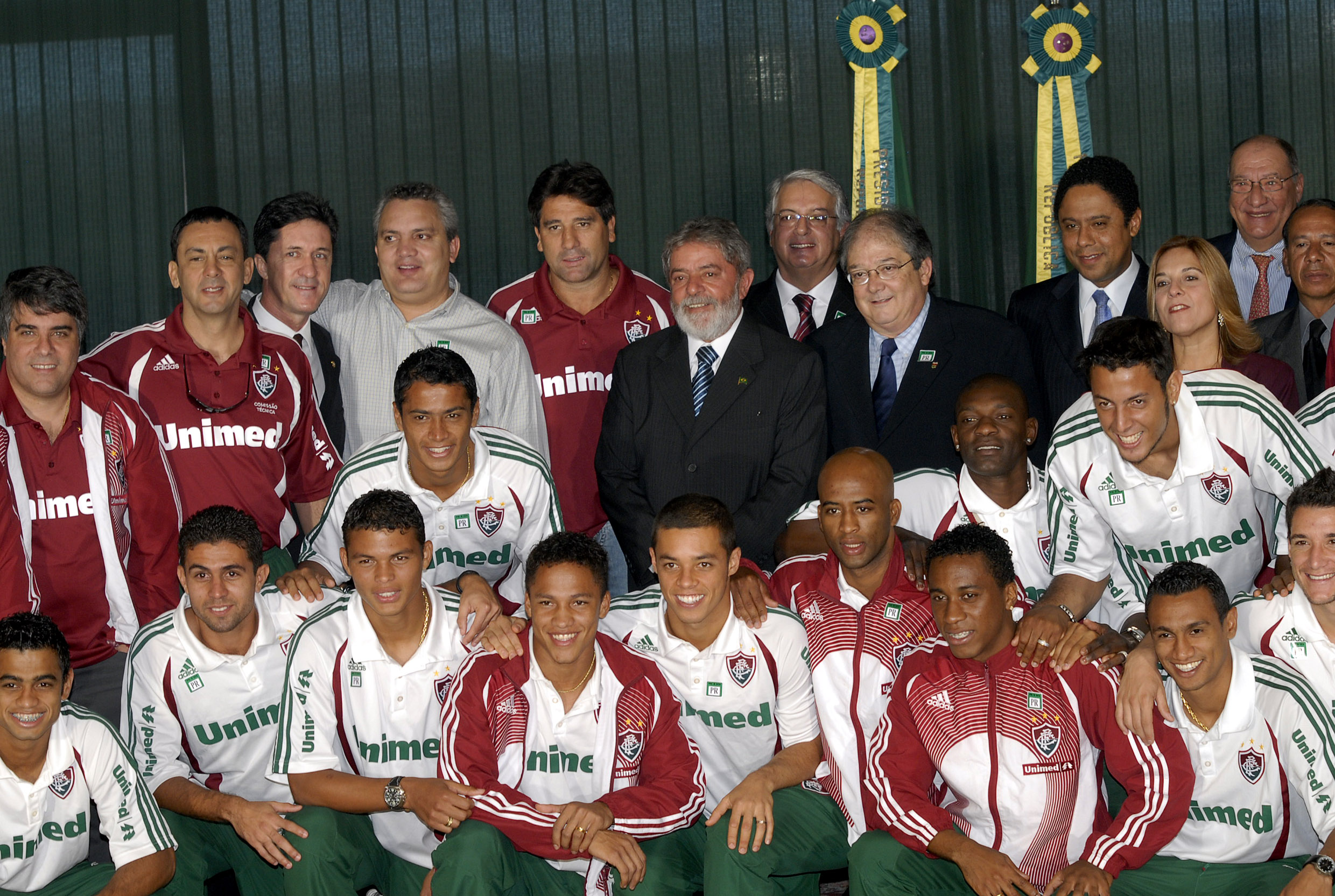
The Fluminense team in 2007.

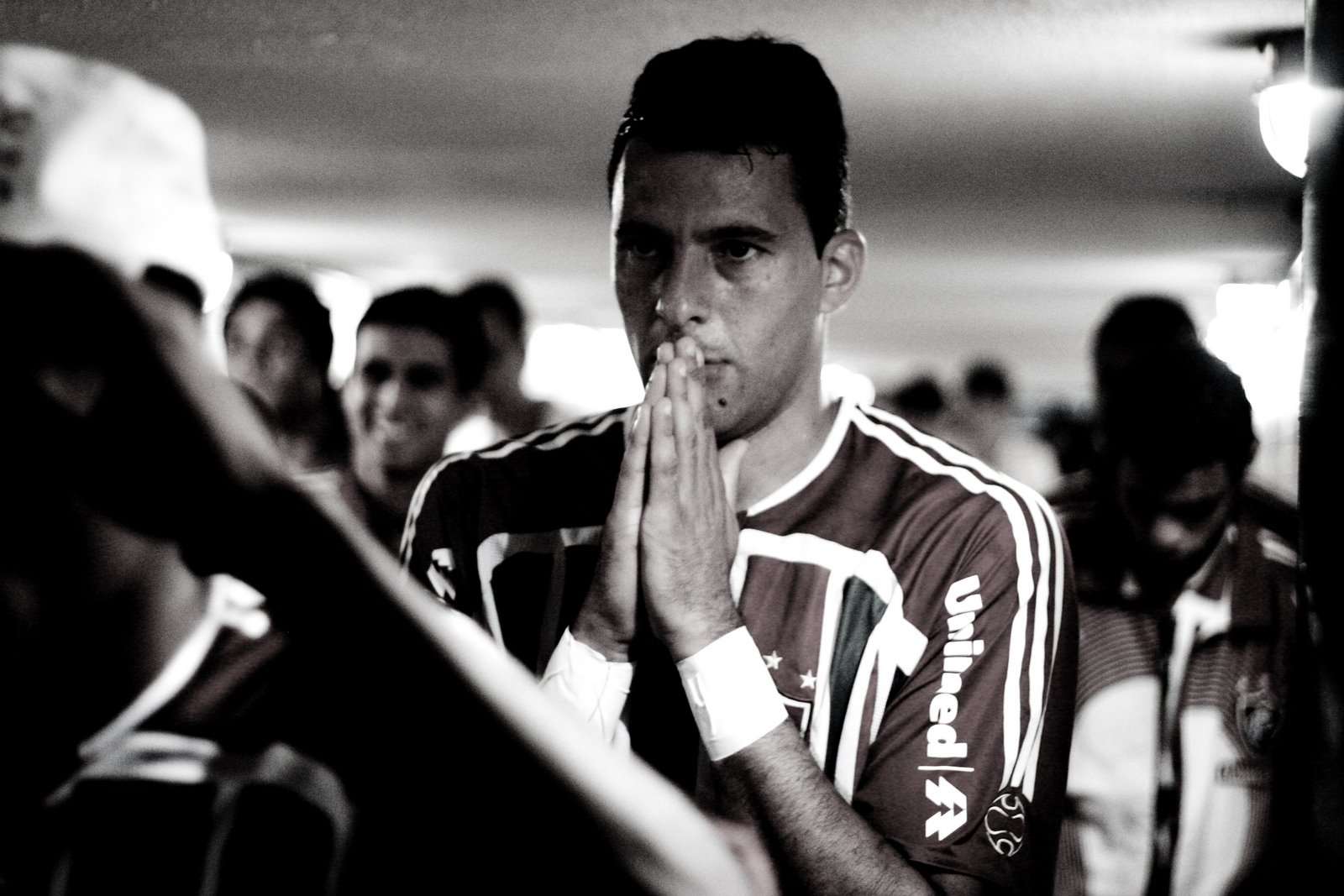
Washington preparing for the 2008 Copa Libertadores finals.

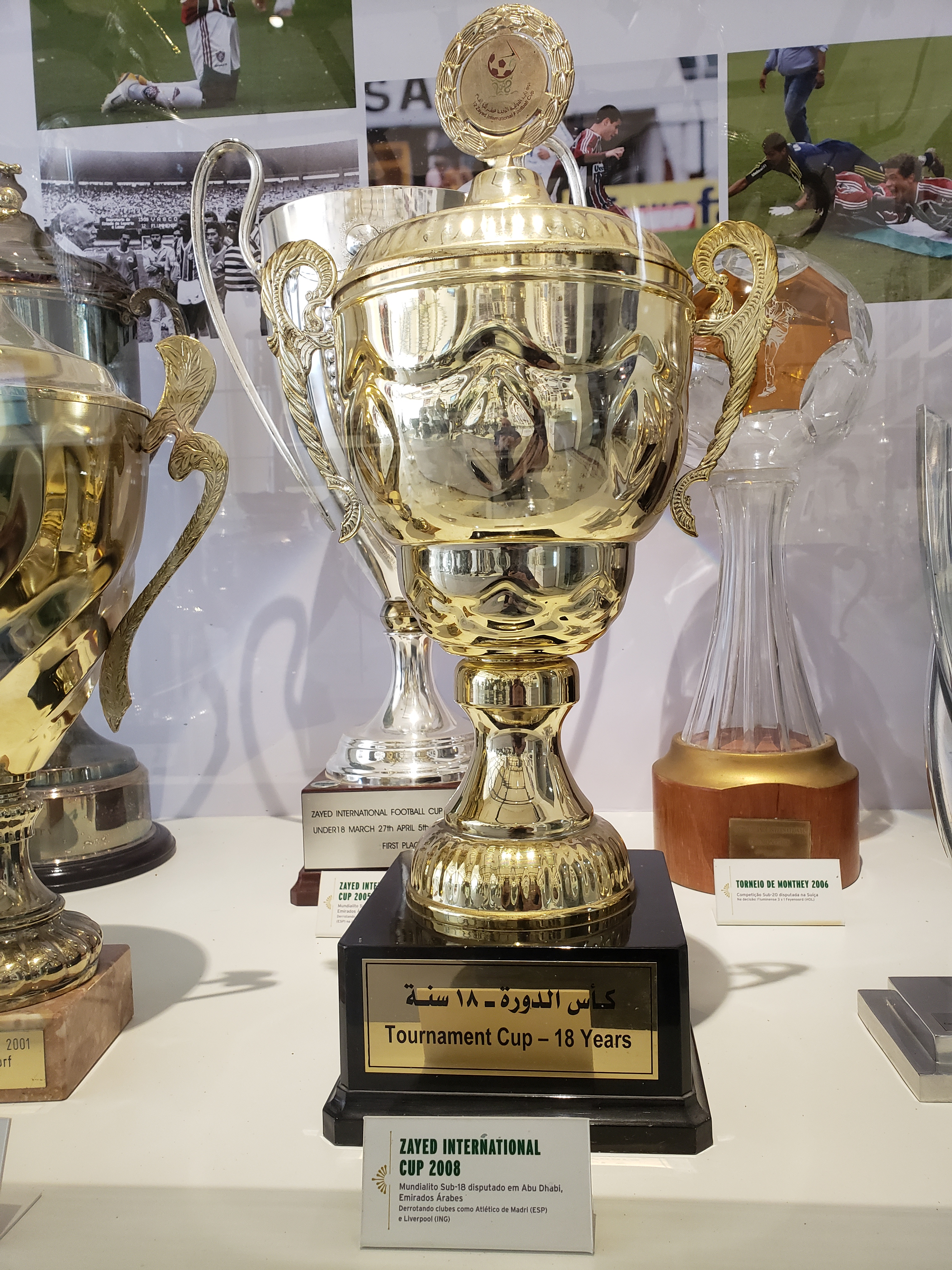
Trophy of the 2008 Zayed International Under-19 Tournament.

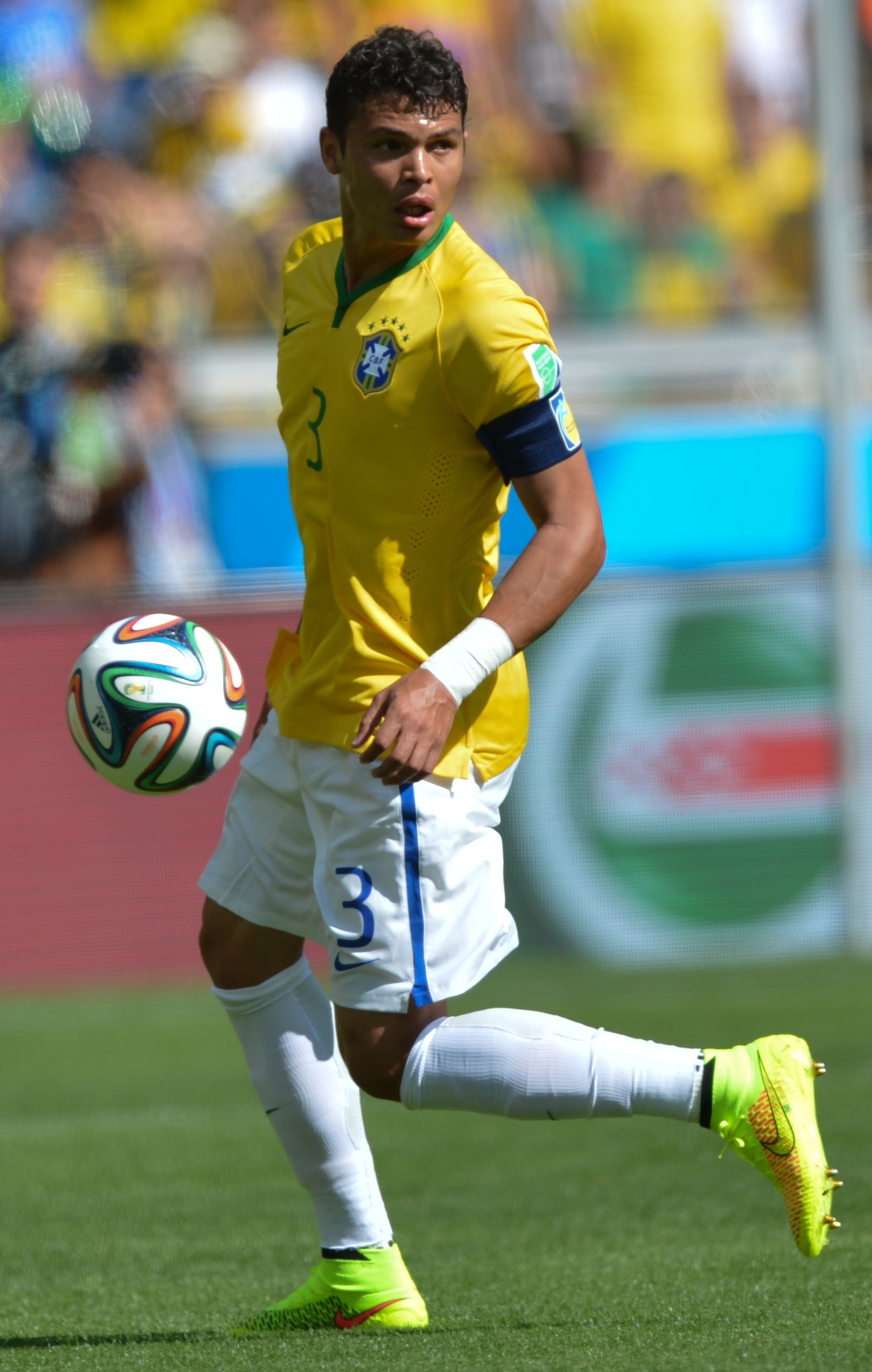
Thiago Silva.

Fluminense rebuilt their team in 2007 and after a poor Campeonato Carioca reached their third Copa do Brasil final, this time becoming champions against Figueirense, by winning the second leg of the final 1–0 in Florianópolis (with a goal from Roger), after drawing the first decisive match 1–1 in Rio de Janeiro. All 64,669 tickets for the Maracanã sold out 48 hours in advance. At the time, the stadium was completing renovations to become part of the 2007 Pan American Games sports complex and had not yet reached its full capacity of approximately 90,000 spectators.

To earn the title of Copa do Brasil champion, Fluminense defeated ADESG (2–1 and 6–0), América de Natal (0–1 and 2–1), Bahia (1–1 and 2–2), Atlético-PR (1–1 and 1–0), Brasiliense (4–2 and 1–1), and Figueirense (1–1 and 1–0). They then qualified for the 2008 Copa Libertadores. Adriano Magrão and Alex Dias were the tricolor top scorers in this competition, with four goals each. At the end of the 2007 Copa do Brasil, Fluminense totaled 91 matches in the history of this competition, with 48 wins, 26 draws, and 18 defeats, 166 goals for and 103 against, having been present in 14 editions, this being the seventh-best performance among the clubs that had contested the second most important tournament in Brazil until 2007. The biggest tricolor wins until then were 6–0 against ADESG in the 2007 campaign and by the same score against Maranhão Atlético Clube on 4 May 2000.

On May 12, 2007, the Rio de Janeiro City Council approved a law declaring July 21 as Fluminense and Tricolor Day. This day is not coincidental; it is the day the club was founded.

In the 2007 Campeonato Brasileiro, Fluminense finished in fourth place, this being the ninth time the Tricolor finished among the top four in this championship, the best performance of a club from the State of Rio de Janeiro in this regard. Considering the Torneio Roberto Gomes Pedrosa, the precursor to this championship, this would be the tenth time. Thiago Neves, their number 10, won the Golden Ball from Placar magazine, as the best player of this edition, in which Thiago Silva was also elected, in this case as one of the defenders for the championship's best XI.

Having finished the 2008 Campeonato Carioca in third place, Fluminense was the club that amassed the most points among all participants in the 2008 Copa Libertadores in the first phase of this competition, qualifying to play the second leg of the subsequent knockout phases at the Maracanã.

=== 2008–2009: Runners-up in the Copa Libertadores and Copa Sudamericana ===
In the second stage, Fluminense overcame L.D.U. Quito (Ecuador, 0–0 and 1–0), Arsenal de Sarandí (Argentina, 6–0 – the biggest win by a Brazilian club over an Argentine team in Libertadores history – and 0–2), and Libertad (Paraguay, 2–1 and 2–0). In the round of 16, they eliminated Atlético Nacional (Colombia, 2–1 and 1–0), and in the quarterfinals, São Paulo (Brazil, 0–1 and 3–1), when an audience of 72,910 people attended the Maracanã, 68,191 of whom paid, to see one of the most memorable matches of the tournament where Fluminense were winning 2–1, a scoreline that favored the Paulista team, Washington headed in a goal in the 46th minute of the 2nd half, thus qualifying Fluminense. In the semifinals, Fluminense faced Boca Juniors. They obtained a 2–2 draw in the first leg in Buenos Aires and a 3–1 victory in the second leg at the Maracanã in front of 84,632 spectators (78,856 of whom were paying). This qualified them for the final against LDU. The two teams had already played each other in the first phase of the competition in a group that the international press called the "Group of Death" due to the competitiveness of the participating clubs.

In the first leg of the finals, at the Estadio La Casa Blanca in Quito, LDU defeated Fluminense 4–2. While awaiting the July 2 match at the Maracanã, all 78,918 tickets went on sale on June 23 and sold out within hours, breaking the Brazilian record for revenue in club matches with 3,910,044 reais raised from ticket sales alone. In front of 86,027 spectators, Fluminense defeated their opponent 3–1. Thiago Neves scored three goals, becoming the first player to do so in a Libertadores final. The match went to penalties, where Fluminense was defeated 3–1. This final is considered the highest scoring in Copa Libertadores history, with 10 goals scored in two games. Despite the loss, the team received unconditional support from their fans, given their excellent performance in the most important championship for South American clubs. Notably, Fluminense went from the third division to the Copa Libertadores final in nine years, restoring the club's prestige, except for a brief period in the late 1990s.

In the 2008 Campeonato Brasileiro, having chosen to play half the championship with the reserve team to prioritize the Copa Libertadores, the team fought against relegation until the penultimate round, where they managed a 1–1 draw with São Paulo at the Morumbi, ending any possibility of relegation. In the last round, the Tricolor fans brought 51,172 spectators against Ipatinga (MG), to see the farewell of Thiago Silva, affectionately called "O monstro" ("monster") by the fans due to his grit on the field. With the 1–1 draw, Fluminense finished the championship in 14th place, qualifying for the 2009 Copa Sudamericana, and their forward Washington finished as top scorer of this edition of the Campeonato Brasileiro, with 21 goals.

Their defender, Thiago Silva, was voted the best center back in the 2008 Brazilian Championship. He also won the "Craque da Galera" award, which was established by Globoesporte.com, as the best player in the championship. He was elected by popular vote, receiving 1,252,073 votes — about 47% of the total.

In 2009, Fluminense had an irregular campaign due to successive coach changes and the constant arrival of new players during competitions. They finished fourth in the Campeonato Carioca but made history in the Copa do Brasil by becoming the eighth club to play 100 matches in the competition. They had 51 wins, 29 draws, and 20 losses, scoring 179 goals and conceding 111. In the 2–2 draw against Corinthians, who would win the competition, 68,158 spectators were present. Fluminense finished sixth in the competition.

=== 2009–2012: The "Team of Warriors" makes history ===
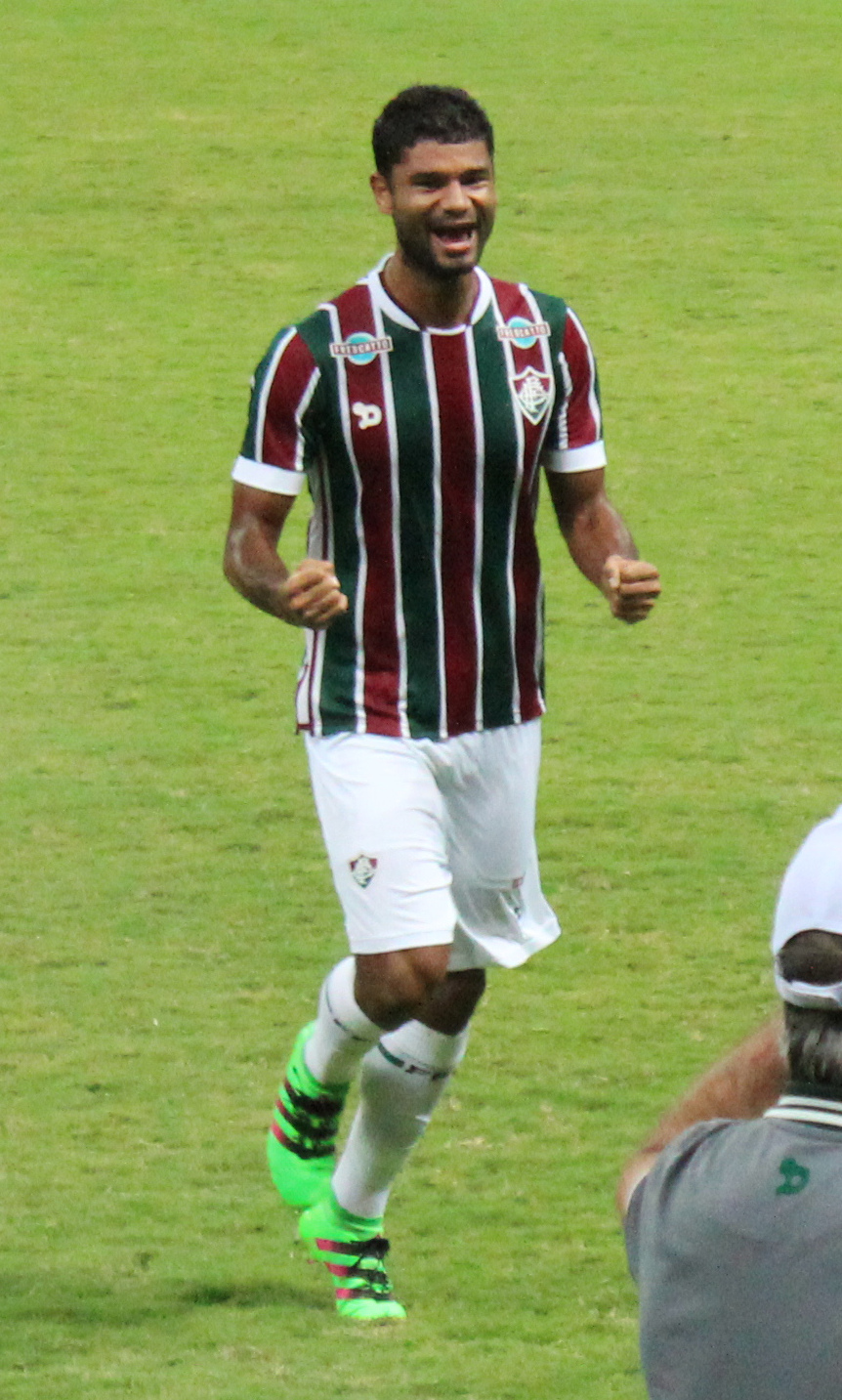
Gum.

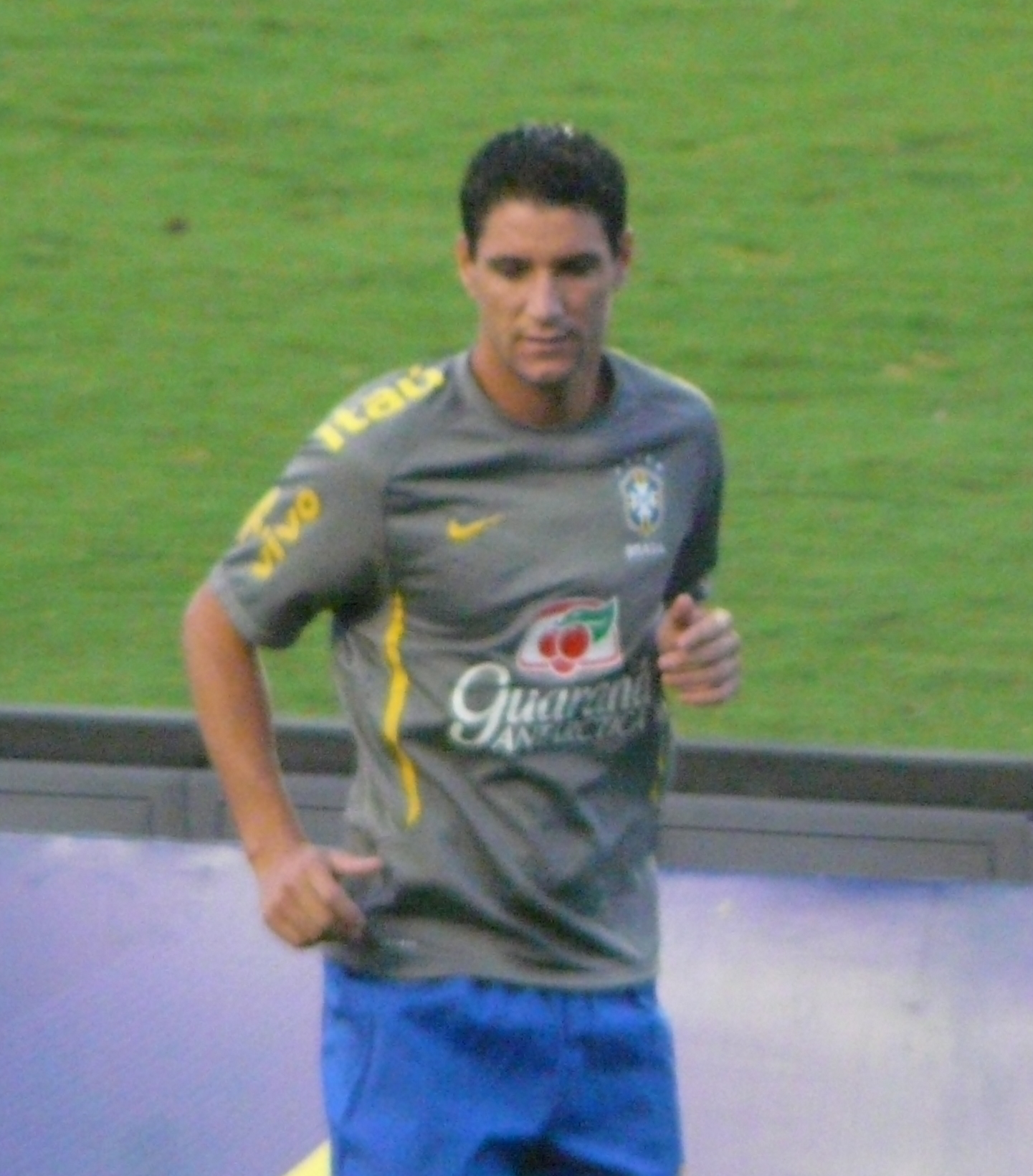
Thiago Neves with the Brazilian National Team.

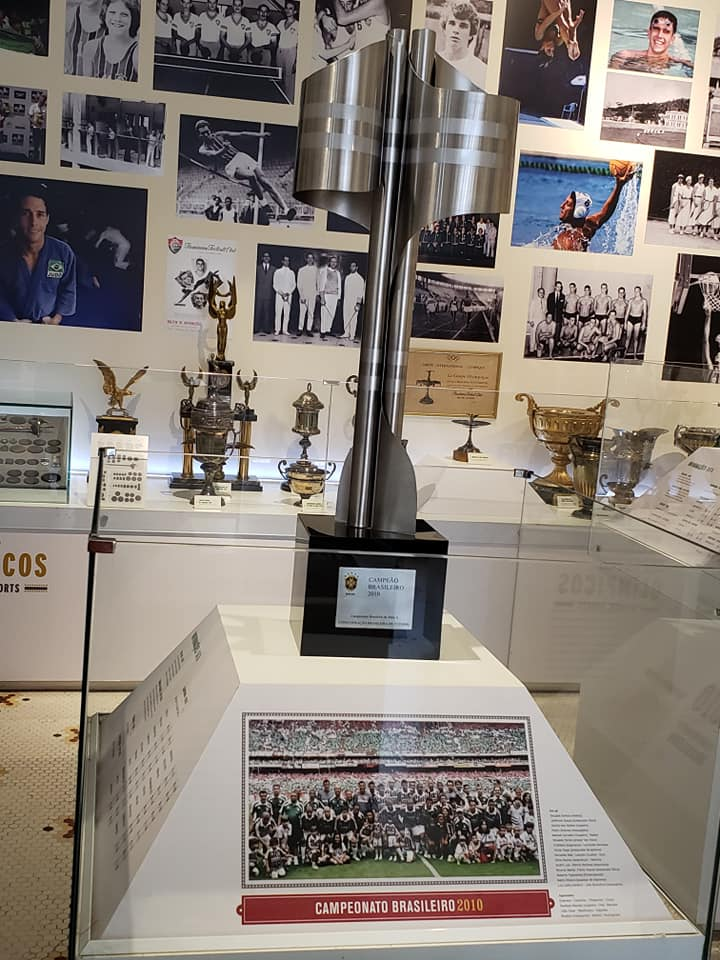
Trophy from the 2010 Campeonato Brasileiro Série A.

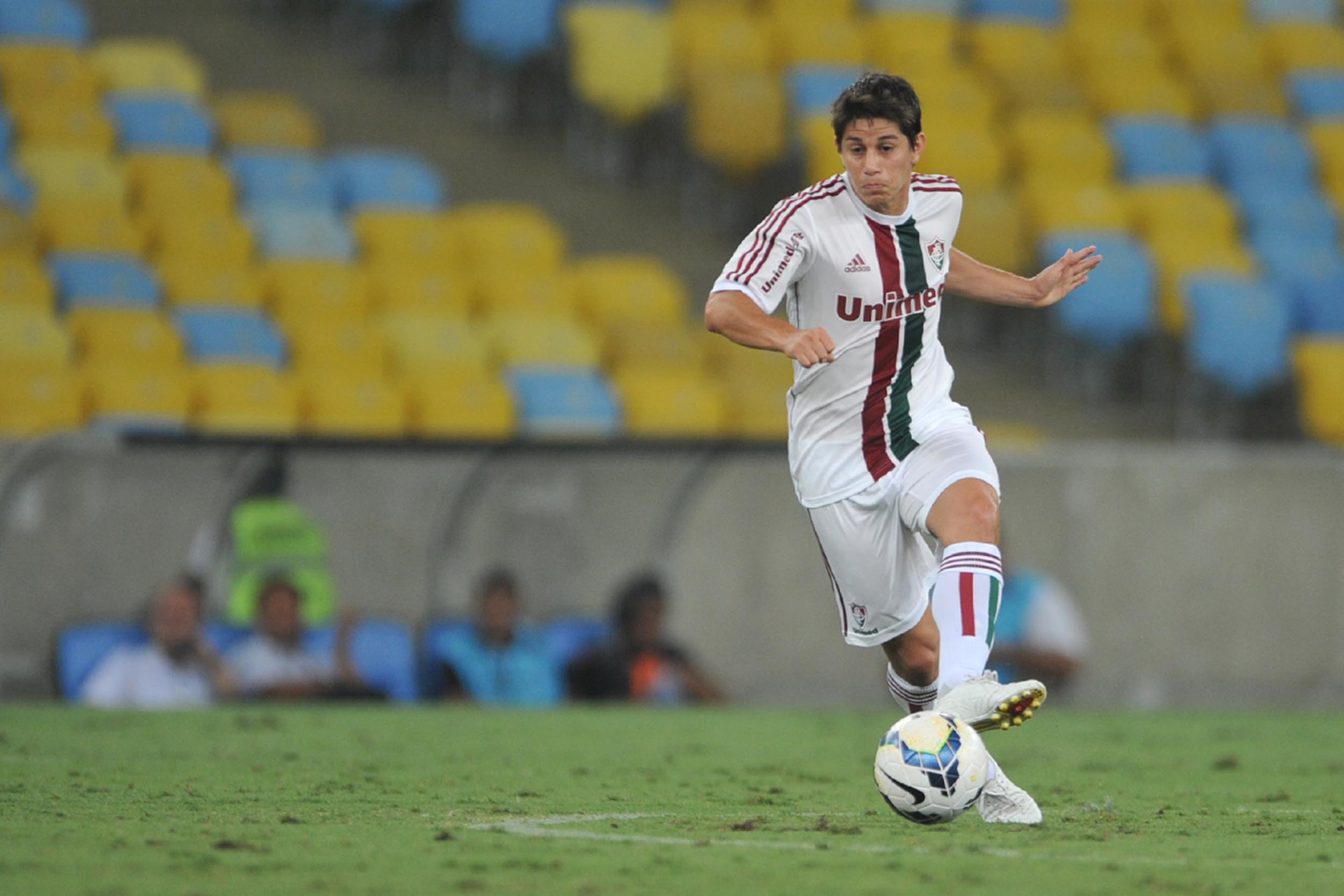
Darío Conca.

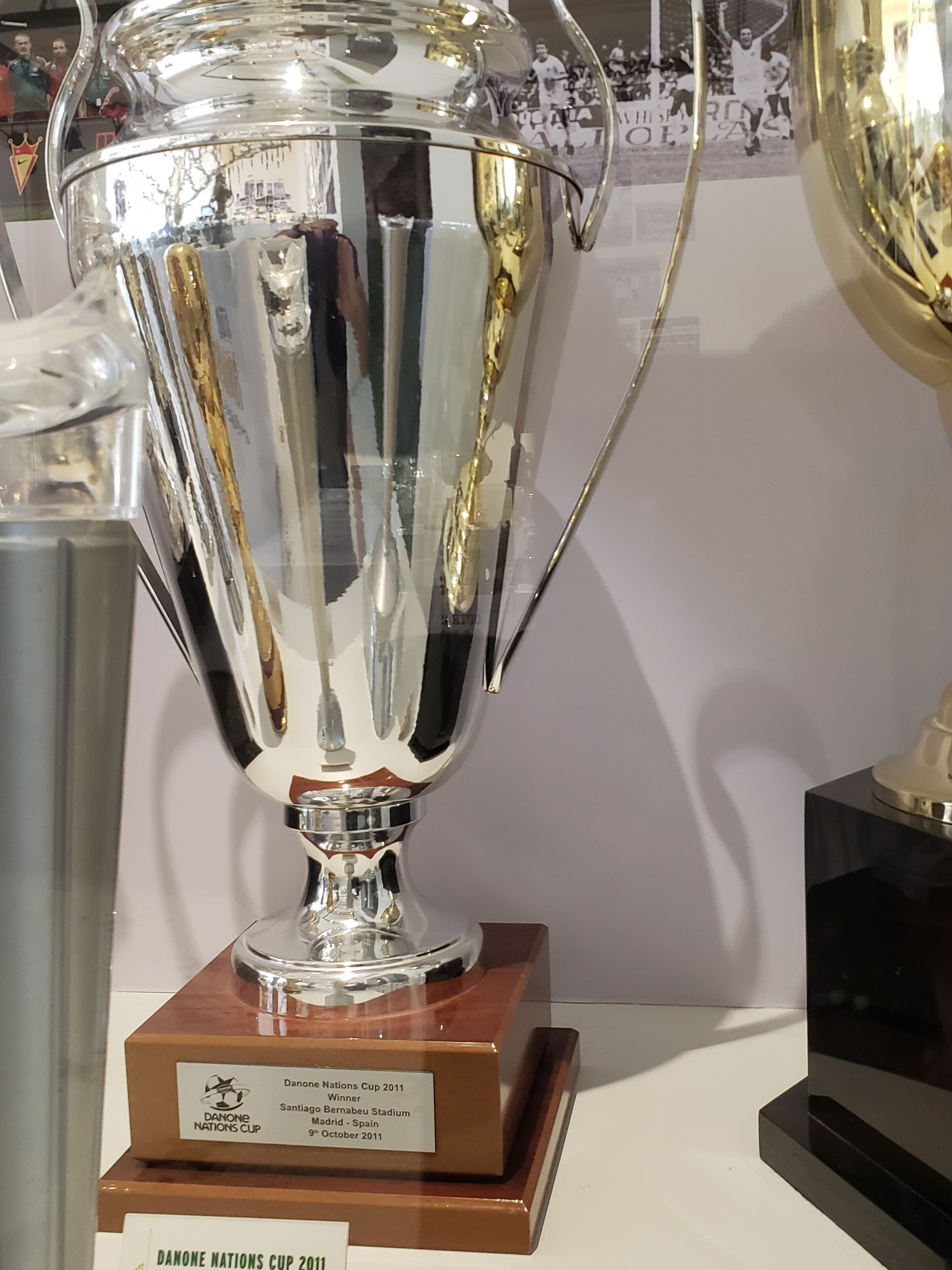
Trophy from the 2011 Danone Nations Cup Under-13 Tournament.

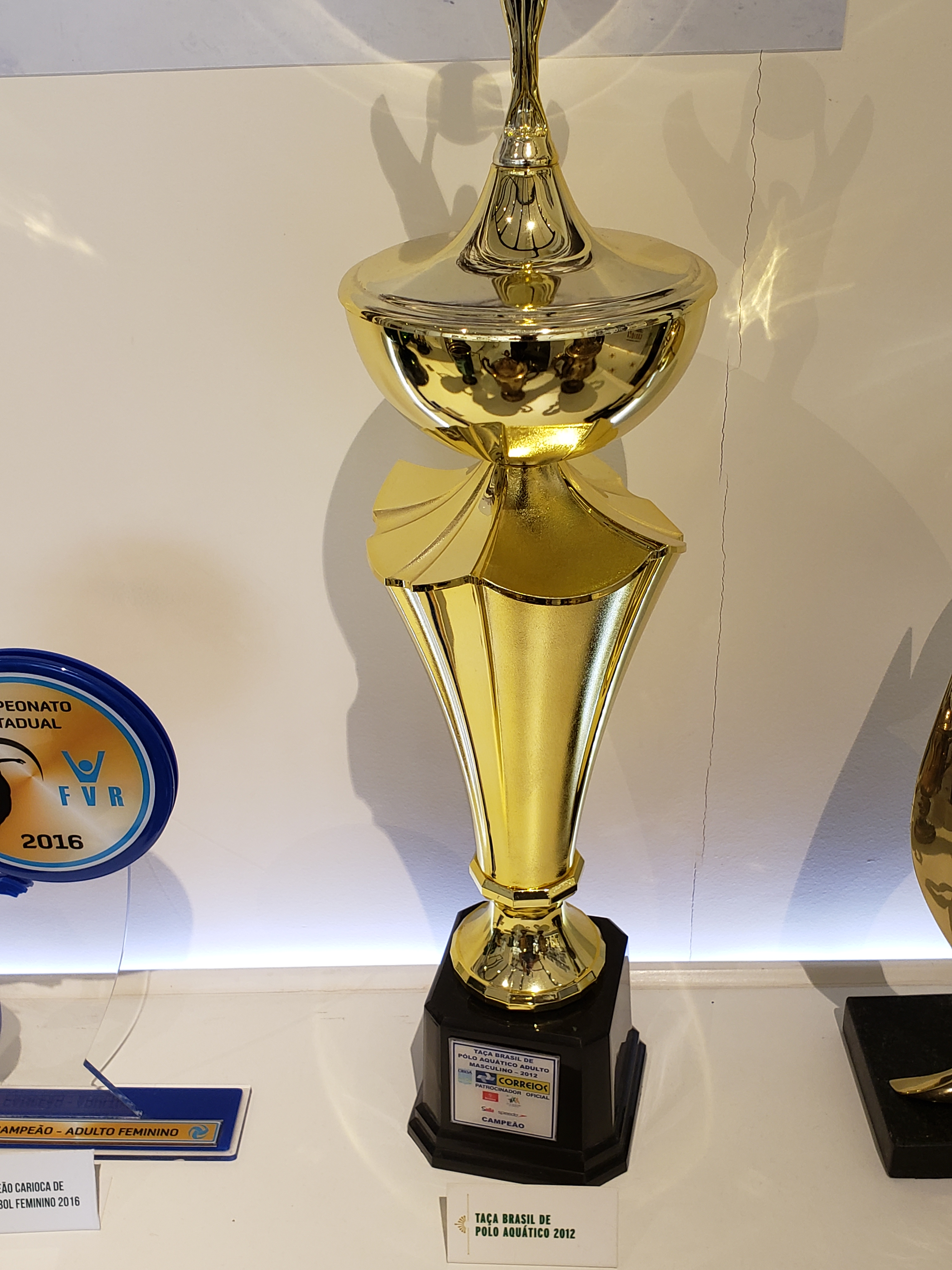
2012 Brazil Water Polo Cup Trophy.

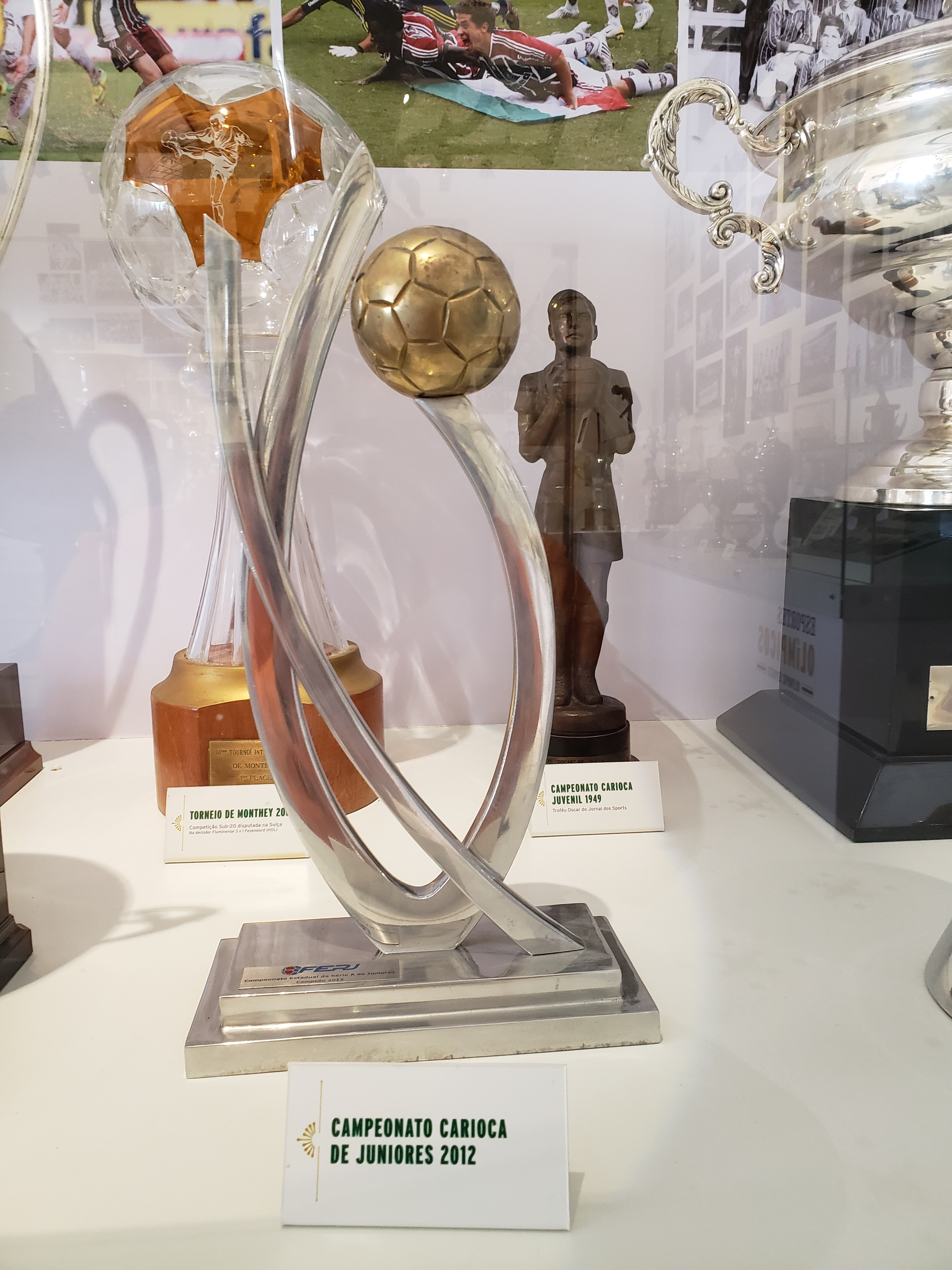
Trophy from the 2012 Rio de Janeiro Under-20 Football Championship Cup

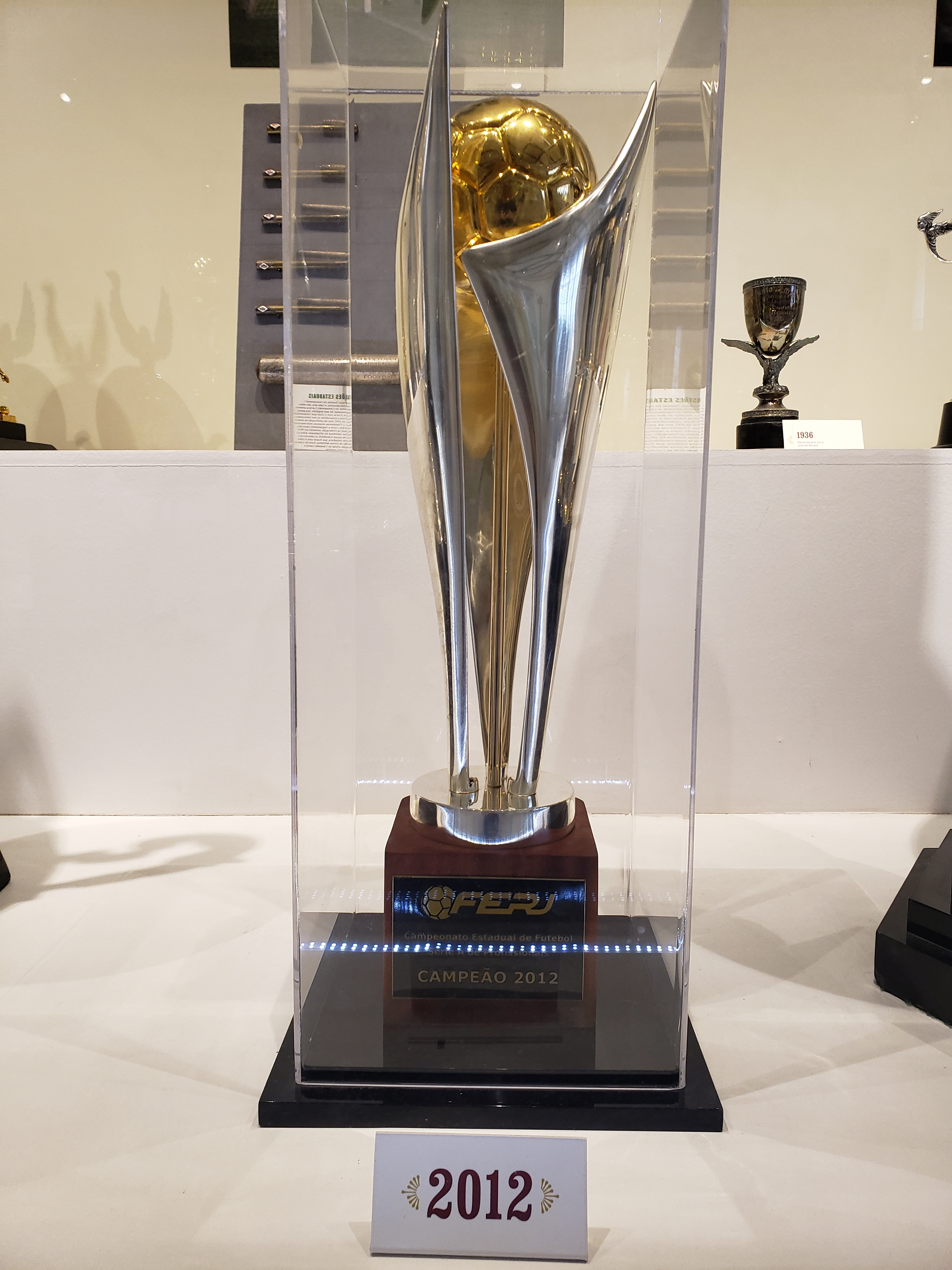
Trophy from the 2012 Campeonato Carioca.

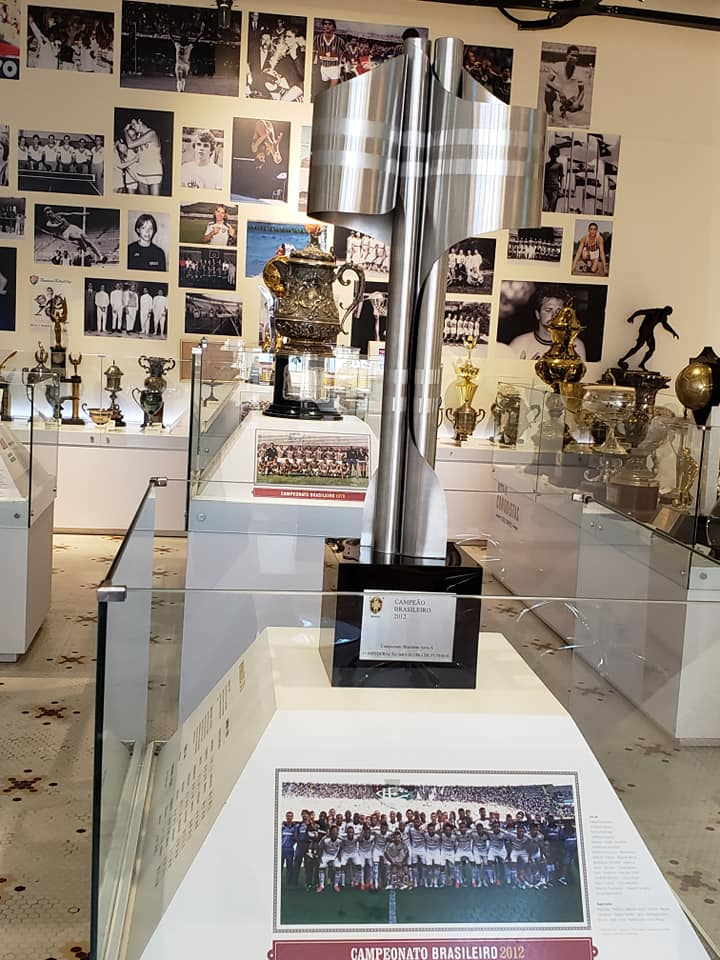
Trophy from the 2012 Campeonato Brasileiro Série A.

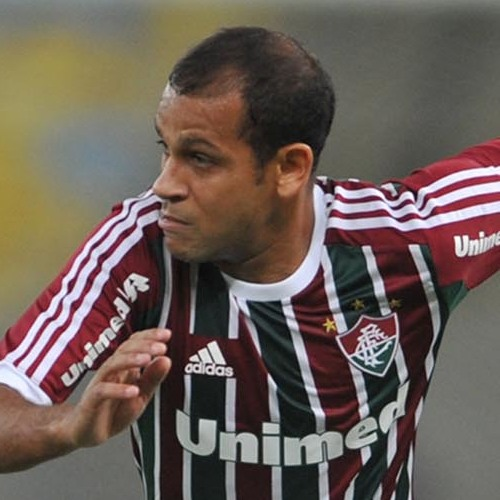
Carlinhos.

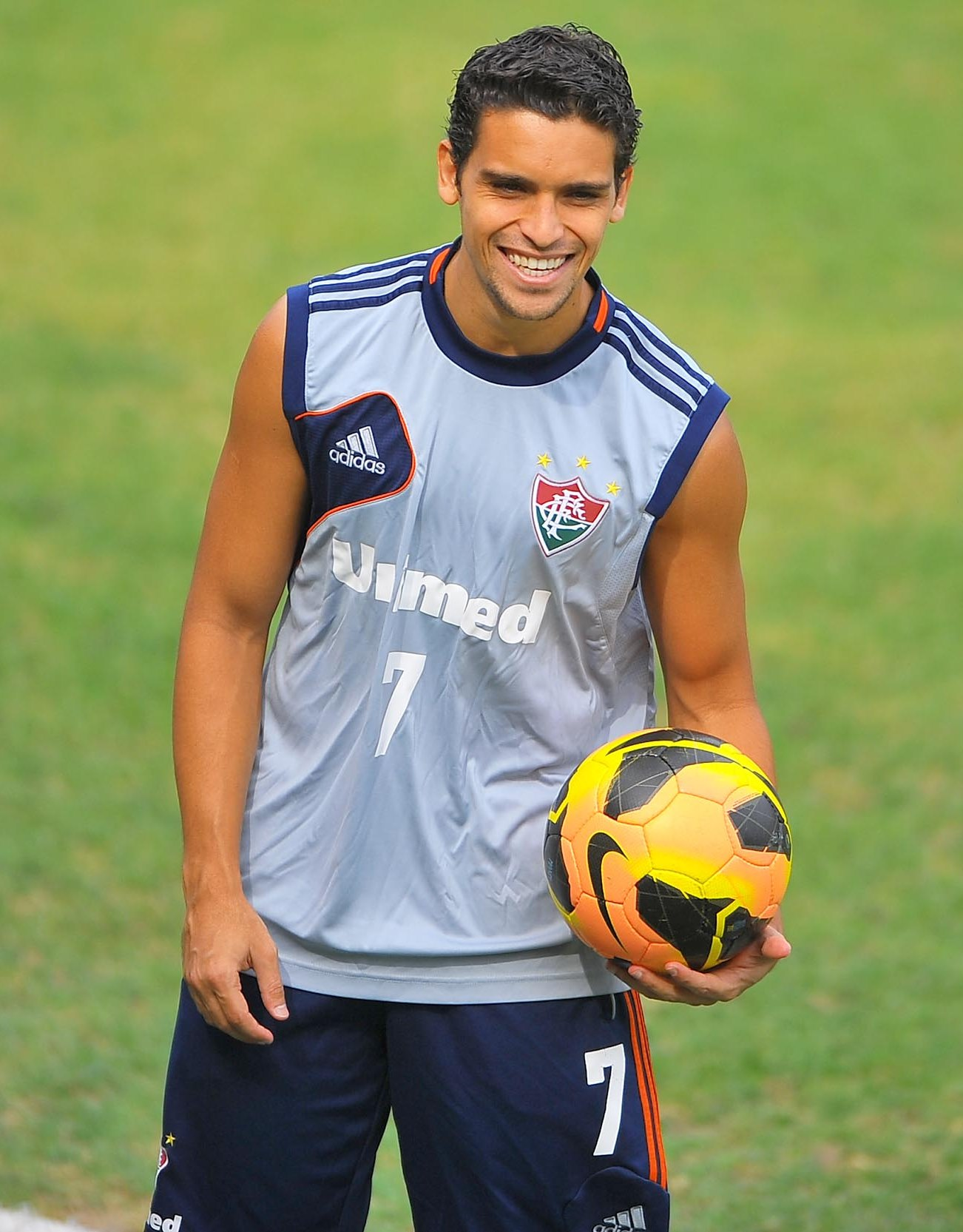
Jean.

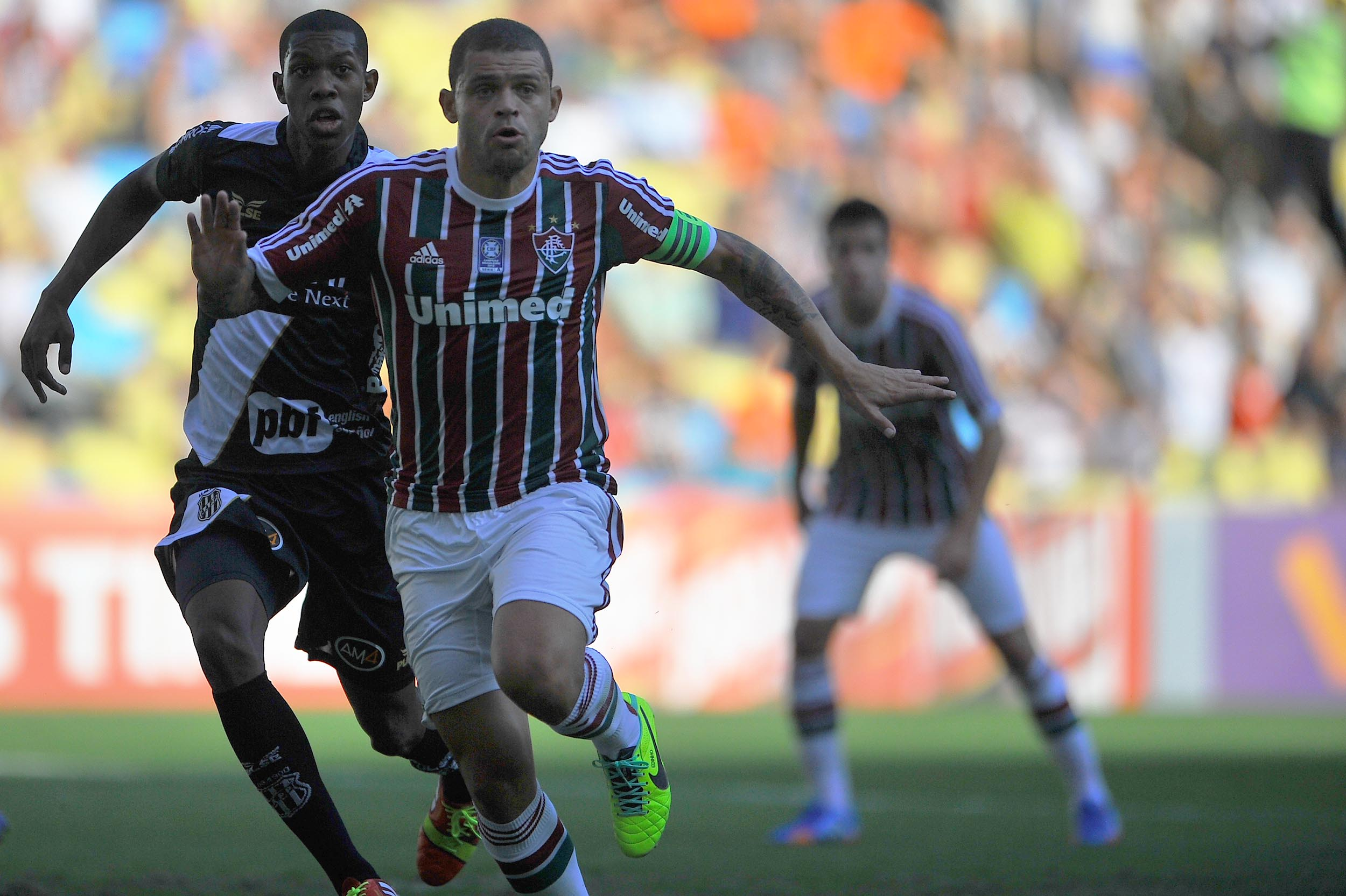
Edinho.

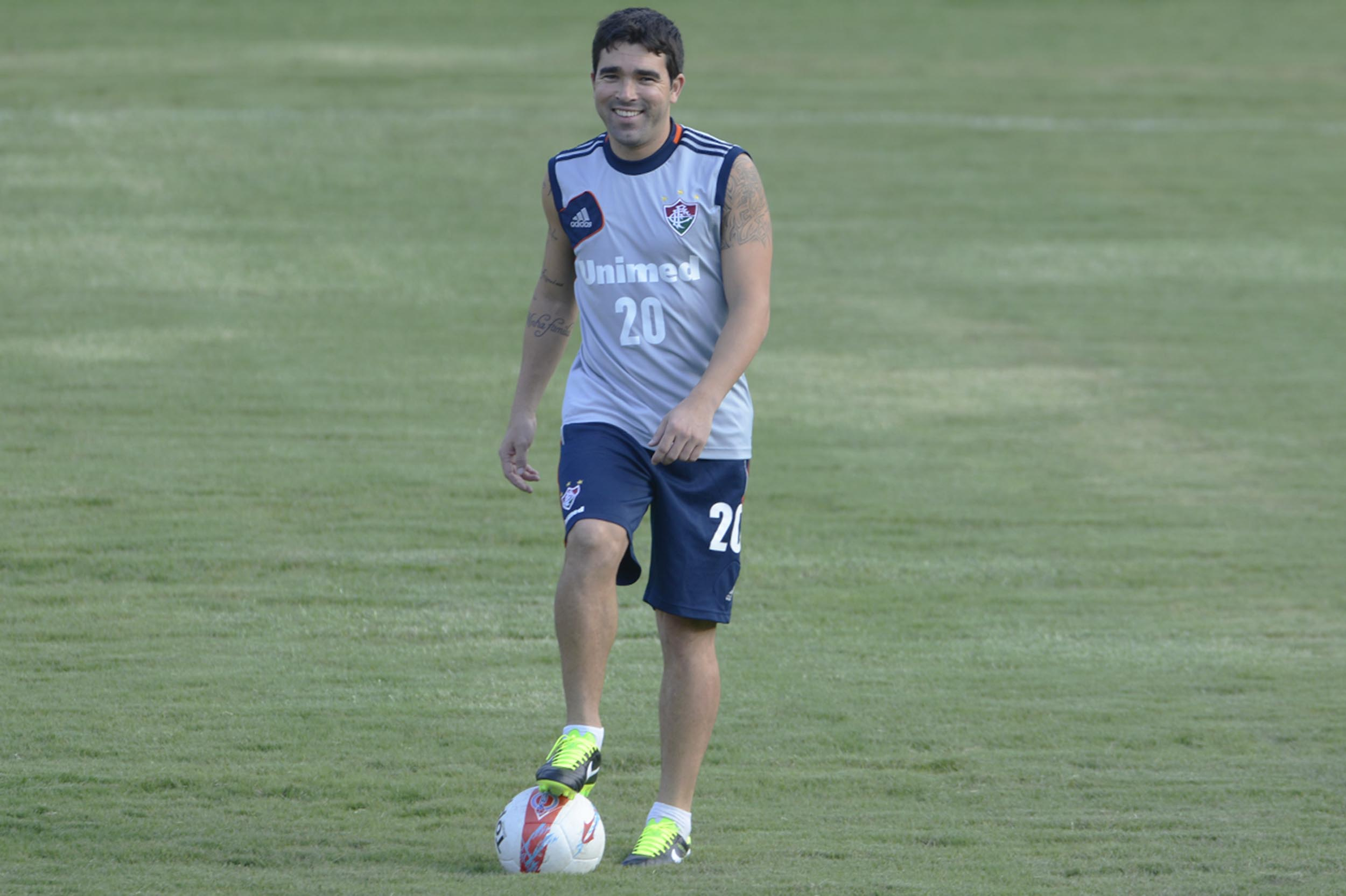
Deco.

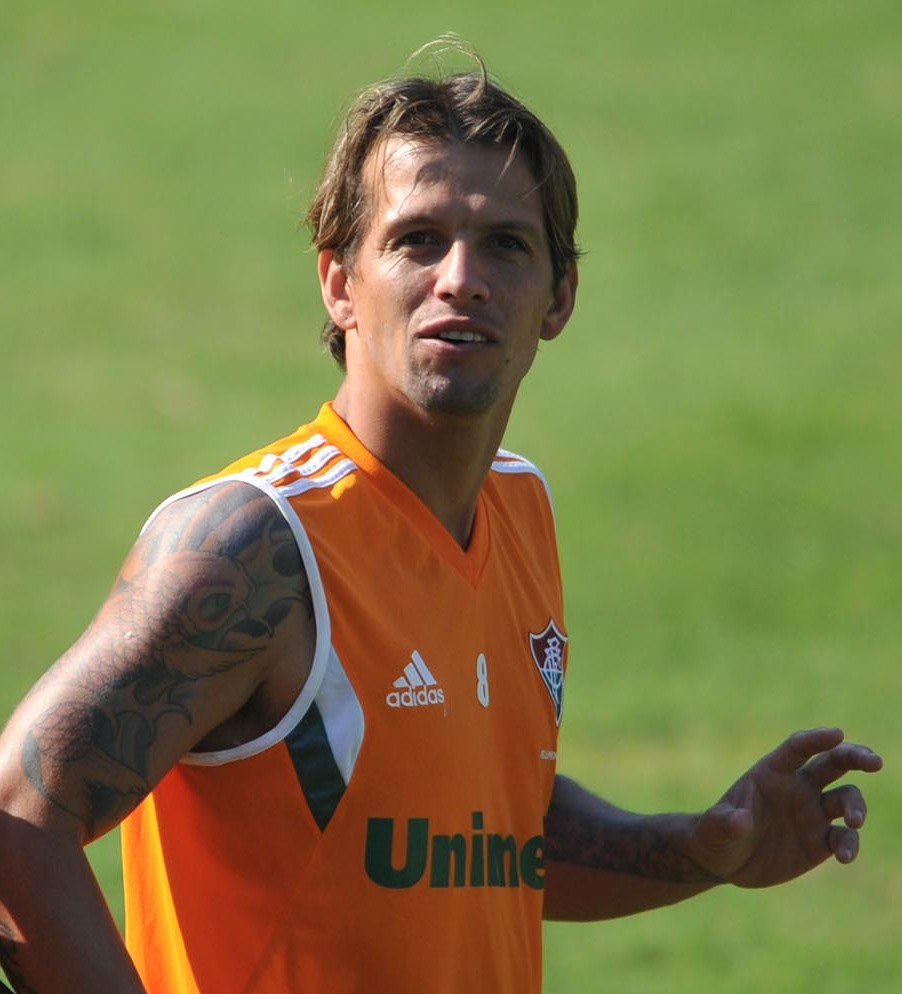
Diguinho.

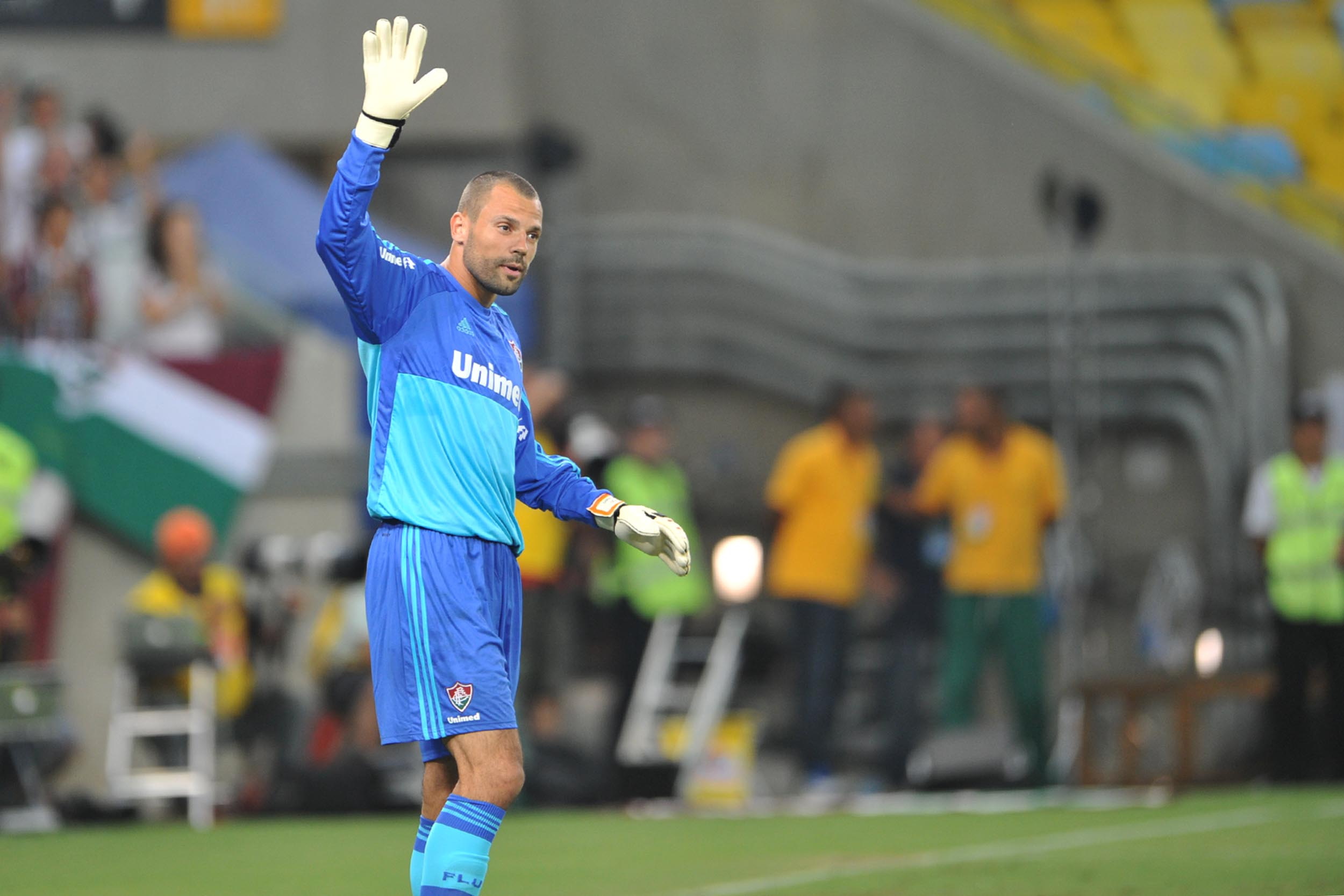
Diego Cavalieri.

The team's performance in the Campeonato Brasileiro was subpar, with a high probability of relegation, estimated at around 99%; until the 27th round, they were in last place with only 21 points (14 defeats, 9 draws, and only 4 wins). Even so, the team fought until the end, and from then on they did not lose again: a draw against Corinthians (1–1), a victory against Santo André (2–1), draws against Internacional and Goiás (both 2–2), a victory against Atlético-MG (2–1), a historic comeback against Cruzeiro (3–2), bringing 66,884 spectators to the Maracanã in the victory over Palmeiras (1–0) on 8 November, 55,030 the following week in the victory against Atlético-PR (2–1), in the thrashing of Sport (3–0), and 55,083 spectators in the victory against Vitória (4–0) on 29 November, when they managed to get out of the relegation zone after 27 rounds.

In the last round, they only needed a draw to avoid relegation. They tied Coritiba 1–1 at the Estádio Couto Pereira, remaining undefeated in the last 11 matches of the competition. Fluminense avoided relegation, which sparked violent protests in the stadium after the match. Dozens of people were injured due to the relegation of the Paraná club. Thus, Fluminense became known as the "Time de Guerreiros" ("Team of Warriors").

Meanwhile, in the 2009 Copa Sudamericana, Fluminense completed 24 matches of invincibility in CONMEBOL competitions when playing at home (the last defeat had happened against Argentinos Juniors on 5 August 1985, the club that would be champion of that edition of the Libertadores, or 27 matches, if matches in Rio against Vasco, Botafogo, and Flamengo, with the opponents having home advantage, are considered) after eliminating Flamengo, thrashing Alianza Atlético (Peru) 4–1 on 1 October, defeating Universidad de Chile 1–0 on 5 November, and Cerro Porteño 2–1 on 18 November.

In the semifinals, Fluminense faced Cerro Porteño, having won the first leg in Asunción 1–0. As had happened in the victory over Universidad de Chile, when local fans threw objects at the tricolor team, Cerro fans threw stones at Fluminense players, injuring a local police officer. In the return leg at the Maracanã, a new victory, now 2–1, with the desperate Paraguayans starting a fight at the end of the match, which had 41,816 spectators present.

In the final, Fluminense faced LDU, the same opponent from the 2008 Copa Libertadores final, having lost the first leg in Quito 5–1, needing to win by a 4-goal difference in the return leg to take the game to extra time. In the Maracanã match, Fluminense won 3–0 in front of 69,565 spectators present, having also had a goal disallowed, leaving the field highly applauded for their great performance, hence the nickname: "Time de guerreiros". For the second time, the dispute between the two teams culminated in the competition's highest-scoring final: nine goals in two games.

The last match of the year against Coritiba, in the city of Curitiba, was one of the decisive matches to define relegation, and it was a dramatic match. With Botafogo's victory over Palmeiras, a draw ensured Fluminense's stay in the first division of 2010, while Coritiba needed a victory to save themselves. Fluminense started by scoring with a legitimate goal from Fred, however not validated by the refereeing. Marquinho, from a free kick, opened the scoring for Fluminense, with Coritiba managing the equalizer, which decreed the final result of 1–1. Fluminense achieved its objective of remaining in the Serie A despite having only a 1.7% chance of doing so, according to statisticians. With 10 rounds left in the championship, Fluminense had 22 points and was 9 points behind the first team outside the relegation zone.

Fluminense remained undefeated in the last 11 matches of the 2009 Campeonato Brasileiro, with four draws and seven wins, six of which were consecutive. Including the Copa Sudamericana, the team was undefeated in 13 matches, with eight consecutive wins. Of the club's final 12 matches of the season, Fluminense won 10, drew 1, and lost 1.

For the second consecutive time, now in 2009, Fluminense had a player elected by popular vote as the Craque da Galera of the Campeonato Brasileiro, this time the Argentine Conca with more than 9,000,000 votes (about 51% of the total votes).

In the 2010 Campeonato Carioca, Fluminense finished in third place, with eleven wins, 2 draws, and only 2 defeats, 36 goals for and 13 against, while in the Copa do Brasil, after defeating Confiança, Uberaba, and Portuguesa, Fluminense was eliminated in the quarter-finals by Grêmio, losing both matches in which they played without their two main forwards (Fred and Allan, both with appendicitis attacks that led to surgery), in addition to Conca in the first leg and Mariano in the second.

Fluminense ended the pre-2010 FIFA World Cup phase of the Campeonato Brasileiro by defeating Avaí in Florianópolis 3–0, in third place, with fifteen points, 2 behind the top two, with five wins, 2 defeats, 11 goals for and 5 against. Of the 96 points contested that year until that match, the team secured 67, with 21 wins, 4 draws, 7 losses, 62 goals scored and 32 goals conceded. Avaí had not lost at the Estádio da Ressacada for about 9 months (25 matches).

Fluminense won the Troféu Osmar Santos, awarded by the newspaper Lance!, for being the symbolic champion of the first round of the 2010 Brazilian Serie A Championship. They earned this title by achieving 38 points in 19 matches (11 wins, five draws, and three defeats), scoring 32 goals and conceding 16. The team also remained undefeated for 15 rounds during that period.

With a final sequence of nine undefeated matches, Fluminense became national champion for the third time, this being the fourth national title for coach Muricy Ramalho in that decade. The 2010 Brazilian champion title was the first relevant title won by a club at the Engenhão Stadium, with Cruzeiro, who defeated Palmeiras, becoming runners-up, as Corinthians only drew with Goiás.

Fluminense totaled 71 points with 20 wins, 11 draws, and seven defeats. They scored 62 goals and allowed 36, achieving a 62.3% success rate. They led the championship in 23 of the 38 rounds. The Argentine Conca was considered the best player of the championship by the CBF (Prêmio Craque do Brasileirão), the newspaper Lance!, and the magazine Placar. He played all 38 matches, was the team's top scorer with nine goals (Washington scored 10 goals, but two were for São Paulo), and provided 19 assists for tricolor goals. Full-back Mariano and coach Muricy were also highlighted by the press. Emerson was considered the hero of the decisive match.

Having lost their coach Muricy Ramalho on 13 March, Fluminense lived troubled moments but still managed to finish the 2011 Campeonato Carioca as runners-up, with their forward Fred finishing as top scorer of this competition. In the 2011 Copa Libertadores, once again contesting what was considered by the press as the most difficult group of the competition, they managed qualification for the second phase by defeating Argentinos Juniors 4–2 in Buenos Aires, when they had only an 8% mathematical possibility of qualifying for the second phase according to statisticians, with the team being received by about 1,000 celebrating fans upon arrival at Galeão Airport on 22 April.

In the first match of the round of 16 in the most important club competition in the Americas, they beat Club Libertad 3–1 at the Engenhão Stadium in front of 25,378 spectators. However, they were eliminated 3–0 in the second match. Playing cautiously to maintain their lead, they conceded two goals in the last five minutes.

In the 2011 Brazilian Serie A Championship, the team had an uneven start, finishing the first round in 11th place with 25 points in 19 matches. They then had impressive performances in the second round, earning the same number of points in just 11 matches as they had in the entire first round. On November 20, Fluminense defeated Figueirense 4–0 at the Estádio Orlando Scarpelli in a third-to-last round match. With this victory, they secured a spot in the 2012 Copa Libertadores and won the symbolic title of second-round champion of the Campeonato Brasileiro, earning the Troféu João Saldanha. Figueirense was the only club that could tie them in points, but Fluminense had more wins.

At the end of the championship, Fluminense placed third with 63 points, earning 20 wins and three draws while suffering 15 defeats. They scored 60 goals (the most of any team in the championship) and conceded 51. Fred finished the competition as the runner-up top scorer with 22 goals, setting a record for a Fluminense player in a single edition of the Brazilian Championship. Despite the Maracanã Stadium being closed for renovations, Fluminense's attendance record for this competition was 40,232 for the match against América Mineiro on November 12.

In 2012, the team was nearly invincible. First, Fluminense won the 2012 Taça Guanabara after defeating Vasco 3–1 at the Estádio Olímpico João Havelange. Fred scored two goals and Deco scored one in front of 36,374 spectators. Fluminense qualified to play Botafogo in the final of the Campeonato Carioca, but Botafogo won the Taça Rio. Fluminense won the first decisive match 4–1 with two goals from Rafael Sóbis and one each from Fred and Marcos Júnior. They beat Botafogo again in the second decisive match, winning 1–0 with a goal from Rafael Moura and becoming the Carioca champions.

In the first phase of the 2012 Copa Libertadores, the team played home and away matches against Arsenal de Sarandí, Boca Juniors, and Zamora. They became the fourth Brazilian club, and the first from Rio de Janeiro, to defeat Boca Juniors at the La Bombonera. They won 2–1 in front of 47,769 paying spectators, about 4,000 of whom were supporters of Fluminense. They finished the group stage with the best record of all the competitors, just as they did in 2008.

In the round of 16, Fluminense eliminated Internacional with a 0–0 draw in Porto Alegre, thanks to Cavalieri's penalty save, and a 2–1 victory in the second leg. Thiago Neves took a free kick that Fred headed in for the first goal, and Leandro Euzébio scored on a free kick taken by Thiago for the second. Fluminense advanced to face Boca Juniors again in the quarterfinals.

In the first leg, marked by controversial refereeing criticized by both the Brazilian and Argentine press, Boca Juniors defeated Fluminense 1–0 in Buenos Aires. Fluminense drew the second leg 1–1 at the Engenhão, playing without five starters: Deco, Fred, Carlinhos, Wellington Nem, and Valencia. The match saw a goal from Thiago Carleto for Fluminense and seemed headed for a penalty shootout until Santiago Silva scored an equalizer for the Argentine club in the 45th minute of the second half, sealing the final result before 36,276 spectators. The team finished the competition in fifth place, nevertheless receiving strong applause from their fans.

During the 2012 Campeonato Brasileiro, Fluminense had to balance league matches with the latter stages of the Copa Libertadores.

Undefeated up to that point, Fluminense defeated Flamengo 1–0 with a goal from Fred on July 8, in the eighth round. This was the first Fla-Flu played after the derby's first centenary, a milestone that was widely celebrated and covered by the press in the week leading up to the match. The team remained undefeated for 11 games until a 1–0 loss to Grêmio. Despite the loss, Fluminense remained in the running to overtake the leader, which at the time was Atlético-MG.

At the end of the first half of the season, Fluminense was in second place with 42 points, a club record for points in a single half of the Brazilian Championship. In a 4–0 rout over Bahia, striker Fred scored two penalty goals and became Fluminense's all-time top scorer in Brazilian championships, maintaining an average of 0.70 goals per game in that tournament.

In the twenty-second round of the competition, Fluminense reached first place by defeating Santos 3–1 at the Engenhão. They held onto that position and, with three rounds to spare after beating Palmeiras 3–2 in Presidente Prudente (with two goals from Fred) and benefiting from Atlético-MG's stumble against Vasco da Gama (1–1), the team secured their fourth Brazilian Championship title, which led to major celebrations when they arrived at Laranjeiras.

This Brazilian championship campaign entered the club's history books. Since the competition adopted a 20-club, round-robin format, Fluminense's campaign was one of the most notable, even after fielding weakened teams in the final three matches, with the last game featuring reserve players except for right-back Bruno. This prevented them from surpassing São Paulo's points record from 2006.

At the end of the championship, further highlights included having the best defense (33 goals conceded), the second-best attack (61 goals scored), the fewest defeats (only 5), the most victories (22), and the league's top scorer, Fred, with twenty goals. Fred also received the CBF award for the best player of the season.

In the victory of the Superclásico de las Américas trophy on November 21, 2012, Fluminense was represented on the field by five players: goalkeeper Diego Cavalieri, full-back Carlinhos, midfielders Jean and Thiago Neves (who both took part in the penalty shootout), and striker Fred, who scored the goal for the Brazilian National Team in the match. Meanwhile, Edwin Valencia played for the Colombian National Team in the 2014 World Cup qualifiers.

=== 2013: Player departures and legal issues involving other clubs ===
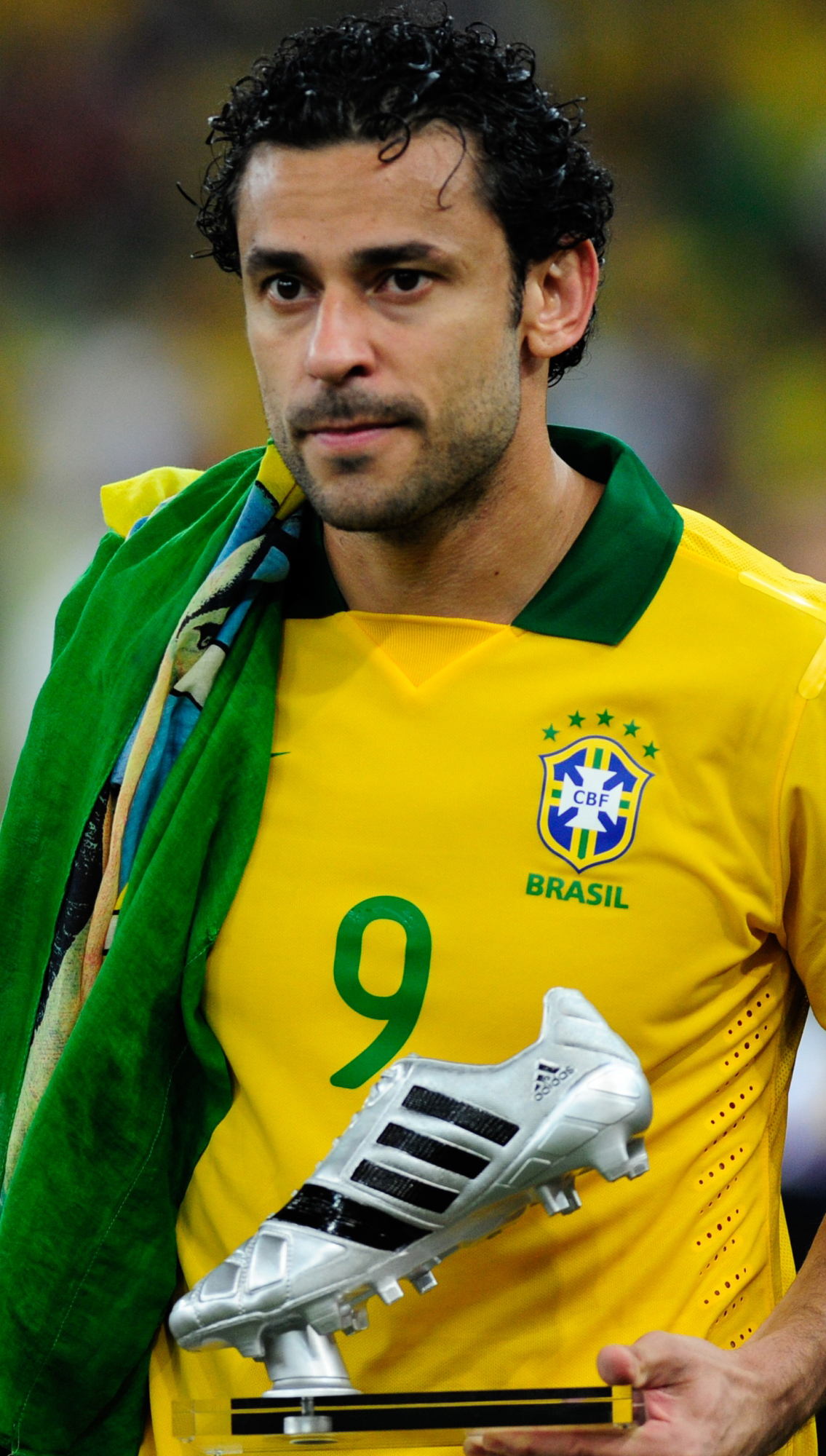
Fred, Fluminense's striker from 2009 onwards.

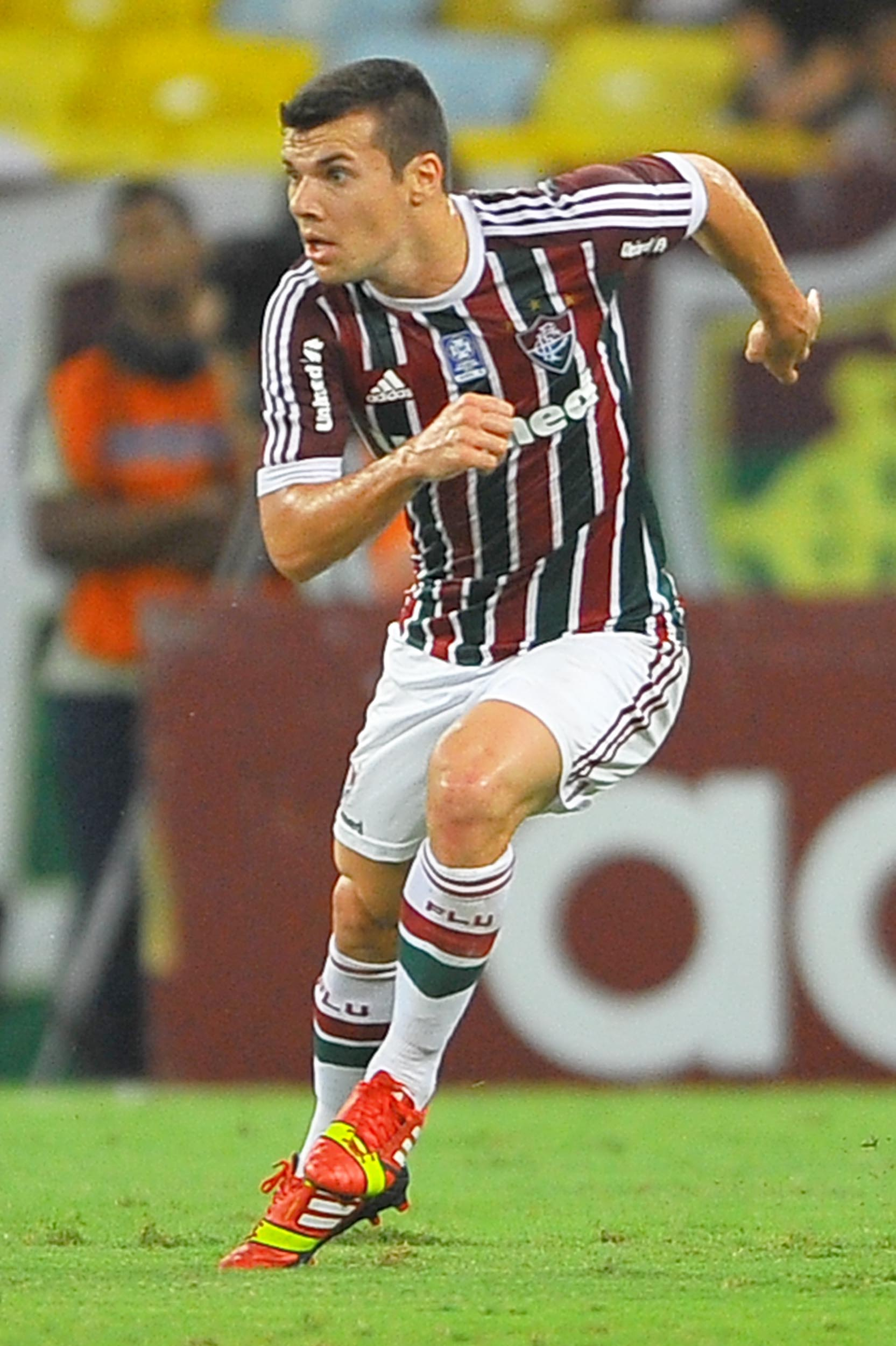
Wagner in 2013.

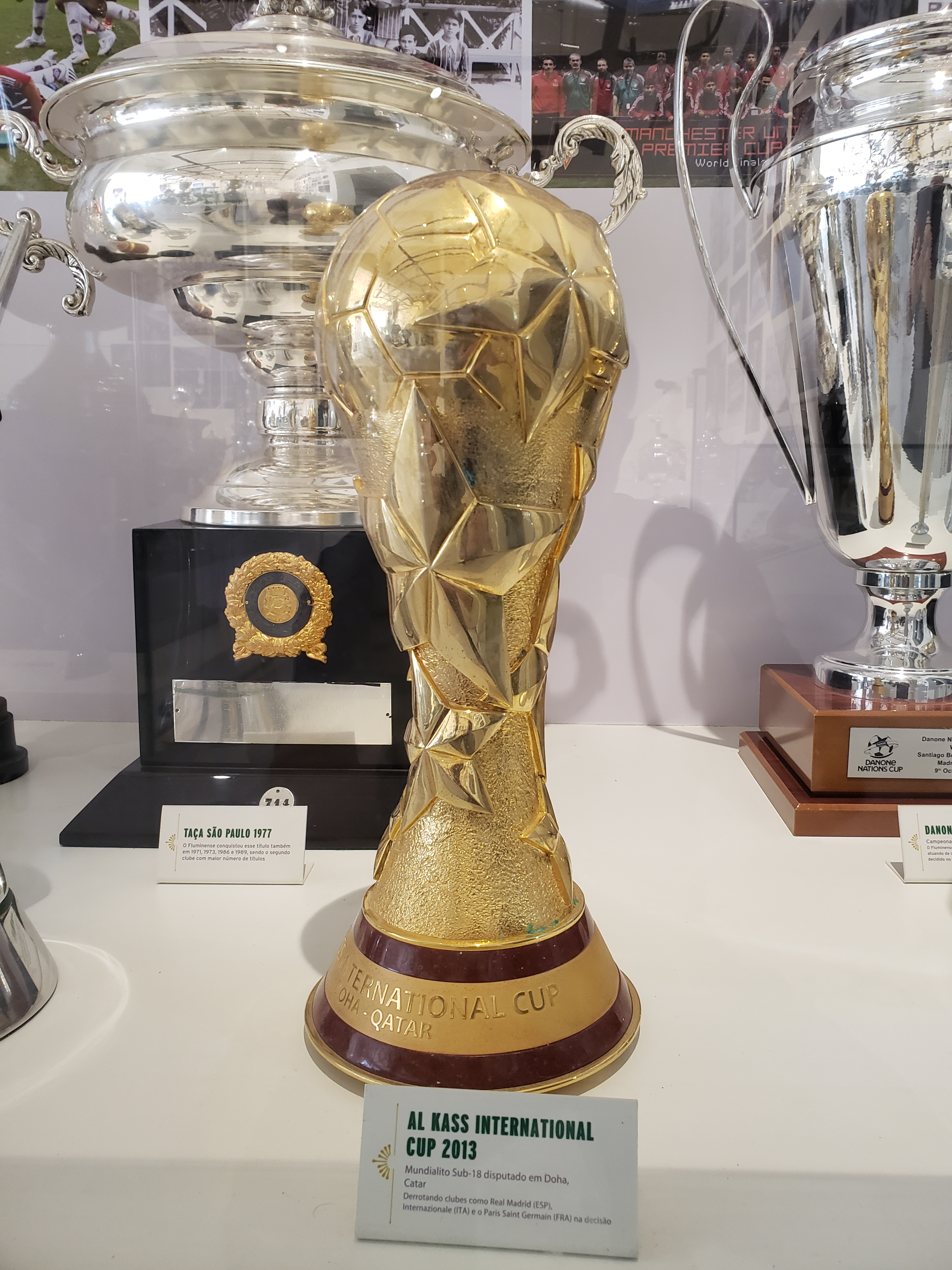
2013 Alkass International Cup.

In the 2013 Campeonato Carioca, the club chose to field reserve or mixed teams in almost all matches to prioritize the continental competition, ultimately finishing the state championship in third place.

Qualifying for the 2013 Copa Libertadores for the fourth time in six years (having impressively contested the 2009 Copa Sudamericana), Fluminense finished the group stage as the winner of their group, which also included Grêmio, Club Deportivo Huachipato (Chile), and Caracas Fútbol Club (Venezuela). This qualified them for the round of 16 against Club Sport Emelec (Ecuador), where they lost the first leg away 2–1, a match featuring a highly contested penalty that gave the opposition the win. Fluminense won the return leg 2–0.

In the quarter-finals, Fluminense faced Club Olimpia (Paraguay), drawing the first leg 0–0 in Rio de Janeiro and losing the return leg 2–1 in a match marked by the Paraguayan team's time-wasting tactics.

Fluminense was in fourth place in the Brazilian Championship after five rounds, before the league's interruption for the 2013 FIFA Confederations Cup, despite having fielded mixed teams up to that point. The break was used for a tour of the United States, during which, in addition to three training matches, they won a game against Orlando City SC 4–3 on June 22. At the Confederations Cup, striker Fred scored five goals, two of them in the final against the Spanish National Team, becoming one of the standout players in Brazil's triumph, a squad that also included Fluminense players Diego Cavalieri and Jean.

On July 10, 2013, Fluminense signed a 35-year stadium usage contract for the Maracanã with the consortium managing the stadium, becoming the first club to sign a long-term agreement for the use of the Maracanã after its major renovation for the 2013 FIFA Confederations Cup and the 2014 FIFA World Cup, and following its concession to the private sector.

Having lost players due to injuries and departures, and after changing managers with the exit of Abel Braga and the arrival of Wanderley Luxemburgo, Fluminense's performance declined after the Confederations Cup. They finished the first half of the 2013 Campeonato Brasileiro in 14th place with 22 points.

The team's performance dropped even further in the second half of the season. They played most rounds with different starting lineups and were already without Deco, Thiago Neves, and Wellington Nem, while Carlinhos, Valencia, and Fred were unavailable due to injuries. The team performed very poorly. A few weeks before the end of the competition, the threat of relegation prompted the club's board to seek salvation once again in the courts, investigating possible irregularities by rivals that could alter the standings off the pitch and eliminate the strong risk of relegation. This endeavor proved fruitless, but the 38th round brought new developments that proved indispensable for their top-flight survival, raising suspicions about the involvement of club officials, fans, referees, and Fluminense sponsors in the scandal that would become known as the "Héverton Case".

A 2–1 victory over Bahia in Salvador on the final matchday was not enough to prevent the Tricolor from finishing the championship inside the relegation zone, in 17th position. However, Portuguesa and Flamengo had fielded ineligible players in their final matches, leading to each being deducted 4 points and lifting Fluminense to 15th place. This outcome had been predicted by sports law experts, with Portuguesa and Flamengo being unanimously defeated at the STJD (Superior Tribunal de Justiça Desportiva), by 5–0 and by 8–0 in the appeal judgment.

==== Fluminense's historical stance on regulatory compliance ====
===== 1924 Rio de Janeiro Men's Volleyball Championship =====
In 1924, Fluminense had been defeated in the decisive match of the Rio de Janeiro Men's Volleyball Championship by São Cristóvão. However, the AMEA (Metropolitan Athletic Sports Association) attempted to schedule a new match alleging an irregularity committed by the opposing club. Fluminense came to the defense of their opponent via an official letter sent to the AMEA, arguing that the regulations had been faithfully followed. This position was accepted, and the original result was upheld.

===== Annulment of the 1927 Torneio Initium =====
In 1927, having won the Torneio Início on the field, Fluminense requested its annulment on the grounds that they had infringed the regulations by including two substitutes in their squad, as stated in an official letter sent to the AMEA. Days after the tournament, Fluminense realized they had inadvertently breached the tournament rules. Voluntarily, and to the great surprise of the other clubs who were unaware of the fact, they sent a letter to the AMEA. The governing body, in light of the team's declaration, annulled the Torneio Initium.

The text of the letter read:

To His Excellency the President of the Metropolitan Athletic Sports Association.

I hasten to inform Your Excellency that, on the occasion of the second match played by Fluminense Football Club in the recent Torneio Initium, two substitutes were included in our squad by oversight, which contravenes the letter of article 11 of the special regulations of the said tournament.

By bringing this irregularity to Your Excellency's attention, I must emphasize that I do so with the intention of facilitating the verification of the respective match reports.

I reiterate to Your Excellency the assurances of my highest esteem and distinguished consideration.

(signed) Benjamin de Oliveira Filho, secretary.

=== 2014–2019: Pioneering titles in youth categories and the Primeira Liga, and the inauguration of the training ground ===
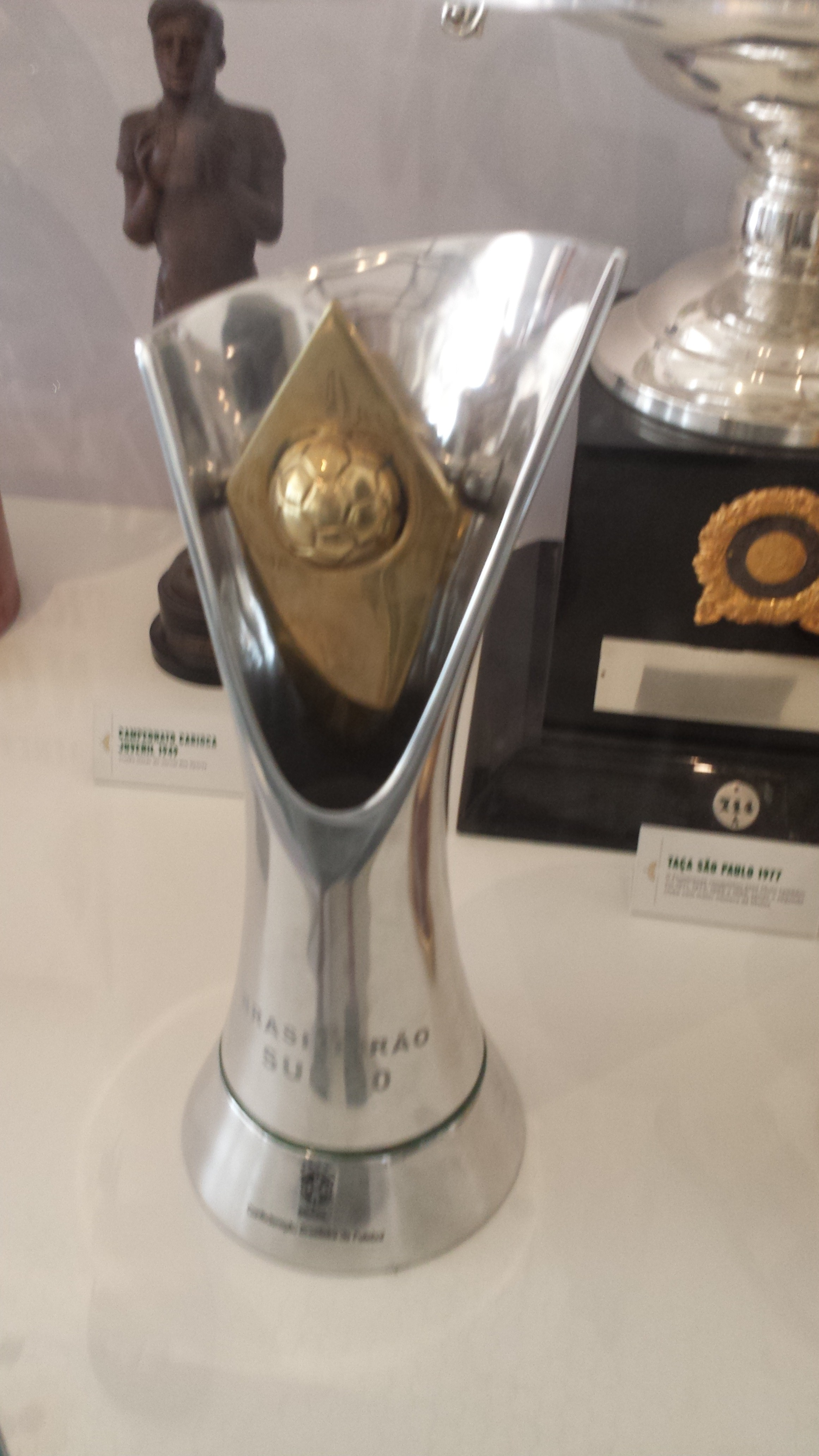
Trophy of the 2015 Brazilian Under-20 Football Championship.

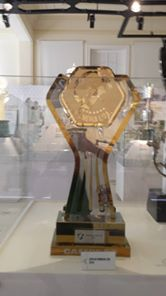
Trophy of the 2016 Primeira Liga.

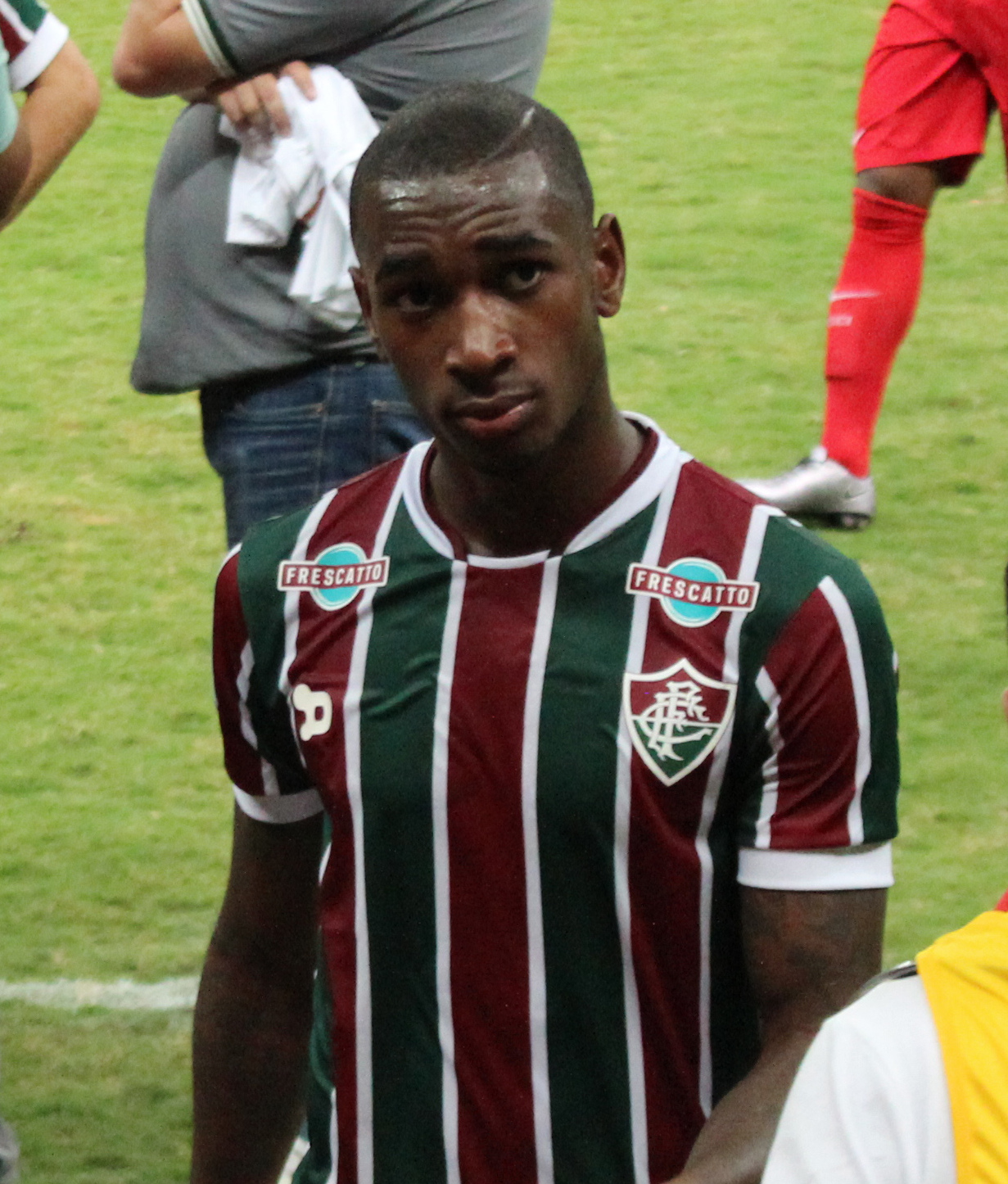
Gerson, a standout player in the Primeira Liga.

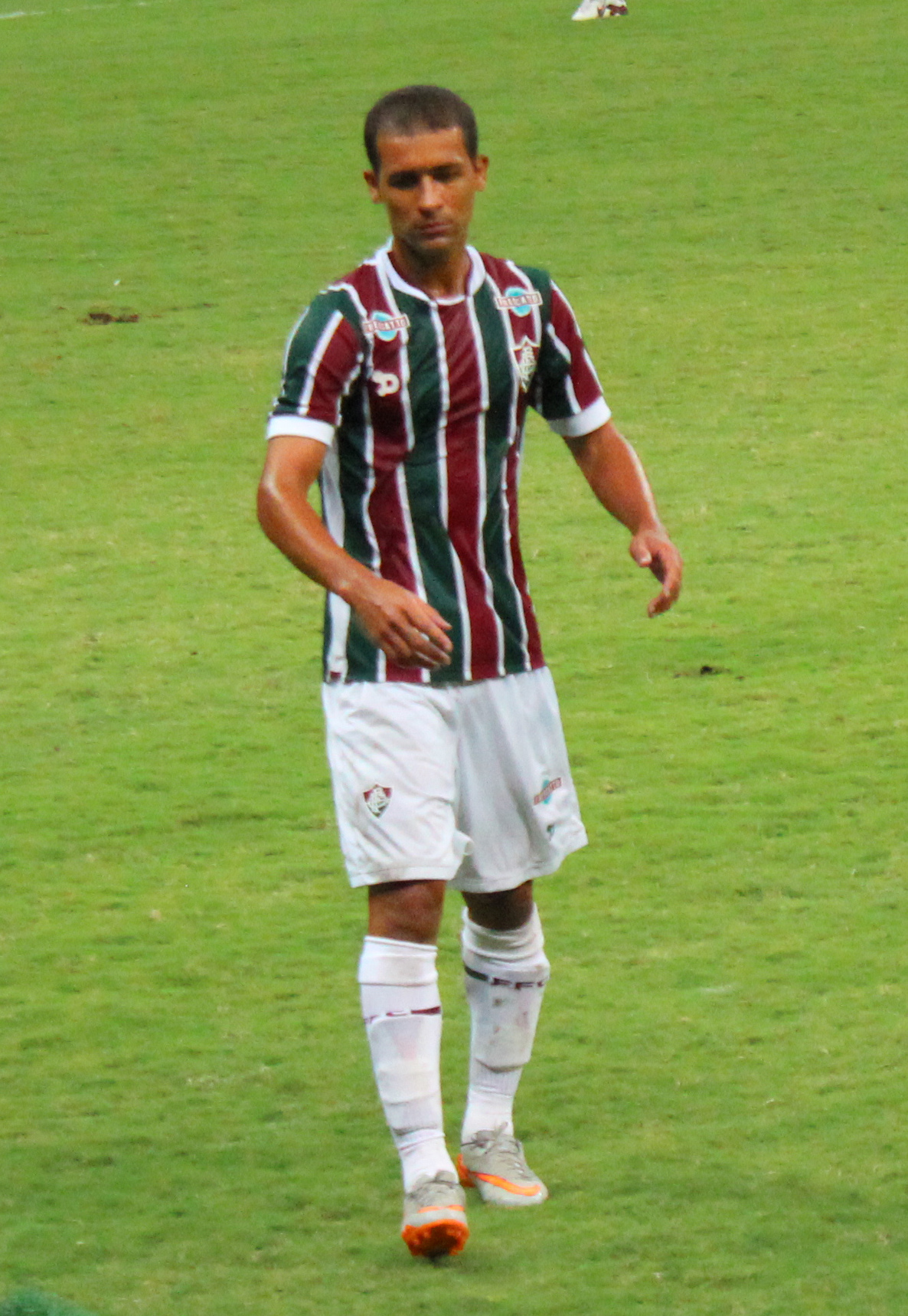
Pierre, in action during the Primeira Liga.

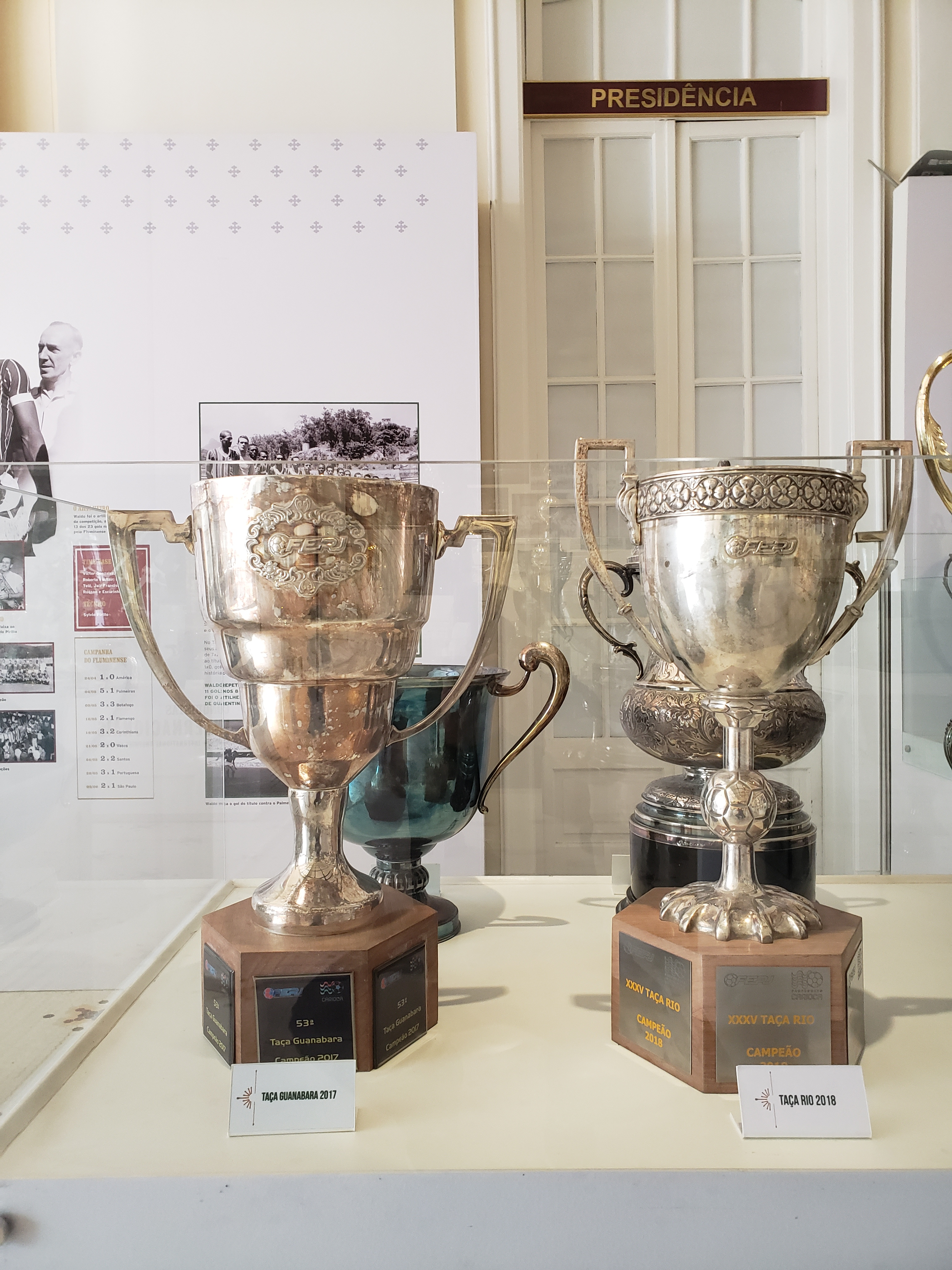
2017 Taça Guanabara and 2018 Taça Rio trophies.

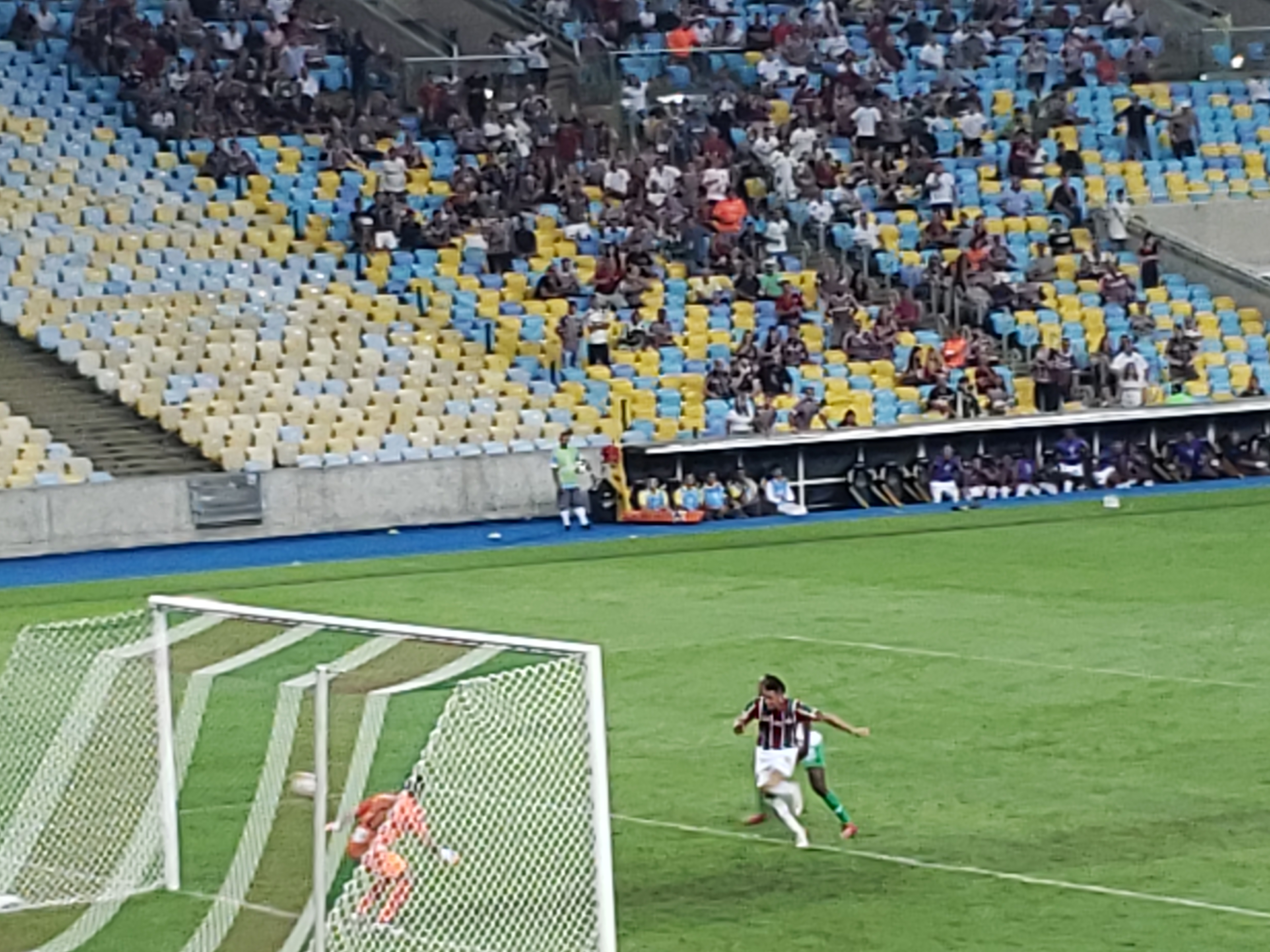
Fluminense defeated Atlético Nacional 4–1 in the 2019 Copa Sudamericana.

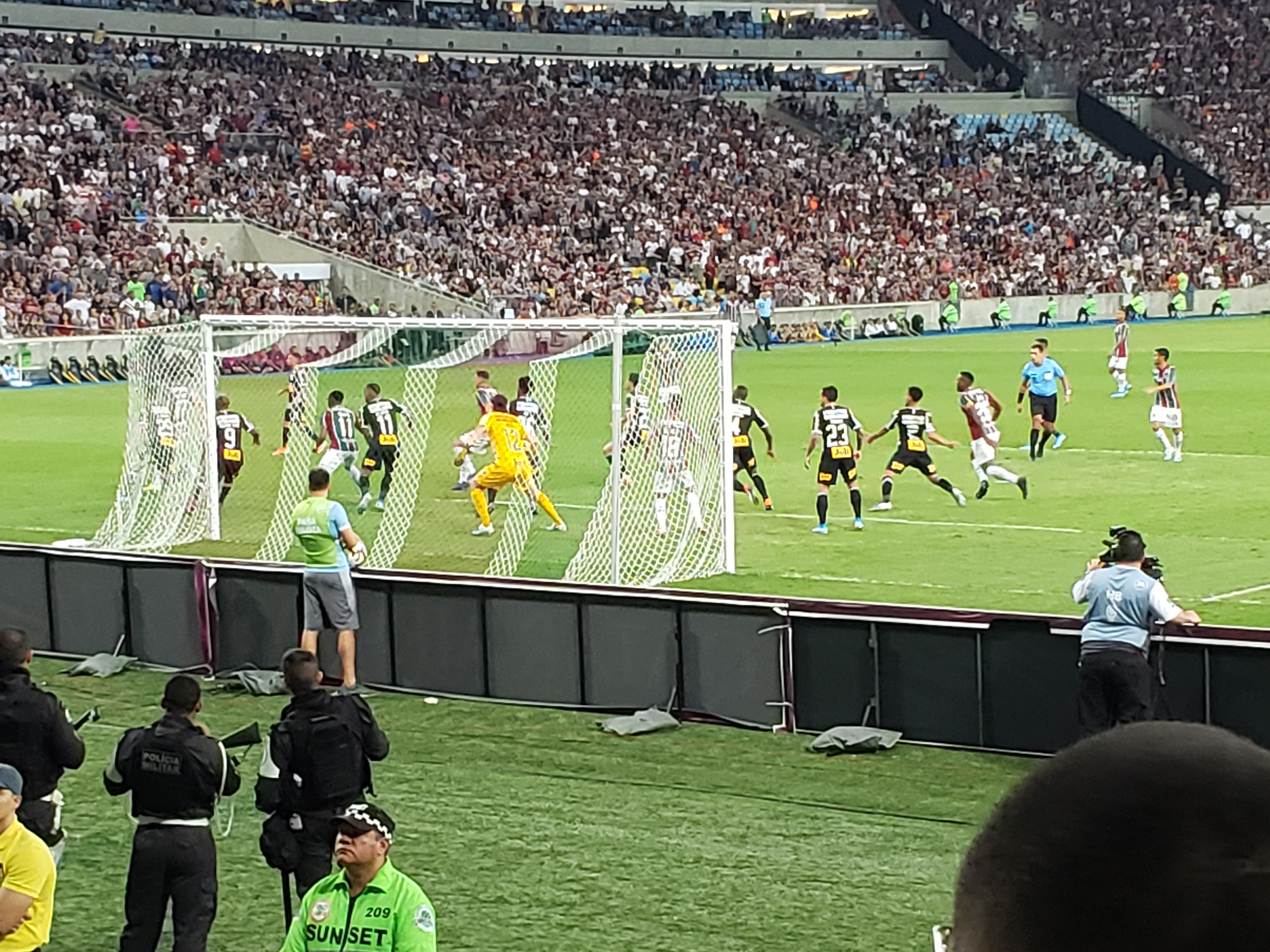
57,773 spectators at the 2019 Copa Sudamericana match against Corinthians.

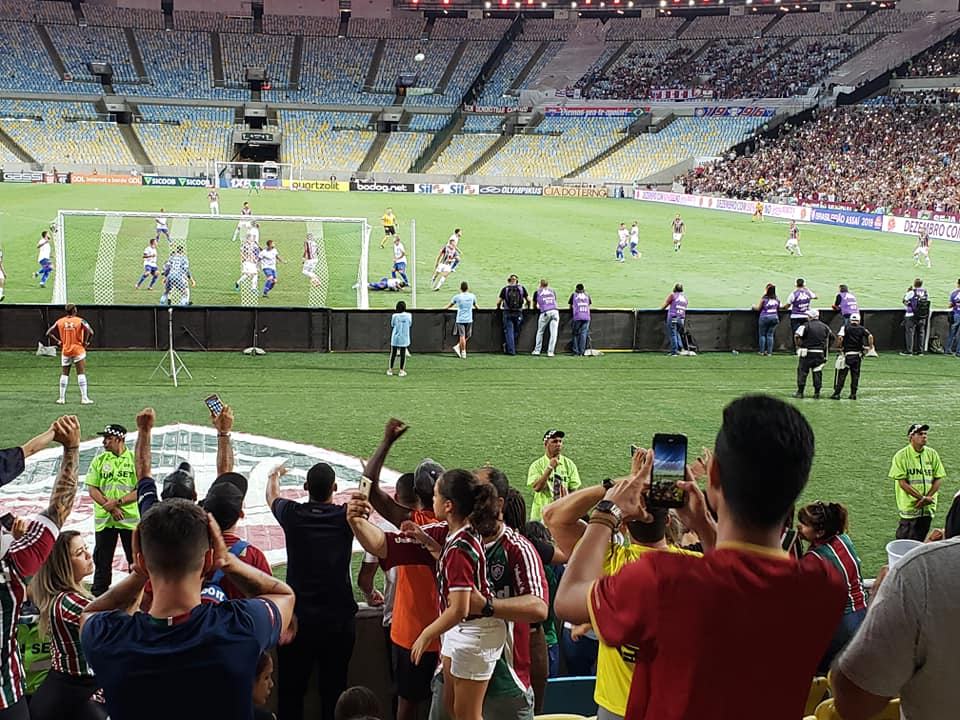
39,965 spectators at the 2019 Campeonato Brasileiro match against Fortaleza.

With the return of Conca to Fluminense and the recovery of several players injured at the end of the previous year, Fluminense finished the Campeonato Brasileiro in sixth place. The Tricolor regained its successful "backbone" from before (Cavalieri - Gum - Conca - Fred), all players under contract for 2015, although Conca was sold to a Chinese club in January 2015.

On December 7, 2014, Fred scored his 18th goal in the 2014 Campeonato Brasileiro, becoming the competition's top scorer. He also won Placar's Chuteira de Ouro award as the top scorer of the year 2014. A survey by Pluri Consultoria revealed that Fred was the fourth favorite player of any nationality among Brazilians, behind Neymar, David Luiz, and Messi, and ahead of the also popular Cristiano Ronaldo.

On July 11, 2015, Fluminense signed Ronaldinho Gaúcho, who came to fill Conca's role in the team's setup, which still included Cavalieri, Gum, and Fred, holdovers from the previous successful period. At the end of the 13th round the following day, Fluminense occupied second place in the Campeonato Brasileiro with 27 points. At the end of the first half, Fluminense was in fourth place with 33 points, 7 behind leader Corinthians. Without the player recovering his best form, Fluminense and Ronaldinho mutually terminated his contract on September 28, with the club having fallen to 12th place by the end of the agreement between the parties.

Fluminense became the first champion of the Brazilian Under-20 Football Championship organized by the CBF, defeating Vitória-BA 3–0 at the Barradão Stadium on September 2, 2015. In 12 matches, Fluminense recorded 10 wins and 2 draws, scoring 24 goals and conceding 8. Matheus Pato was the top scorer with six goals, and Douglas was named the best player.

In the 2015 Copa do Brasil, Fluminense entered in the round of 16 due to their 6th-place finish in the 2014 Campeonato Brasileiro. They advanced past Paysandu (2–1 and 2–1) and Grêmio (0–0 and 1–1), reaching the semi-finals of the competition against Palmeiras. They won the first leg at the Maracanã 2–1 and lost the second leg at the Allianz Parque by the same score, losing the qualification in a penalty shootout. The tie featured controversial penalties awarded to Palmeiras in both matches, and Fluminense finished the competition in third place.

Fluminense won the inaugural edition of the Primeira Liga in 2016 by defeating Atlético Paranaense 1–0 in the final, with a goal from Marcos Júnior. The first edition of this competition featured three clubs from Minas Gerais (América, Atlético-MG, and Cruzeiro), three from Santa Catarina (Avaí, Criciúma, and Figueirense), two from Rio Grande do Sul (Grêmio and Internacional), two from Paraná (Atlético-PR and Coritiba), and two from Rio de Janeiro (Flamengo and Fluminense). Ten of these were participants in the 2016 Série A and two had been relegated to the Série B at the end of the previous year. Top scorer Fred and defender Gum were still holdovers from the 2009 team, as was goalkeeper Diego Cavalieri from 2011. Cícero and Magno Alves also had previous successful spells at Fluminense, both having returned to the club in 2015. In 5 matches, Fluminense recorded 3 wins, 1 draw, and 1 loss, scoring 9 goals and conceding 6. Diego Souza was the team's and the competition's top scorer with 3 goals, Gustavo Scarpa was elected the best player of the 2016 Primeira Liga, and Marcos Júnior was the man of the match in the final. The Primeira Liga do Brasil's official status is supported by item I of art. 217 of the Federal Constitution and the terms of federal sports legislation, enjoying peculiar autonomy regarding its organization and functioning, and is not subject to state and federative interference, pursuant to items XVII and XVIII of art. 5º of the Federal Constitution.

On July 21, 2016, Fluminense inaugurated the Pedro Antônio Training Center, in Barra da Tijuca, a neighborhood in the West Zone of Rio de Janeiro. The Danish Olympic Men's Football Team was the first football team to train at the Tricolor's training ground, on August 5, during the 2016 Summer Olympics, hosted in Rio de Janeiro. On October 11, 2016, Fluminense's first team began training at the location.

In 2017, they would win the Taça Guanabara by defeating Flamengo in a penalty shootout after a 3–3 draw in normal time, but lost the Campeonato Carioca title to the same rival in the final, amid controversial refereeing. They finished in fifth place in the 2017 Copa Sudamericana, being eliminated by the same rival in the quarter-finals.

In 2018, the Tricolor won the Taça Rio by defeating Botafogo 3–0 in the final and again reached the knockout stages of the 2018 Copa Sudamericana, falling in the semi-final to Atlético Paranaense. That same year, the club experienced the longest goal drought in its history, going 803 minutes without scoring. This was largely contributed to by the absence of their striker Pedro, who in the Campeonato Brasileiro was the competition's top scorer with 10 goals in 19 games until suffering an injury that required surgery in September, sidelining him for the rest of the year. He was ultimately elected the best newcomer of the championship by team captains, coaches, and journalists, from a pool of 10,000 voters. Until August 25, besides being the league's top scorer, he was the player with the most shots and second in direct goal contributions. During the 2018 Campeonato Brasileiro, Fluminense did not have a single penalty awarded in their favor, while seven penalties were awarded against the Tricolor.

The Pedro Antônio Training Center was the only training ground in Rio de Janeiro chosen by CONMEBOL to be used by national teams participating in the 2019 Copa América, being utilized by invitees Qatar and the South American teams of Peru, Uruguay, and Argentina during the competition.

Competing for the sixth consecutive time at the 2019 Pan American Games, Fluminense diver Juliana Veloso became the Brazilian athlete with the most Pan American Games appearances. She had won a silver and a bronze medal in Santo Domingo in 2003, bronze at the 2007 Pan American Games in Rio de Janeiro, and was already the athlete with the most Olympic appearances, five in total, having been South American champion on several occasions, considering only her most important titles.

Fluminense became champions of the Brazilian stage of the 2019 CONMEBOL U-13 Development Tournament, a competition under the organization and responsibility of the CBF held in Criciúma (SC), with all participants qualified by technical criteria. They defeated Corinthians 3–0, qualifying to represent Brazil in the South American competition, scheduled for January 2020 in Asunción, Paraguay. In 5 matches played, Fluminense won all, scoring 14 goals and conceding none.

=== 2019–2023: From fighting relegation to winning the Libertadores ===
In the 2019 Copa do Brasil, Fluminense was eliminated without suffering a single loss, knocked out by Cruzeiro on penalties in a match with controversial refereeing. Luciano was the co-top scorer of the competition with five goals. They also had a convincing campaign in the 2019 Copa Sudamericana, reaching the quarter-finals and being eliminated after two draws against Corinthians (0–0 and 1–1) due to the away goals rule.

Despite its successes in national and international tournaments, Fluminense experienced an unstable year internally, as the club was going through a financial crisis and had a presidential election, where Mário Bittencourt emerged victorious by defeating Ricardo Tenório, thus ending the Flusócio political era. In the 2019 Campeonato Brasileiro, the team fought against relegation and, on the final matchday, qualified for the 2020 Copa Sudamericana.

On February 2, 2020, Fluminense became South American champions by winning the CONMEBOL U-13 Development Tournament, held in Asunción, Paraguay, after facing the Argentine club Rosario Central in the final. In an undefeated campaign with 4 wins and 2 draws, 27 goals for and 5 against in 6 matches, Fluminense played against Olimpia (Paraguay), Los Conquistadores (Chile), the Bogotá Team (Colombia), Barcelona (Ecuador), and Rosario Central (Argentina), drawing twice against the latter, 2–2 and 1–1 in the final, becoming champions in the penalty shootout 4–2. Striker Kauã Elias was the Tricolor's top scorer in the tournament with nine goals.

In the 2020 Campeonato Carioca, Fluminense won the Taça Rio, finishing as runners-up in the competition. In the 2020 Copa do Brasil, the team was eliminated in the fourth round by Atlético Goianiense, and in the 2020 Copa Sudamericana in the first round, after two draws, 1–1 and 0–0 with Chilean club Unión La Calera, having complained about a penalty not awarded for a foul on Nenê in the 28th minute of the second half in the second leg.

On December 21, 2020, they won the Brazilian Under-17 Championship in the second edition of the competition organized by the CBF, by defeating Athletico Paranaense 2–1 at the Arena da Baixada, repeating the result from the first leg at the Estádio Luso Brasileiro. Tricolor player Kayky, with twelve goals, was the competition's top scorer and was pointed out in a poll by the "Football Talent Scout" profile as the best U-17 football player in the world in 2020, with 39.9% of the votes against 23.6% for second-placed Jude Bellingham of Borussia Dortmund, 22.4% for Youssoufa Moukoko of the same German club in third, and in fourth Ronaldo Camará of Benfica with 14%.

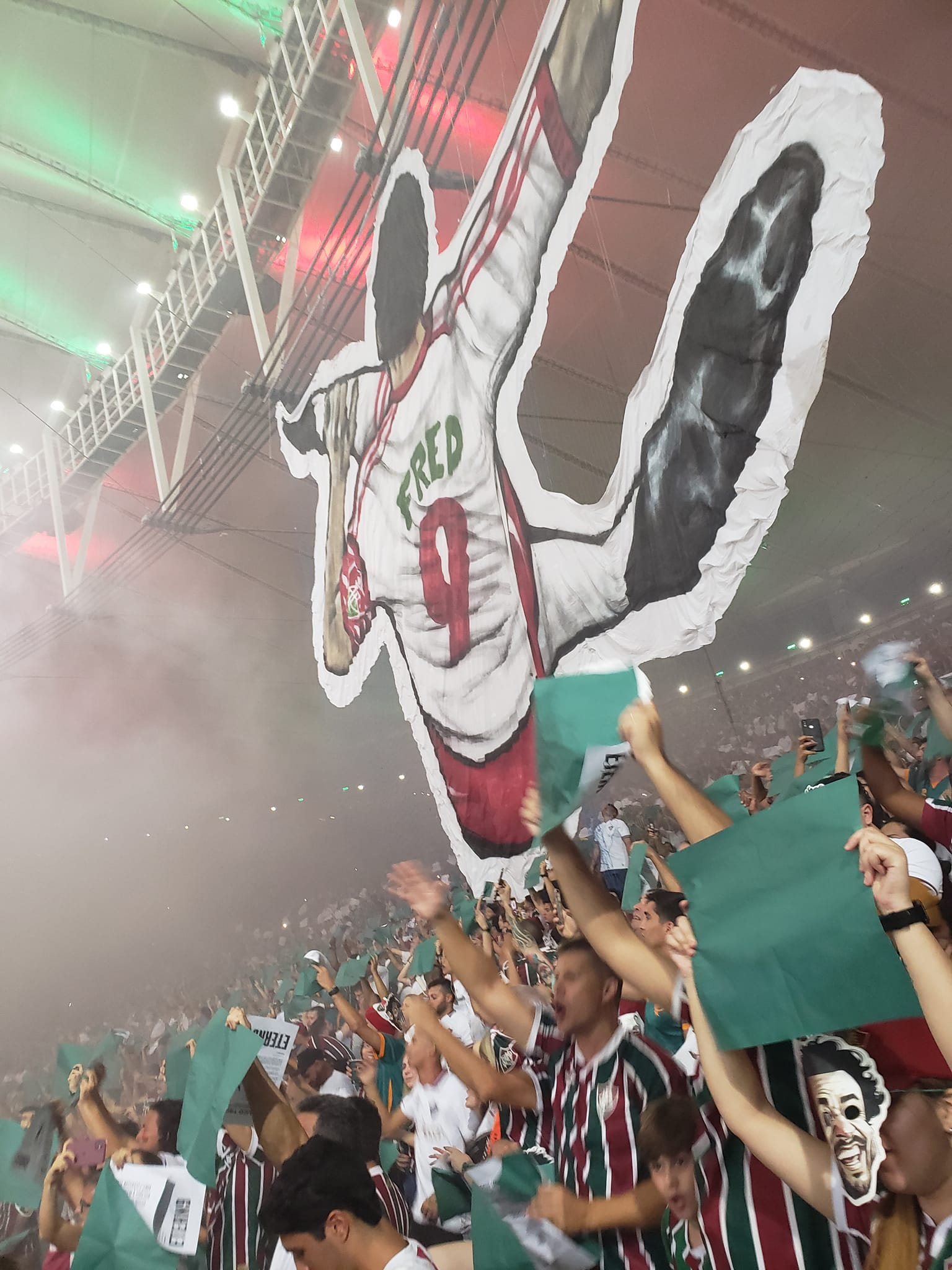
63,707 spectators at the 2022 Campeonato Brasileiro match against Ceará, in Fred's farewell match as a player.

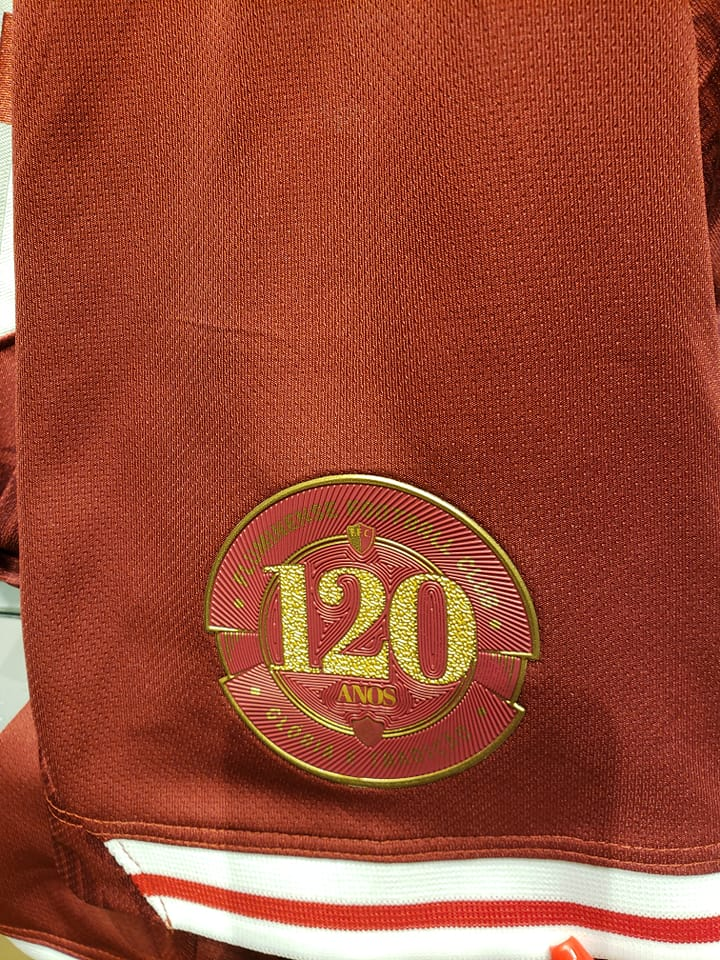
120-year anniversary seal on the third kit in 2022.

The 2020 Campeonato Brasileiro ended on February 25, 2021, and by finishing fifth, Fluminense qualified for the 2021 Copa Libertadores, after eight years without participating in the main continental competition. In 38 matches in the Brasileirão, Fluminense recorded 18 wins, 10 draws, and 10 losses, 55 goals for and 42 against. They had the best performance among the competing clubs in the 11 matches played in 2021, with 7 wins, 3 draws, and 1 loss, 18 goals for and 11 against. With 62 points, it was their best campaign in the Brasileiro since 2012. Another notable aspect of this edition was the return of their idol Fred to the Tricolor squad.

In the 2020 Copa do Brasil, which ended on March 7, 2021, Fluminense was eliminated in the fourth round, but their player Nenê was the co-top scorer of the competition with six goals, becoming, at 39 years old, the oldest player to achieve this feat at the time.

On March 20, 2021, they won the first title in the history of their women's football section, by winning the 2020 Brazilian Women's Under-18 Football Championship at the Estádio Beira-Rio, in the second edition of the championship in that category. This was the first time a team from Rio de Janeiro won this competition.

Fluminense qualified for the 2022 Copa Libertadores by finishing seventh in the 2021 Campeonato Brasileiro. The Tricolor competed in the Copa Libertadores qualifying stages and even overcame Millonarios in the second stage, but ultimately lost the chance to reach the group stage after being eliminated by Olimpia in a penalty shootout 4–1. With this result, the club was transferred to the 2022 Copa Sudamericana.

By defeating Flamengo 2–0 and drawing 1–1 in the final matches, Fluminense became Carioca champions of 2022. In 15 matches, the Tricolor recorded 11 wins, 2 draws, and 2 losses, 21 goals for and 5 against.

On May 26, 2022, Fluminense concluded the group stage of the Copa Sudamericana by inflicting the biggest defeat in the history of the continental competition, thrashing Oriente Petrolero 10–1 in a match played in Bolivia; however, as only the group winner advanced to the round of 16 that year, the Tricolor finished in second place and bid farewell to the continental competition.

In the 2022 Copa do Brasil, Fluminense was eliminated by Corinthians 3–0 in the second leg of the semi-final among 92 participants, finishing the competition in third place.

Fluminense also finished third in the Campeonato Brasileiro, with their striker Germán Cano becoming the top scorer in these three competitions and scoring 44 goals that year, which also saw standout performances from names like Paulo Henrique Ganso, Jhon Arias, André, and Matheus Martins. The Tricolor had a 69.7% win rate in state derbies, the third-best in their history, and qualified for the Copa Libertadores for the third consecutive time.

In the year 2023, Fluminense had an excellent campaign in the Campeonato Carioca, finishing first and winning the Taça Guanabara, and defeating Flamengo again in the final 4–3, overcoming them in the second leg 4–1 after being at a disadvantage from the first leg which they lost 2–0.

Although they were eliminated in the round of 16 of the 2023 Copa do Brasil by the same rival, the story was different in the 2023 Copa Libertadores. In the group stage, they faced River Plate, Sporting Cristal, and The Strongest, advancing in first place with 3 wins, 1 draw, and 2 losses. In the round of 16, they defeated Argentinos Juniors 3–1 on aggregate. In the quarter-finals, they faced Olimpia and, as revenge, overcame them 5–1 over two legs. In the semi-finals, there was a tense clash against the Brazilian club Internacional, ending with a dramatic 4–3 victory on aggregate and a return to the continental final after 15 years.

In the final, played as a single match at the Maracanã, Fluminense faced Boca Juniors. Germán Cano scored for the Tricolor in the 36th minute, while Luis Advíncula equalized for the Xeneizes in the 72nd minute. In the 99th minute of extra time, the ball fell to the feet of John Kennedy, a product of the club's youth academy, who scored the winning goal, despite being sent off a few minutes later. With this, the club won its first continental title and became the 11th Brazilian club to win the Copa Libertadores.

=== 2024-2025: Conquest of the Recopa Sudamericana and participation in the FIFA Club World Cup ===
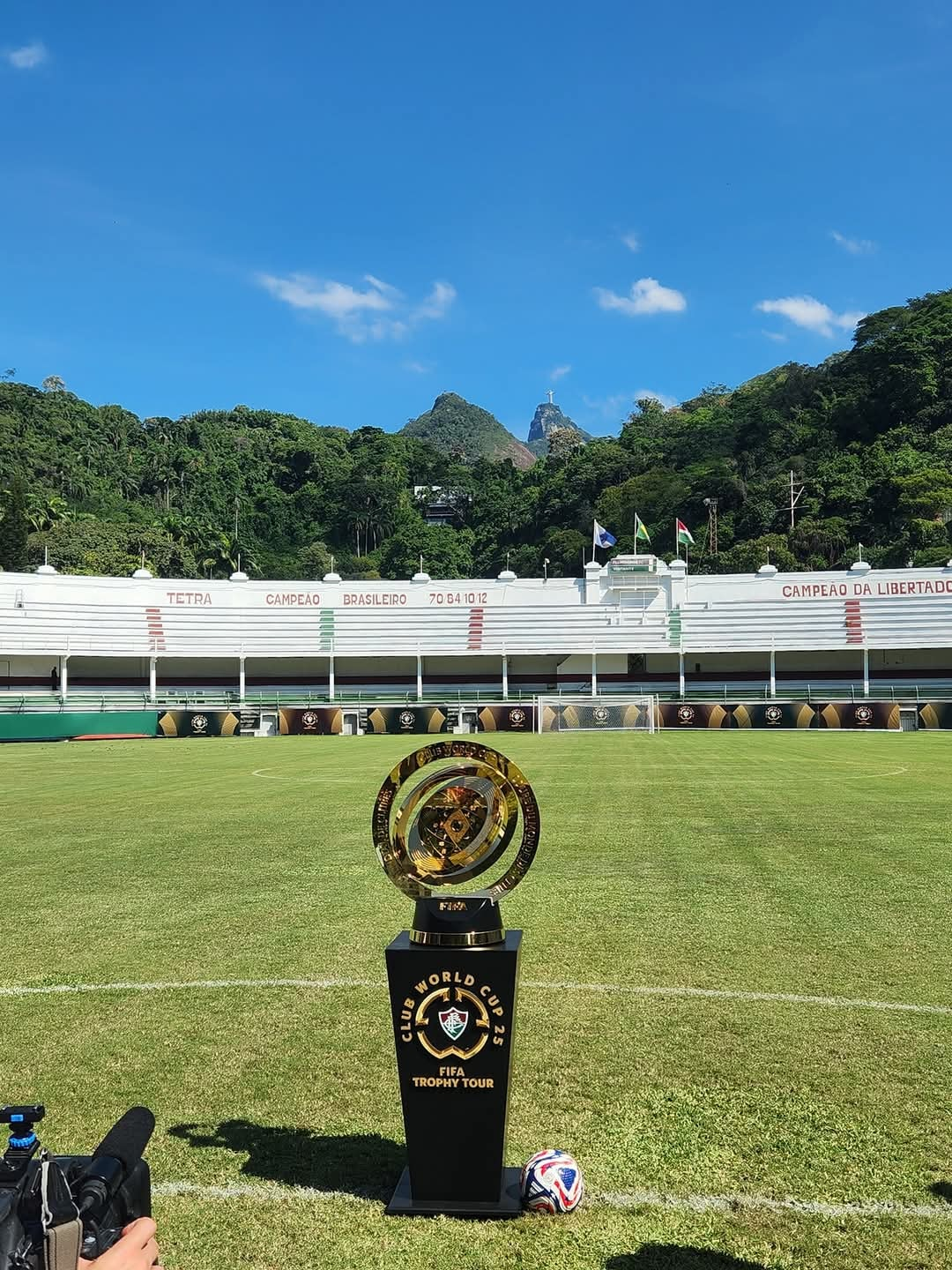
Trophy of the 2025 FIFA Club World Cup at Fluminense.

The following year, before approximately 56,050 fans and with two goals from Jhon Arias, the Tricolor defeated LDU at the Maracanã to conquer the 2024 Recopa Sudamericana, their third international conquest at the stadium.

Fluminense was one of the 32 clubs from around the world qualified for the 2025 FIFA Club World Cup, finishing the competition in fourth place, the best placement for a non-European club in the tournament.
