= History of Botafogo FR =

Brazilian Sports Club

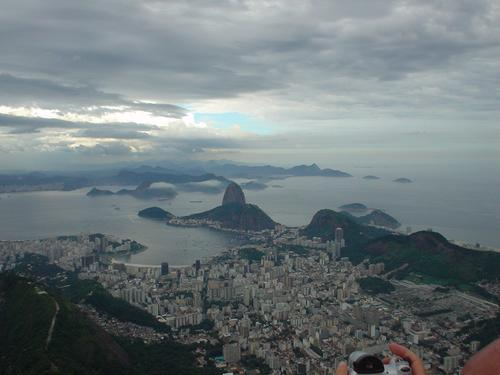
Current aerial view of the Botafogo neighborhood, where the club's headquarters are located

The history of Botafogo de Futebol e Regatas begins in 1891 with the founding of Grupo de Regatas Botafogo in Rio de Janeiro. In 1894, it became Club de Regatas Botafogo. Separately, Botafogo Football Club was established in 1904. In 1942, the two entities merged to form Botafogo de Futebol e Regatas, now one of Brazil's most prominent sports institutions.

Recognized by the five-pointed star on its emblem—earning it the nickname Estrela Solitária ("Lone Star Club")—Botafogo's official colors are black and white. Since 2007, the club has played its football matches at Nilton Santos Stadium, formerly known as Engenhão. Its main rivals are Flamengo, Fluminense, and Vasco da Gama.

FIFA included Botafogo among the greatest clubs of the 20th century. Major titles include the 2024 Copa Libertadores, 21 Carioca Championships, four Rio-São Paulo Tournaments, two Brazilian Championships, and a CONMEBOL Cup (precursor of the current Copa Sudamericana).

Botafogo also holds notable records in Brazilian football: a 52-match unbeaten run (1977–1978), a 42-match unbeaten streak in the Brazilian National team during the same period, the highest number of player appearances in Brazilian national team matches (1,100, including unofficial games), and the most players sent to the World cup. The club also achieved the largest victory in Brazilian football history: 24–0 over Sport Club Mangueira in the 1909 Carioca Championship.

== Foundation ==
=== Predecessors ===
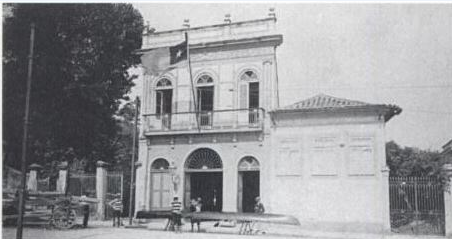
Club de Regata Botafogo's first headquarters

Botafogo de Futebol e Regatas traces its roots to 1891, when members of the Clube Guanabarense (founded in 1874) established the Grupo de Regatas Botafogo, led by rower Luiz Caldas, known as Almirante. Following Caldas' death in 1894, the group was formalized as Club de Regatas Botafogo, with its headquarters located in a mansion near Morro do Pasmado, at the southern end of Botafogo Beach.

On 12 August 1904, in parallel to the regatta club, a new football team, the Electro Club, was created on the initiative of Flávio Ramos and Emmanuel Sodré, two young men between 14 and 15 years old who studied together at Colégio Alfredo Gomes. A little over a month later, the name of the association was changed to Botafogo Football Club, at the suggestion of Flávio's maternal grandmother, known as Dona Chiquitota.

==== Club de Regatas Botafogo ====
In 1891, with the participation of members from the Guanabarense Club, founded in 1874, the Grupo de Regatas Botafogo was established by rower Luiz Caldas, known as Almirante. During the Revolt of the Navy, two revolutionary leaders, Admiral Custódio de Melo and Commander Guilherme Frederico de Lorena, had their sons, João Carlos de Melo (John) and Frederico Lorena (Fritz), as members of the group. Their involvement raised government suspicions, leading to the group being forced to cease activities. As a result, John and Fritz left Rio de Janeiro, and Luiz Caldas was arrested.

Caldas died in late June 1894. The remaining members of the group then organized the founding of the club. With forty members, the Club de Regatas Botafogo was established on July 1, 1894.

The club's headquarters were located in a now-demolished mansion on the south side of Botafogo Beach, near Morro do Pasmado, where Avenida Pasteur ends today. The founders included Alberto Lisboa da Cunha, Arnaldo Pereira Braga, Arthur Galvão, Augusto Martins, Carlos de Souza Freire, Eduardo Fonseca, Frederico Lorena, Henrique Jacutinga, João Penaforte, José Maria Dias Braga, Julio Kreisler, Julio Ribas Junior, Luiz Fonseca Quintanilha Jordão, Oscar Lisboa da Cunha, and Paulo Ernesto de Azevedo. The boat Diva, launched in 1899, became a legend on Guanabara Bay by winning all 22 regattas it entered, earning the club the Rio de Janeiro championship that year.

Club de Regatas Botafogo was the first team from Rio de Janeiro to win a Brazilian championship in any sport, achieved in October 1902 through the victory of athlete Antônio Mendes de Oliveira Castro, who later became the club's president.

On October 25, 1903, before the founding of Botafogo Football Club, Botafogo rowers joined Flamengo rowers for a friendly football match. The Botafogo team—comprising W. Schuback, C. Freire, Oscar Cox, A. Shorts, M. Rocha, R. Rocha, G. Masset, F. Frias Júnior, Horácio Costa Santos, N. Hime, and H. Chaves Júnior—defeated Flamengo 5–1 at the Paissandu pitch. Some Botafogo players were also part of the newly formed Fluminense team.

Though Club de Regatas and the Football Club were separate, there was a sense of unity between them. In 1942, during a match in the Carioca Basketball Championship, Botafogo FC player Armando Albano collapsed and died on the court. Following this, the clubs' presidents initiated the merger process that led to the creation of Botafogo de Futebol e Regatas. The union was finalized on December 8, 1942, marking the official dissolution of Club de Regatas Botafogo.

=== Botafogo de Futebol e Regatas ===
Born from the union of Club de Regatas Botafogo and Botafogo Football Club, Botafogo de Futebol e Regatas was officially founded on 8 December 1942, the day of the Immaculate Conception, the club's patron saint. Discussions about the merger had begun as early as 1931 but faced resistance. Figures such as rowing historian Antônio Mendes de Oliveira Castro and football representative João Saldanha opposed it, alleging that Regatas was influenced by Fluminense supporters—Botafogo's rival and the only major Rio club without a rowing department.

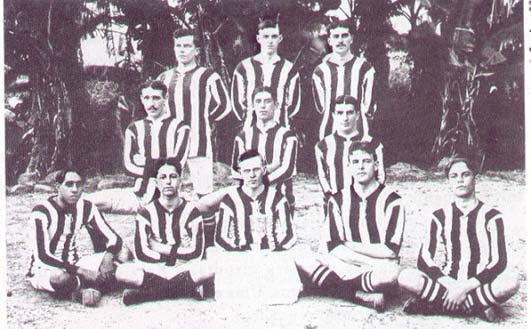
The Botafogo team in 1906, the first to wear the striped uniform

The merger was ultimately prompted by a tragedy. On 11 June 1942, during a basketball match for the Carioca Championship between the two Botafogo clubs, football player Armando Albano, also a Brazilian National Team team member, collapsed during halftime. He had arrived late from work and collapsed after bending to pick up a ball. Despite efforts to revive him, he died during the second half. The match was stopped at 23–21 in favor of the football club. As a tribute, Club de Regatas Botafogo ceded the match, allowing Albano a symbolic final victory. Deeply moved, the leaders of both clubs decided to proceed with the merger. Statements from both presidents reflected this unity:

"In the disputes between our clubs there can only be one winner, Botafogo!"

— Eduardo Góis Trindade, president of the Botafogo Football Club

"What else is needed for our two clubs to become one?"

— Augusto Frederico Schmidt, president of Club de Regatas Botafogo.

The merger process began immediately and was formalized about six months later. The new club retained the black and white striped flag, but the emblem with the intertwined "BFC" was replaced by a black shield with a white Lone Star. The rowing badge was also modified to match the new football crest, now featuring a black background with a white outline.

== Football ==
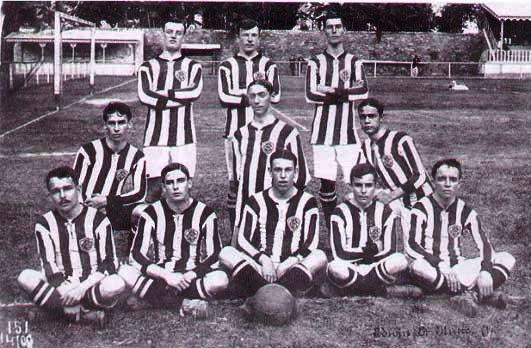
Botafogo state champion in 1910.

=== The 1900s and 1910s: The Glorious One ("O Glorioso") emerges ===
In 1906, Botafogo won its first trophy, the Caxambu Cup, the inaugural football competition in Rio de Janeiro for secondary teams. That same year, it debuted in the first edition of the Carioca Championship, finishing fourth. Its first victory in the competition was a 1–0 win over Bangu, with a goal by Gilbert Hime at the Estádio das Laranjeiras.

In 1907, Botafogo was involved in its first major controversy. Tied on points with Fluminense but with fewer goals scored, Botafogo contested the rival's self-declared championship title, arguing that a walkover win against Internacional had unfairly excluded them from improving their goal average. Fluminense relied on the Metropolitan Football League's statute, which used goal average as a tiebreaker, though it lacked regulatory authority. The dispute remained unresolved until 1996, when both clubs were declared co-champions.

In the 1909 Carioca Championship, Botafogo finished as runner-up but recorded the largest victory in Brazilian football history: a 24–0 win over Mangueira. The team scored 9 goals in the first half and 15 in the second, averaging one goal every 3.3 minutes. Gilbert Hime scored nine goals, followed by Flávio Ramos with seven.

In 1910, Botafogo won the Carioca Championship, scoring 66 goals in 10 matches. After an opening loss to America, the team rebounded with large victories, including 15–1 and 9–1 over Riachuelo, 7–0 over Haddock Lobo, and 6–0 over Rio Cricket. In the decisive match against Fluminense, Botafogo won 6–1, with three goals by top scorer Abelardo de Lamare. The title-clinching campaign ended with an 11–0 win over Haddock Lobo and earned the club the nickname O Glorioso ("The Glorious One"). That year, it also won the Interstate Trophy by defeating São Paulo champions AA Palmeiras 7–2.

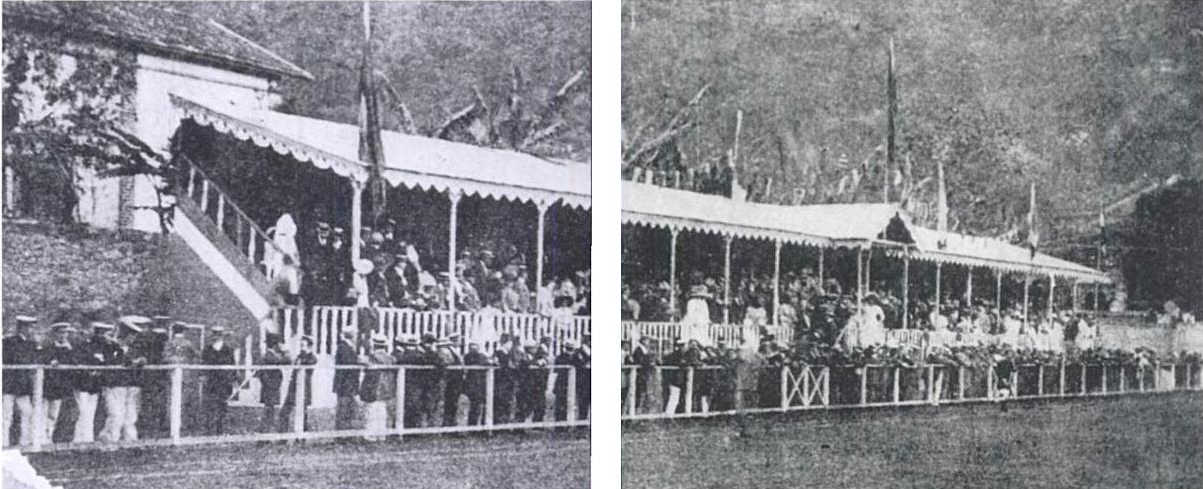
Old Stadium on Voluntários da Pátria Street

In 1911, Botafogo withdrew from the Metropolitan Athleticos Sports League (LMSA), which it had helped found in 1908. The decision followed a violent match against America that led to harsh suspensions for players Adhemaro and Abelardo de Lamare. In protest, the club left the league and played only friendly matches for a period. Later that year, it gave up its Campo da Rua Voluntários da Pátria headquarters for financial reasons. In 1912, now affiliated with the Football Association of Rio de Janeiro (AFRJ), Botafogo won another Carioca Championship, playing at the Rua São Clemente field.

=== The 1910s and 1920s: the black-and-white hiatus ===
Between 1912 and 1930, Botafogo experienced its first title drought. Despite this, it won the Carioca Second Division in 1915 and 1922. The club was runner-up in the First Division four times—in 1913, 1914, 1916, and 1918—and had several top scorers during the period, including Mimi Sodré, Luís Menezes, Aluízio Pinto, and Arlindo Pacheco.

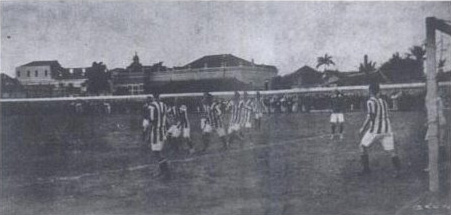
Inauguration match of General Severiano Stadium, in 1913

In the early 1910s, the club inaugurated the General Severiano Stadium, defeating Flamengo 1–0 in the opening match with a goal by Mimi Sodré. Around this time, the term cartola (top hat) began being used to refer to football directors. One version credits this to Uruguayan club Dublin's officials arriving in top hats for a friendly in Rio in 1917; another attributes it to Botafogo officials dressing formally to welcome the visitors.

In the 1920s, the club's best result was third place in the 1928 Carioca Championship. In 1923, it narrowly avoided relegation by defeating Villa Isabel 3–1 in a playoff. Internal issues also marked this period. In 1924, the departure of manager Oldemar Amaral Murtinho led to the exit of striker Nilo, who joined Fluminense but returned in 1927 and became that year's top scorer.

=== 1930s: The four-time champion ===
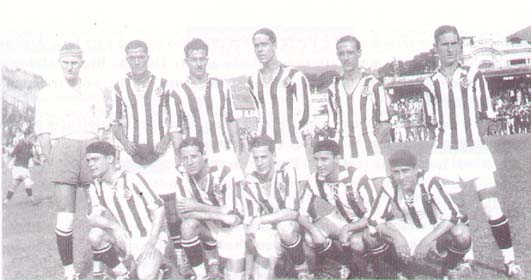
State champion team in 1930

Botafogo returned to prominence in the 1930s. Led by strikers Nilo and Carvalho Leite, it won the 1930 Carioca Championship. In 1931, the club finished fourth in the state league and won the Rio–São Paulo State Champions Cup, defeating Corinthians 7–1, with four goals by Nilo.

Botafogo won the 1932 Carioca title with two rounds to spare. In 1933, the league split into AMEA and the newly formed LCF, which aimed to professionalize the sport. Botafogo remained with AMEA, winning the 1933 and 1934 championships. In 1935, with the creation of the Metropolitan Sports Federation (FMD), Botafogo won its fourth consecutive title, becoming the first professional state champion recognized by the Brazilian Sports Confederation. The standout player was Leônidas da Silva, who joined from Flamengo and played until early 1936.

In 1936, Botafogo embarked on its first international tour, playing nine matches in Mexico and the United States, with six wins, one draw, and two losses. The following year, renovations began at General Severiano Stadium, including the addition of concrete bleachers. In the 1938 reopening match, Botafogo defeated Fluminense 3–2.

The club had significant representation in the 1934 World Cup in Italy, contributing nine players: goalkeepers Germano and Pedrosa, defender Octacílio, midfielders Ariel, Canalli, Martim Silveira and Waldyr, and the attacking duo Áttila and Carvalho Leite.

=== 1940s: The fasting of Heleno de Freitas ===
In the early 1940s, following the 1942 merger of Botafogo's rowing and football departments, the club featured notable players such as Gérson dos Santos, Tovar, and Zezé Procópio but failed to secure major titles. One of the club's greatest idols, the controversial striker Heleno de Freitas, also left without winning significant trophies, aside from the 1947 Início Cup and minor competitions. Between 1940 and 1948, Heleno scored 209 goals in 235 matches, forming part of an offensive quintet alongside Tesourinha, Zizinho, Jair Rosa Pinto, and Ademir Menezes, considered among the best in Brazilian football history.

After Heleno's departure in 1948, Botafogo ended a long title drought by winning the Carioca Championship. Following three consecutive runner-up finishes, Botafogo began the tournament with a 4–0 loss to São Cristóvão but remained unbeaten thereafter under coach Zezé Moreira and leaders Octávio Moraes and Sylvio Pirillo. In the final match, Botafogo defeated Vasco da Gama—nicknamed the Expresso da Vitória ("Victory Express")—3–1 to claim the title.

The 1948 championship also marked the emergence of one of the club's mascots. During a preliminary match against Madureira, a dog named Biriba, owned by reserve defender Macaé, ran onto the field as if celebrating Botafogo's 10–2 victory. Club president Carlito Rocha, charmed by Biriba's black-and-white fur, adopted the dog as the team's mascot. Biriba became a fixture at matches, and whenever Botafogo was trailing, the dog was released onto the field to halt play—after which the team often managed to reverse the score.

=== 1950s and 1960s: Golden Age ===
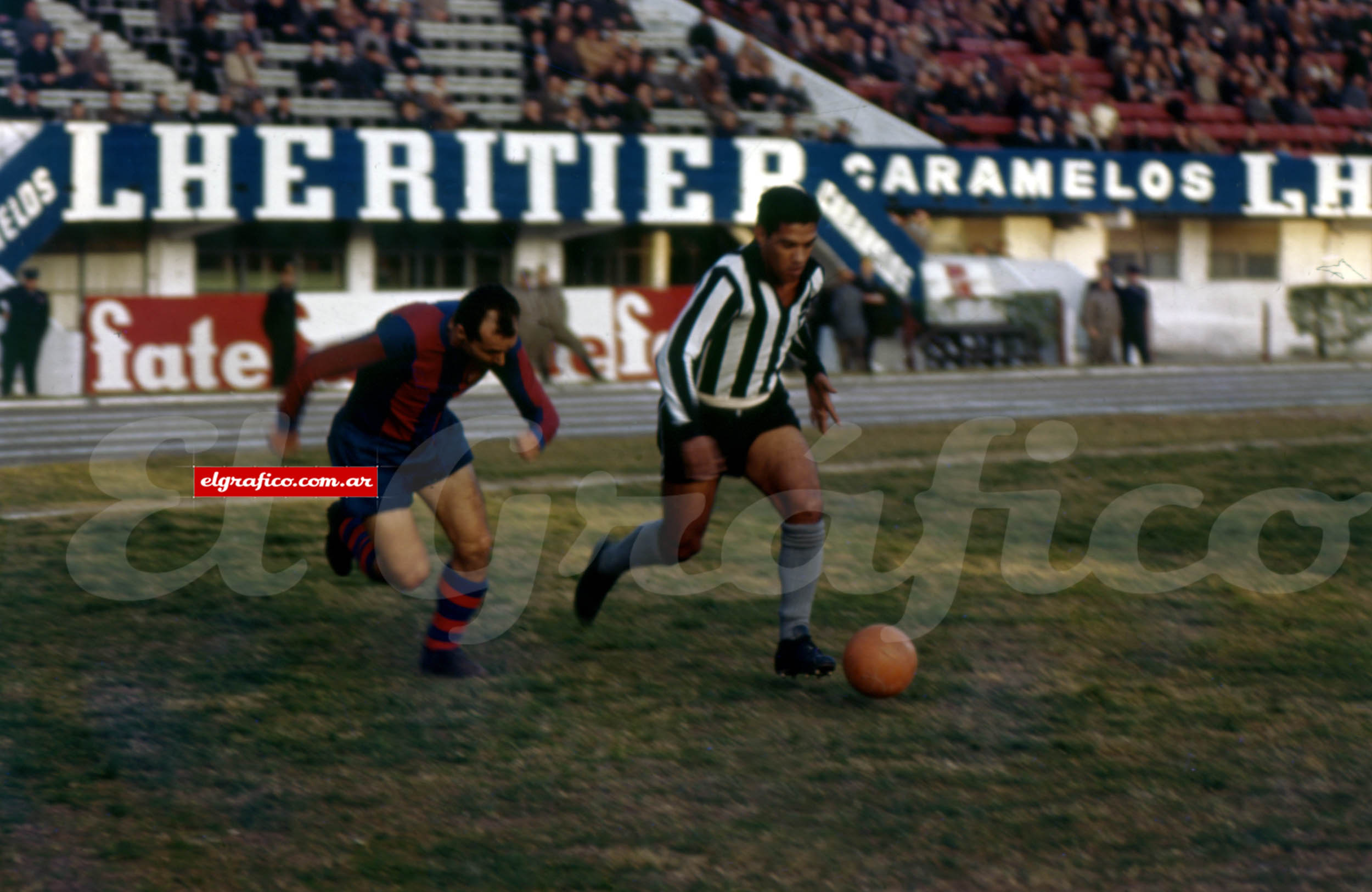
Garrincha playing for Botafogo in a 2–0 victory over Barcelona in 1964 for the Copa Iberoamericana, a friendly tournament held in Buenos Aires

In the 1950s and 1960s, Botafogo experienced one of its greatest periods, featuring stars of the Brazilian National Team such as Manga, Zagallo, Didi, Quarentinha, Amarildo, Roberto Miranda, Caju, Sebastião Leônidas, Paulo Valentim, Rogério, Gérson, and Carlos Roberto. The era also included the club's greatest idols: Nilton Santos, regarded as the best left-back ever, and Garrincha, considered by many the greatest footballer in history.

In 1951, Botafogo finished third in the Santiago International Tournament and won the Municipal Tournament, earning an invitation to the inaugural Small Club World Cup, in Venezuela.

In 1957, sports columnist and club director João Saldanha was appointed coach, leading Botafogo to the Carioca Championship with a historic 6–2 final win over Fluminense, the highest-scoring final to date. Botafogo also finished runner-up in the Small Club World Cup that year.

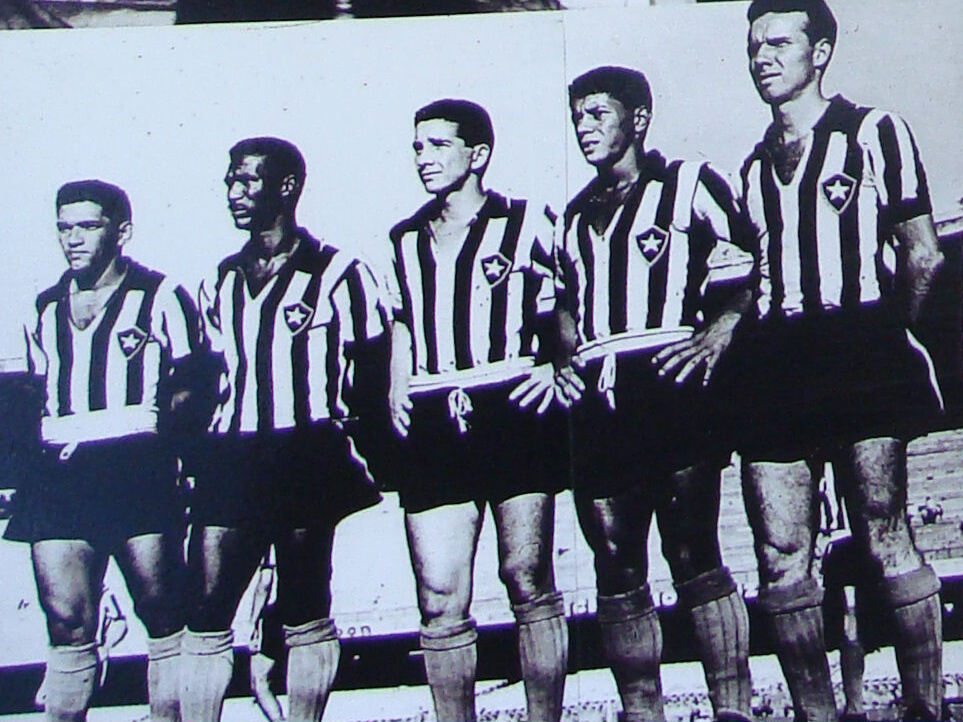
In the front line, four champions of the 1962 World Cup: Garrincha, Didi, Amarildo and Zagallo, as well as Amoroso

In 1958, key players Garrincha, Nilton Santos, Didi, and Zagallo helped Brazil win its first World Cup. Despite their absence, Botafogo won the João Teixeira de Carvalho Tournament and recorded a 5–0 victory over Vasco da Gama—their biggest win against the rival.

The club continued to compete internationally, finishing runner-up in the 1958 Mexico Pentagonal and 1959 Teresa Herrera Trophy, and winning the 1960 Torneio Internacional de Colombia. In 1961, Botafogo won the Início Cup and the Carioca Championship, defeating Flamengo 3–0 in the final. That year, they also won tournaments in Costa Rica.

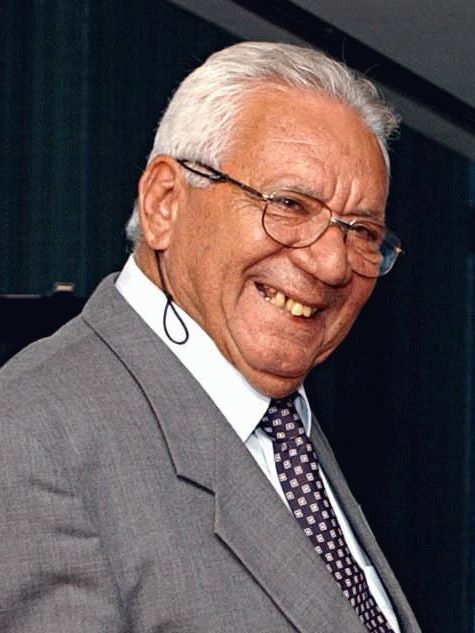
Nilton Santos wore only two jerseys in his entire career: Botafogo's and the Brazilian National Team's.

In 1962, Botafogo won three titles: the Carioca Championship (again over Flamengo), the Rio-São Paulo Tournament, and the Pentagonal Tournament in Mexico. Garrincha led Brazil to another World Cup victory, alongside five Botafogo teammates.

In 1963, Botafogo reached the national final but lost to Santos and was eliminated by the same team in the Libertadores semi-finals. They won the Paris International Tournament, defeating Racing Paris.

In 1964, Botafogo shared the Rio-São Paulo title with Santos after winning the first playoff match; the second was canceled due to both teams touring abroad. The club also won the Panamaribo Cup and the Golden Jubilee Tournament. Nilton Santos retired that year after 721 games.

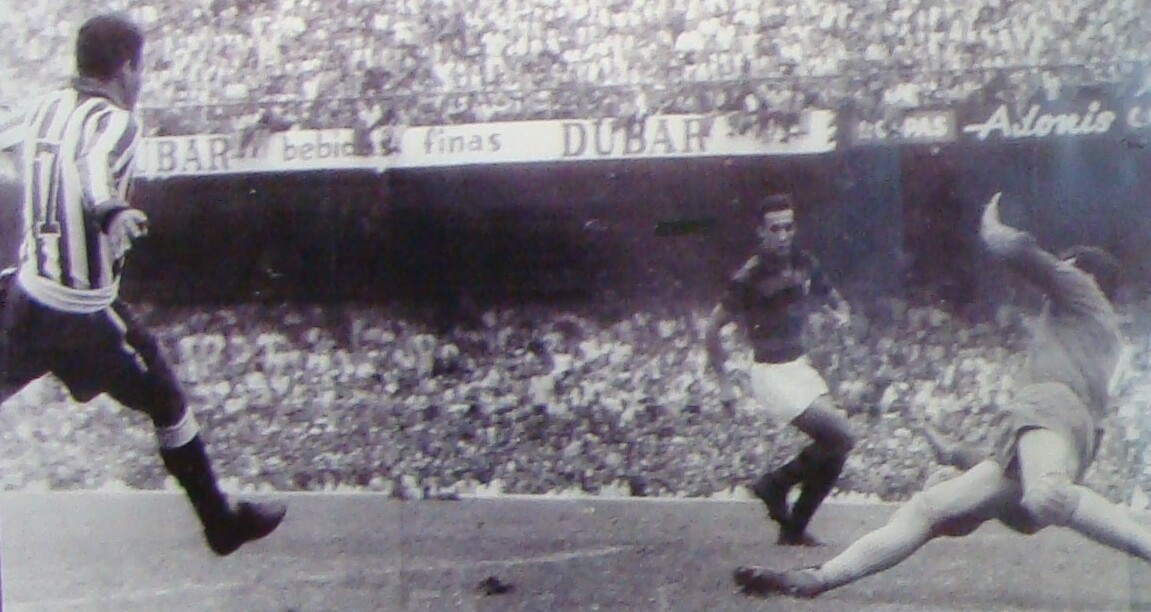
Garrincha, Joy of the people, at Maracanã in the 60s

By 1965, injuries forced Garrincha's decline and eventual departure. Despite losing its icons, Botafogo won the Círculo de Periódicos Esportivos Cup and Carranza Cup in 1966, and the Caracas Triangular Trophy three times between 1967 and 1970, as well as the 1968 Mexico Hexagonal Tournament.

Under coach Zagallo in 1967 and 1968, Botafogo won the Guanabara Cup and the Carioca Championship twice, defeating major rivals including Flamengo and Vasco da Gama. In 1969, Botafogo won the 1968 Brazil Cup, later recognized by the Brazilian Football Confederation as a national championship, marking the club's first official Brazilian title.

=== 1970s and 1980s: 21 years of drama ===
From the Brazil Cup victory in 1968 to the Carioca Championship in 1989, Botafogo went 21 years without winning an official title, accumulating runner-up finishes and third and fourth places.

The final stretch of the 1971 Carioca Championship was marked by disappointment. With four recent World Cup winners (Carlos Alberto Torres, Brito, Paulo César Caju, and Jairzinho), Botafogo dominated the tournament but stumbled in the last rounds. In the final match against Fluminense, needing only a draw, they conceded a controversial goal in the 88th minute. Fluminense's Marco Antônio collided with Botafogo's goalkeeper Ubirajara, who claimed to have been pushed. On the rebound, Lula scored the winning goal. In the Brazilian Championship, the team reached the semi-finals with São Paulo and Atlético Mineiro, but lost both matches and placed third.

In 1972, the team reached the Brazilian Championship final after eliminating Corinthians in the semi-final. A 0–0 draw against Palmeiras handed the title to the São Paulo club, which had more points. That year, Botafogo also defeated Flamengo 6–0 on their rival's birthday.

In 1973, after ten years, Botafogo returned to the Libertadores Cup. They led a group with Brazilian and Uruguayan teams and advanced after defeating Palmeiras 2–1 in a tiebreaker. In the semi-final round, they were eliminated in a triangular stage with Cerro Porteño and Colo Colo. In 1975, Botafogo won the Augusto Pereira da Mota Cup, the second round of the Carioca Championship, but lost the final to Fluminense. The following year, they again won the second round, then called the José Wânder Rodrigues Mendes Cup.

In 1976, amid a financial crisis, Botafogo sold its headquarters in General Severiano to Vale do Rio Doce; sparking outrage among fans and club officials, including former president Carlito Rocha. Nilton Santos lamented that “his Botafogo no longer existed." Before moving operations to Marechal Hermes, the club was left without a training field until its new stadium opened in 1978.

During this period, Botafogo was nicknamed "Time do Camburão" ("Paddy Wagon Team") due to its reliance on aging and problematic players. Despite this, the club set two national records: 52 matches unbeaten in national football and 42 unbeaten in the Brazilian Championship. Still, they placed 5th in 1977 and 9th in 1978. In 1979, the club played only seven matches and finished 53rd, its worst performance in the competition.

In 1981, Botafogo reached the semi-final of the Brazilian Championship with players such as Paulo Sérgio, Mendonça, and Marcelo Oliveira. They won the first leg against São Paulo 1–0 at Maracanã. In the return at Morumbi, Botafogo led 2–1 at halftime, but the restart was delayed for 35 minutes amid accusations of referee coercion. São Paulo turned the match around and advanced, in a game marked by controversial decisions, including a disputed penalty awarded to the hosts.

In the 1986 Brazilian Championship, Botafogo finished 31st, below the cutoff for the 1987 season due to a planned reduction from 48 to 28 teams. However, a legal dispute involving Vasco da Gama, Joinville, and Portuguesa, led the CBF to alter the rules during the competition, allowing more teams into the next phase. This controversy contributed to the creation of the Clube dos 13 ("Club of the 13"). With the CBF unable to organize the 1987 championship, the Clube dos 13 launched the União Cup, including Botafogo and three invited clubs: Coritiba, Santa Cruz, and Goiás. Following the competition's success, the CBF organized a parallel tournament with the excluded teams.

In 1988, Botafogo remained in the Brazilian Championship with the União Cup teams and finished 17th, eliminated in the first round. The most memorable moment was a 3–0 loss to Vasco da Gama, after which 11-year-old ball girl Sonja Martinelli tearfully declared her love for the club. At that point, Botafogo had gone 20 years without a title.

Between 1968 and 1989, the club's main achievements were summer tournaments abroad, such as the Triangular Trophy in Caracas and the City Trophy in Palma de Mallorca. The drought ended on 21 June 1989, when Botafogo, led by Mauro Galvão, Paulinho Criciúma, and Josimar, won the Carioca Championship, undefeated. After a 0–0 draw in the first leg, they beat Flamengo 1–0 in the second, with a controversial goal by Maurício, following a cross from Mazolinha.

=== 1990s: More titles and the "Tuliomania" ===
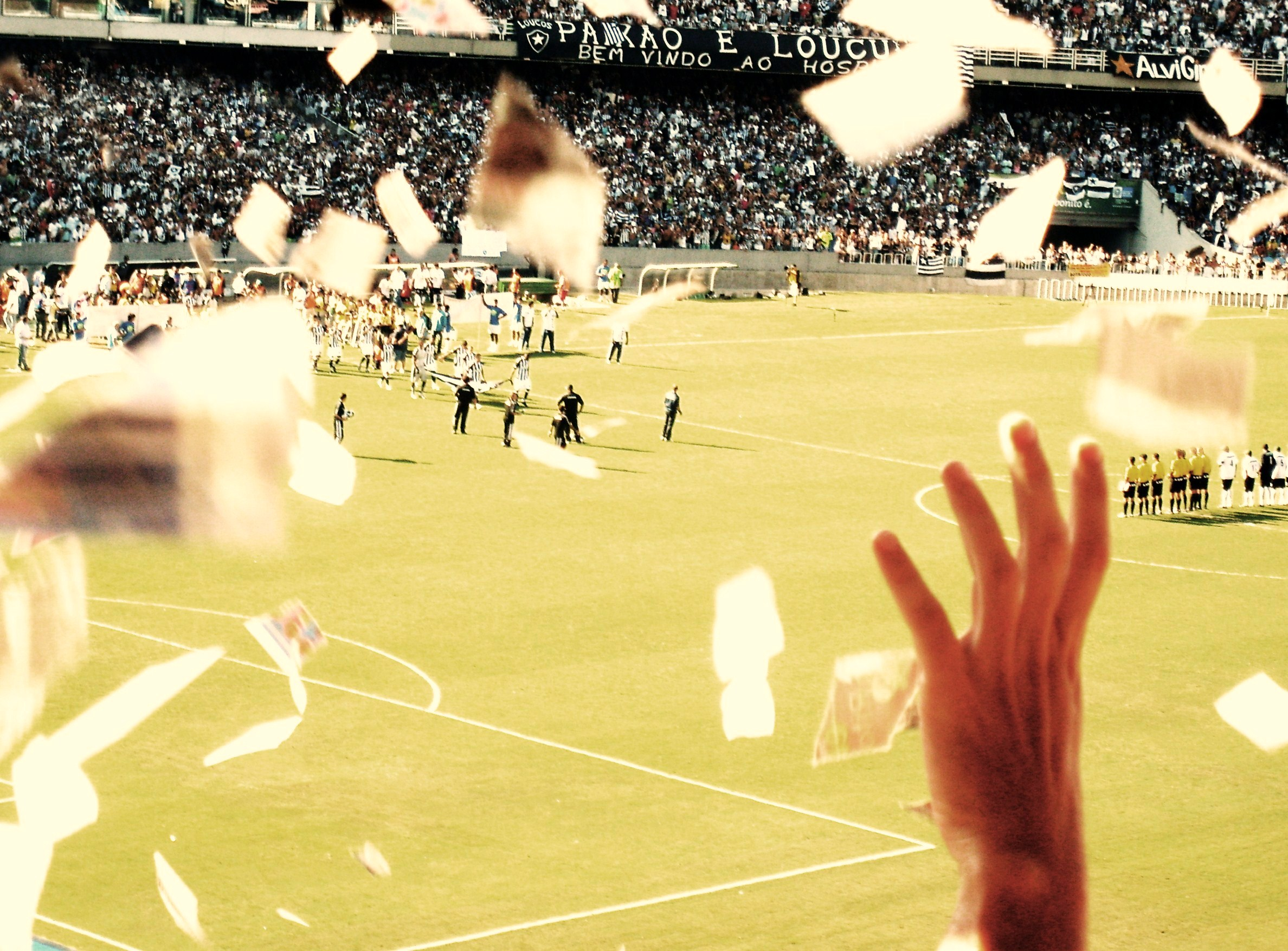
Black-and-whites fans in celebration at Maracanã

The year after one of the most important titles in its history, Botafogo repeated its triumph in the State Championship. The final against Vasco was marked by controversy and featured players such as Valdeir, Carlos Alberto Dias, Carlos Alberto Santos, and Djair.

In 1992, the club returned to a Brazilian Championship final after twenty years, facing Flamengo. Before the first leg, star player Renato Gaúcho made a public bet with Flamengo striker Gaúcho: if Botafogo lost, he would host a barbecue for the opponents. After a 3–0 defeat, Renato honored the bet, angering president Emil Pinheiro and fans, leading to his removal from the second match. In the return leg, Botafogo drew 2–2. The match was overshadowed by the worst tragedy in Maracanã's history: a guardrail collapse in the upper tier of the Flamengo section caused three deaths and 90 injuries. The stadium was closed for seven months.

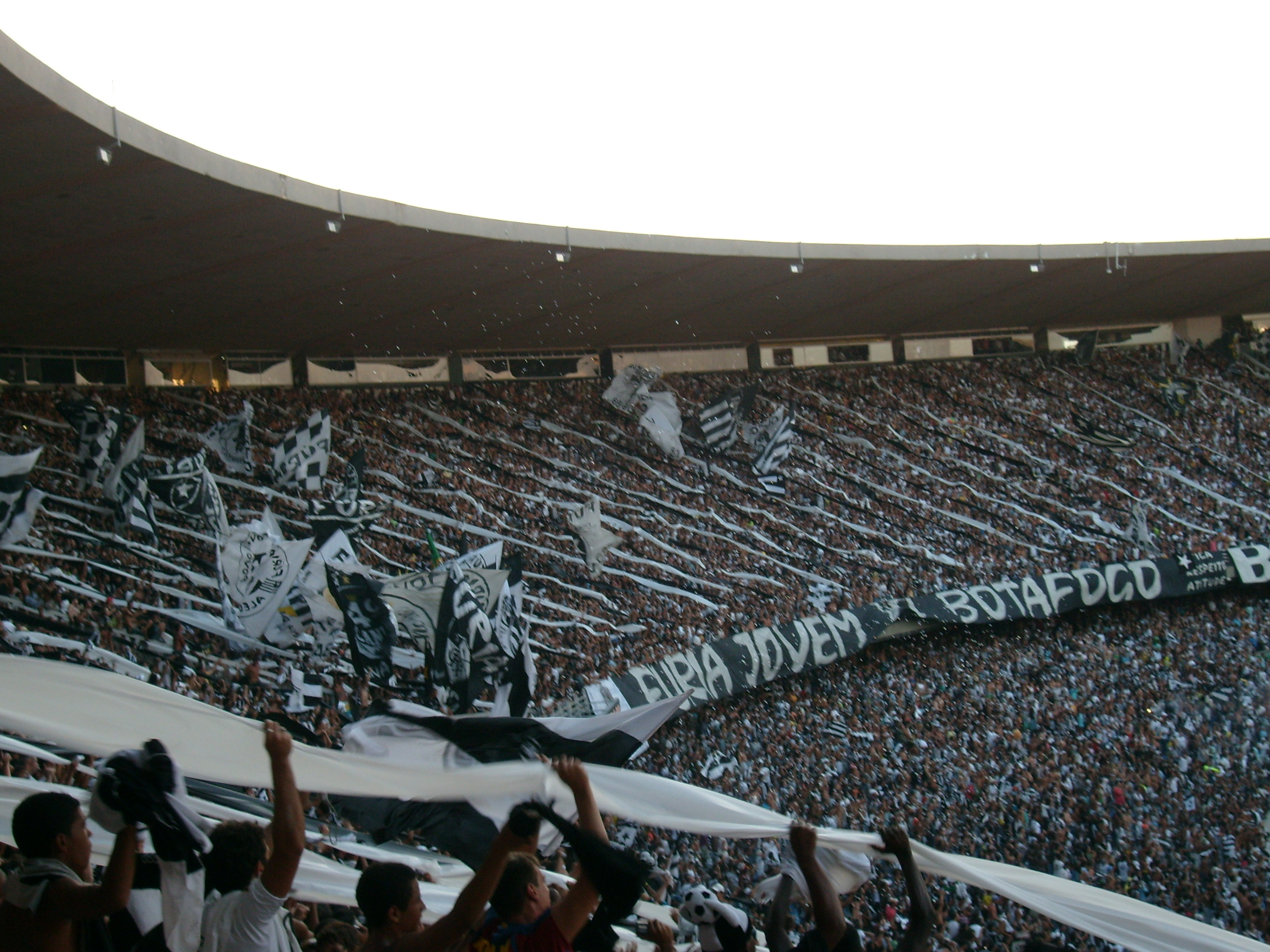
Botafogo was the first Rio de Janeiro club to win an international title at the Maracanã, in 1993.

By finishing second in the national league, Botafogo qualified for the 1993 CONMEBOL Cup. Without the main players from the previous season and lacking basic resources, the team, coached by Carlos Alberto Torres, won its first official international title. With Sinval and goalkeeper Willian Bacana as standouts, Botafogo defeated Bragantino, Caracas, and Atlético Mineiro before facing Peñarol in the final. After a 1–1 draw in Montevideo, the return leg at Maracanã ended 2–2, and Botafogo won the penalty shootout 3–1, with two saves by Willian Bacana. Attendance exceeded 40,000, although only 26,276 paid for tickets. Meanwhile, in the Brazilian Championship, the team finished 31st.

In 1994, Botafogo competed in the South American Recopa against São Paulo, champions of the Libertadores Cup and Libertadores Supercup, and lost 3–1 in a single match in Kōbe, Japan. That year also marked the club's return to its General Severiano headquarters. In the national league, Botafogo reached the quarterfinals, finishing 5th. Túlio Maravilha was the top scorer, tied with Guarani's Amoroso, with 19 goals.

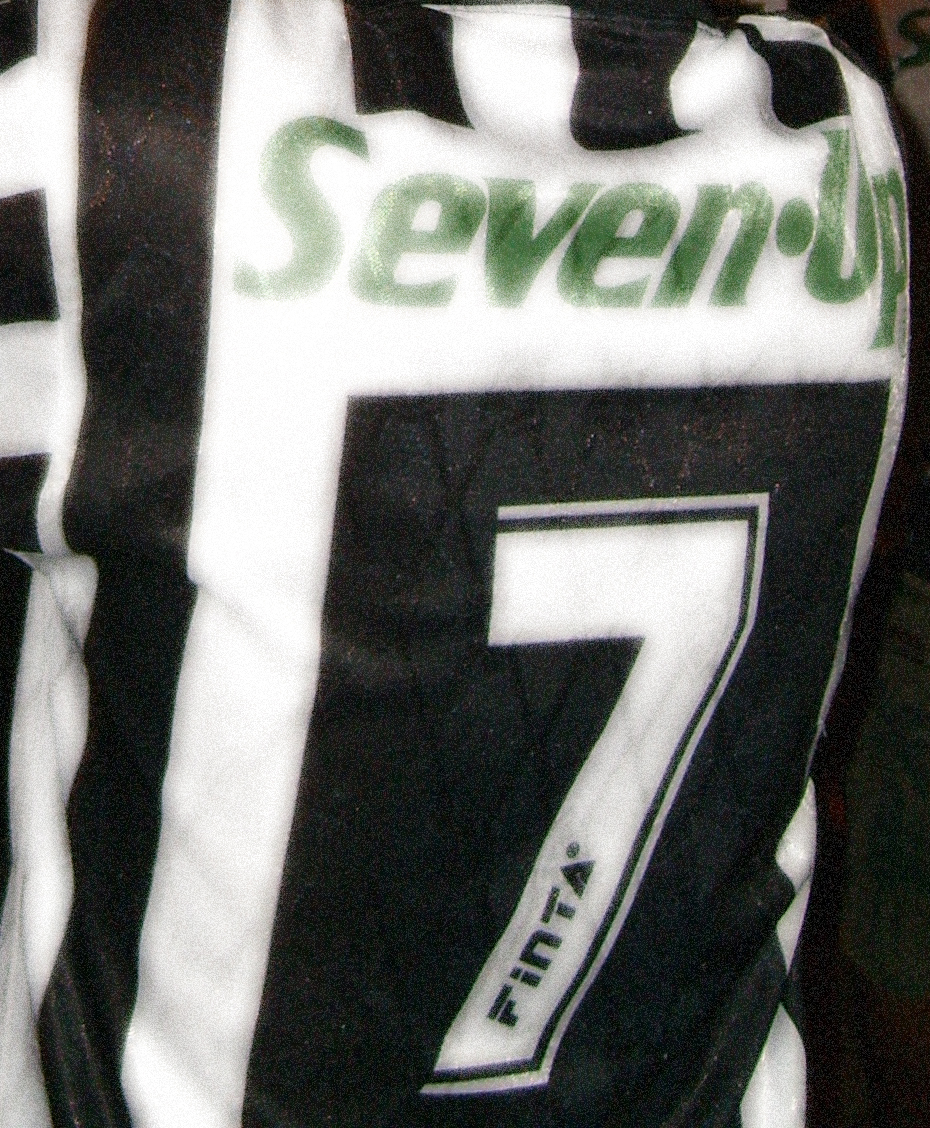
With Túlio Maravilha wearing the No. 7 jersey and the 7 Up sponsorship, Botafogo won the 1995 Brasileirão and boosted the soft drink brand's sales.

In 1995, Túlio again led the Carioca Championship in scoring with 27 goals and declared himself the "King of Rio," competing with Renato Gaúcho, from Fluminense; Romário, from Flamengo; and Valdir Bigode, from Vasco da Gama. Despite his performance, Botafogo placed third. The highlight of the year was the Brazilian Championship title—its first under CBF. The team, led by new coach Paulo Autuori, included Gonçalves, Donizete, Sérgio Manoel, Wilson Gottardo, and Wágner. Despite late salaries and internal tensions, the squad reached the final after eliminating Cruzeiro.

In the first leg, Botafogo beat Santos 2–1 at Maracanã, though a legal goal by Túlio was disallowed. The second match, in Pacaembu, ended 1–1 in a game with several controversial decisions by referee Márcio Rezende de Freitas. The result secured the title for Botafogo and solidified Túlio's place as a club idol. He was the championship's top scorer with 23 goals.

In 1996, the team was largely dismantled but still won several titles, including the Cidade Maravilhosa Cup, Teresa Herrera Trophy (against Juventus), Nippon Ham Cup, in Osaka, Japan, and the Russian President's Tournament in Vladikavkaz. In the Libertadores Cup, the club was eliminated in the round of 16 by Grêmio. In the national league, it finished 17th.

In 1997, Botafogo won another State Championship, again defeating Vasco with a goal by substitute Dimba. 1998, using much of the same squad, the club won its fourth Rio-São Paulo Tournament, defeating São Paulo. A 3–2 win at Morumbi and a draw at Maracanã secured the title.

In 1999, coached by Bebeto and Rodrigo, Botafogo were runners-up in the Brazil Cup after losing the final to Juventude. The second leg at Maracanã drew 101,581 spectators—the last time the stadium hosted over 100,000 people and the largest crowd in Brazil Cup history.

At the turn of the century, FIFA included Botafogo among the greatest clubs of the 20th century, alongside only two other Brazilian clubs: Santos and Flamengo.

=== The 2000s: Era of crisis ===
In the early 2000s, Botafogo faced recurring threats of relegation in the Brazilian Championship. In 1999, the club avoided relegation due to points gained in court from the Sandro Hiroshi case. Poor performances followed in 2000 and 2001, and relegation ultimately came in 2002. The period was marked by weak squads, delayed wages, poor management, low attendance, and the emergence of repressive fan movements.

Ahead of the 2002 season, several players left the club. With a weakened squad led by defender Sandro and midfielder Galeano, and coached primarily by Ivo Wortmann (later replaced by Carlos Alberto Torres), Botafogo was relegated after a 1–0 defeat to São Paulo, with a goal by Dill.

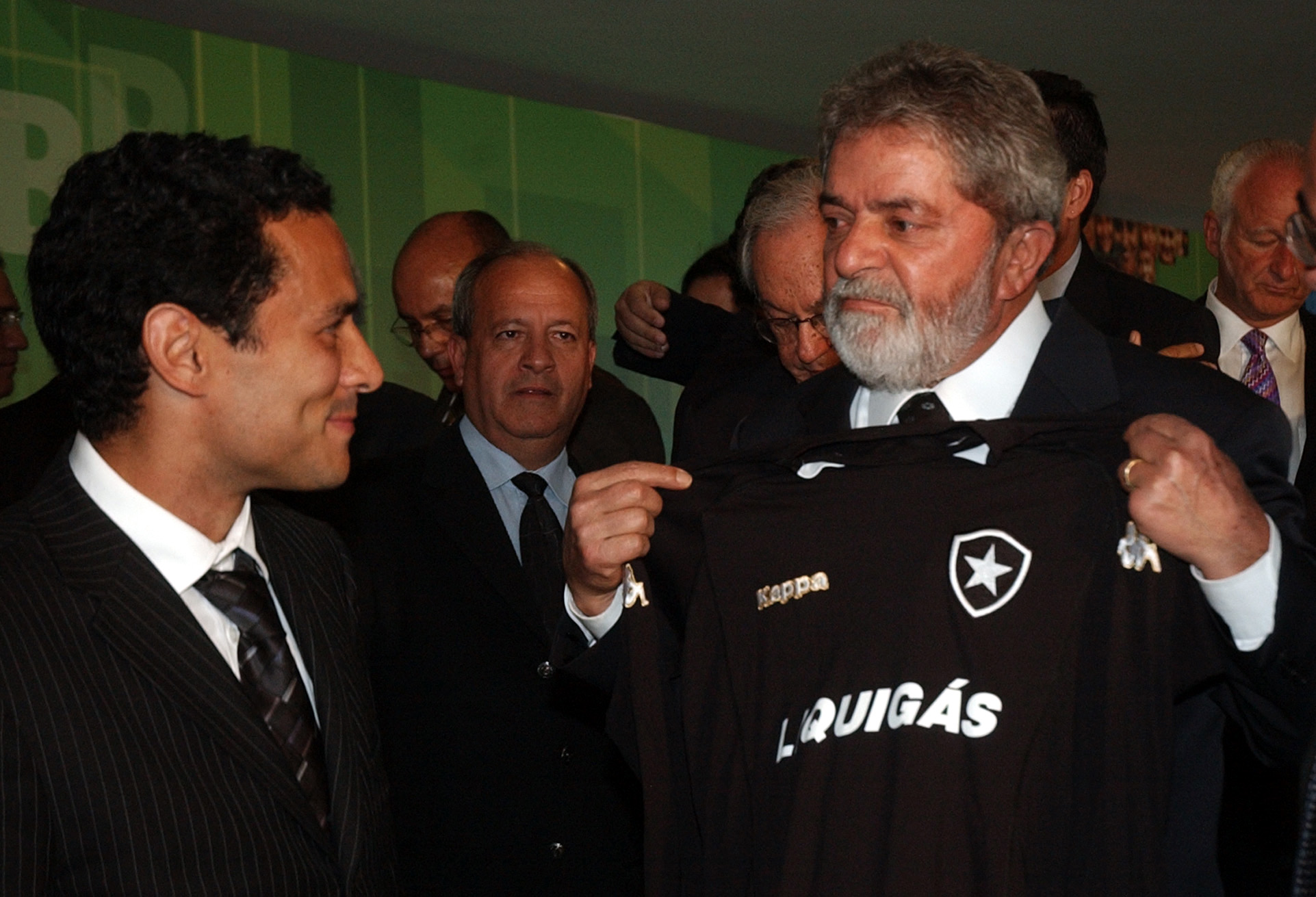
Túlio Guerreiro and Bebeto de Freitas give a Botafogo jersey to then-president Lula

At the end of the year, Mauro Ney Palmeiro's presidency ended and he was succeeded by Bebeto de Freitas, a former athlete and volleyball coach. The club was mired in crisis: in debt, without sponsors, lacking training facilities, and with players unwilling to play. The 2003 Carioca Championship served as a test run, but the team failed to reach the semi-finals.

In the B Series, Botafogo lost its opener to Vila Nova and only won its first match in the third round, against CRB. The club briefly led the table but finished second in the first phase. In the next phase, it again finished second, behind Marília. In the final quadrangular with Palmeiras, Marília, and Sport, Botafogo secured promotion with one round to spare, beating Marília 3–1 at Caio Martins. The squad, featuring Sandro, Túlio Guerreiro, Valdo, and Leandrão, finished as runners-up.

In 2004, the club's centennial year, Botafogo had another poor season, exiting early from both the Carioca Championship and the Brazil Cup. In the national league, they narrowly avoided relegation by drawing 1–1 with Athletico Paranaense in the final round.

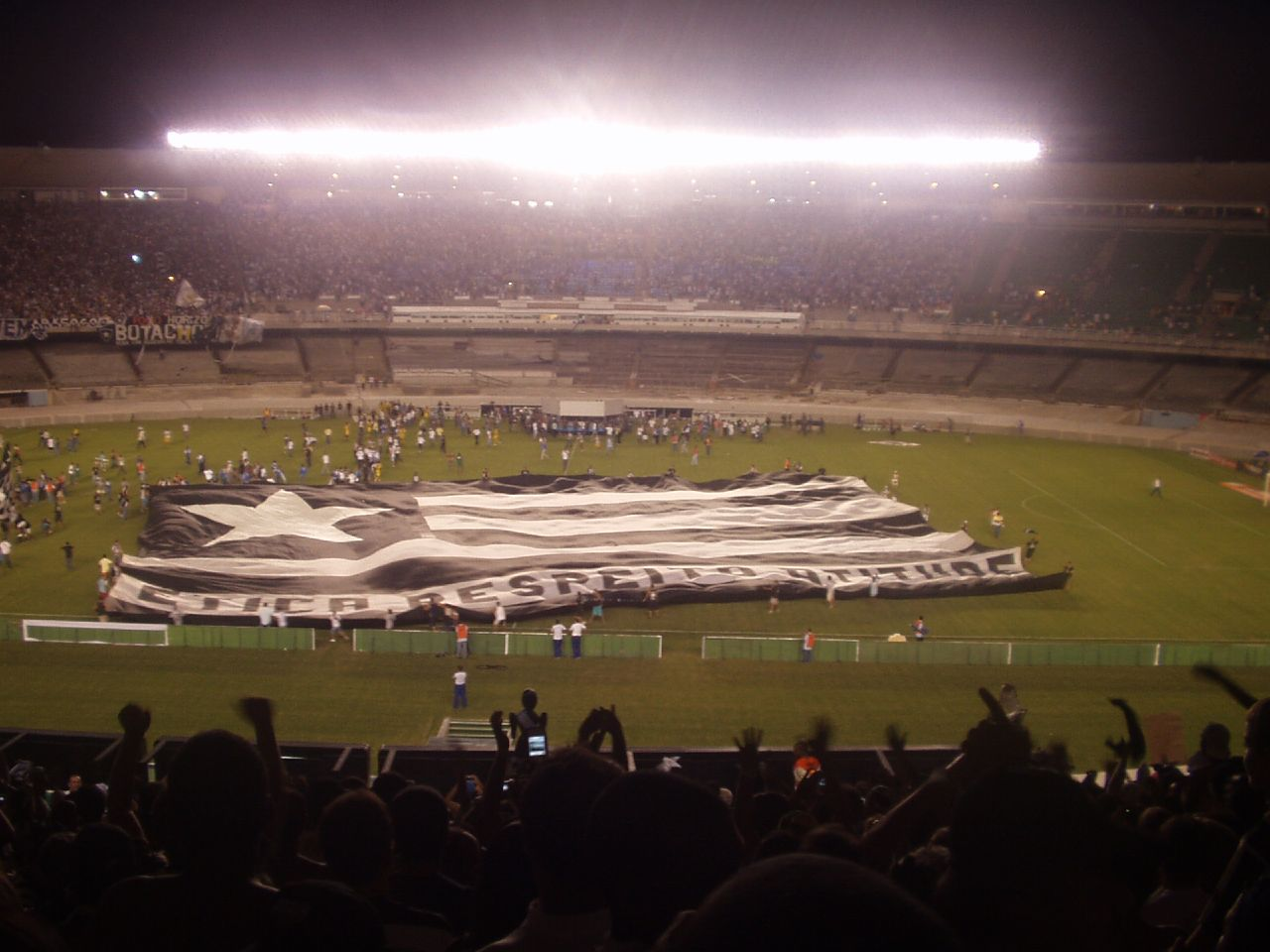
Celebration of the 2006 state title, at Maracanã Stadium

By 2005, the club began a slow administrative recovery. In 2006, under coach Carlos Roberto and with players like Dodô, Lúcio Flávio, Zé Roberto, and Scheidt, Botafogo ended an eight-year title drought by winning the Guanabara Cup and later the Carioca Championship. Cuca took over later that year and in 2007 led a team praised for its modern style—earning the nickname Carrossel Alvinegro—featuring Dodô, Zé Roberto, Lúcio Flávio, Jorge Henrique, and Túlio Guerreiro.

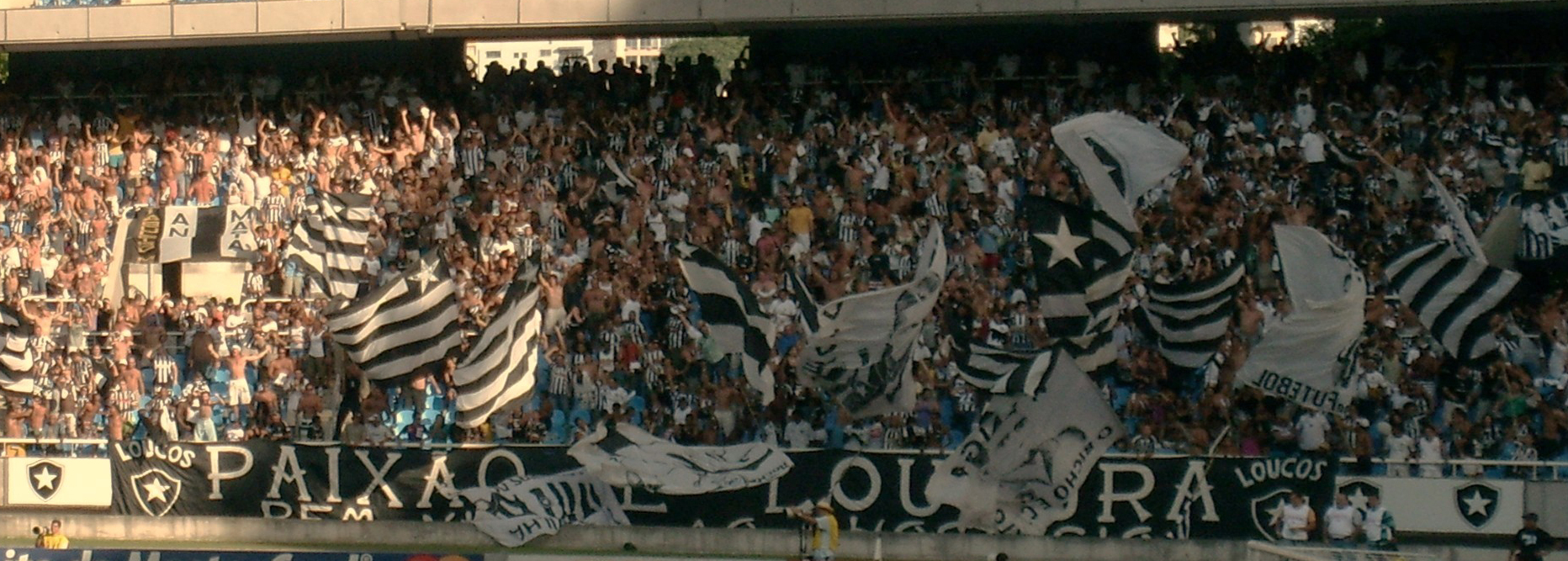
Fans at Nilton Santos Stadium in 2009

Despite strong performances, 2007 was marked by disappointments. Botafogo won the Rio Cup but lost the state title to Flamengo after two 2–2 draws and a penalty shootout. Controversy surrounded the second leg when a legal goal by Dodô was wrongly disallowed for offside in the 44th minute, and he was later sent off. In the Brazil Cup, the team was eliminated in the semi-finals by Figueirense after two disallowed goals, prompting assistant referee Ana Paula Oliveira's removal from the sport.

Botafogo led the Brazilian Championship for 11 rounds and finished the first half in second place but fell to ninth after internal issues. In the Sudamericana Cup, the team was eliminated by River Plate in the round of 16 after conceding a stoppage-time goal while playing with a two-man advantage. The year's highlight was the acquisition of the Nilton Santos Olympic Stadium (then João Havelange), leased from the city until 2027.

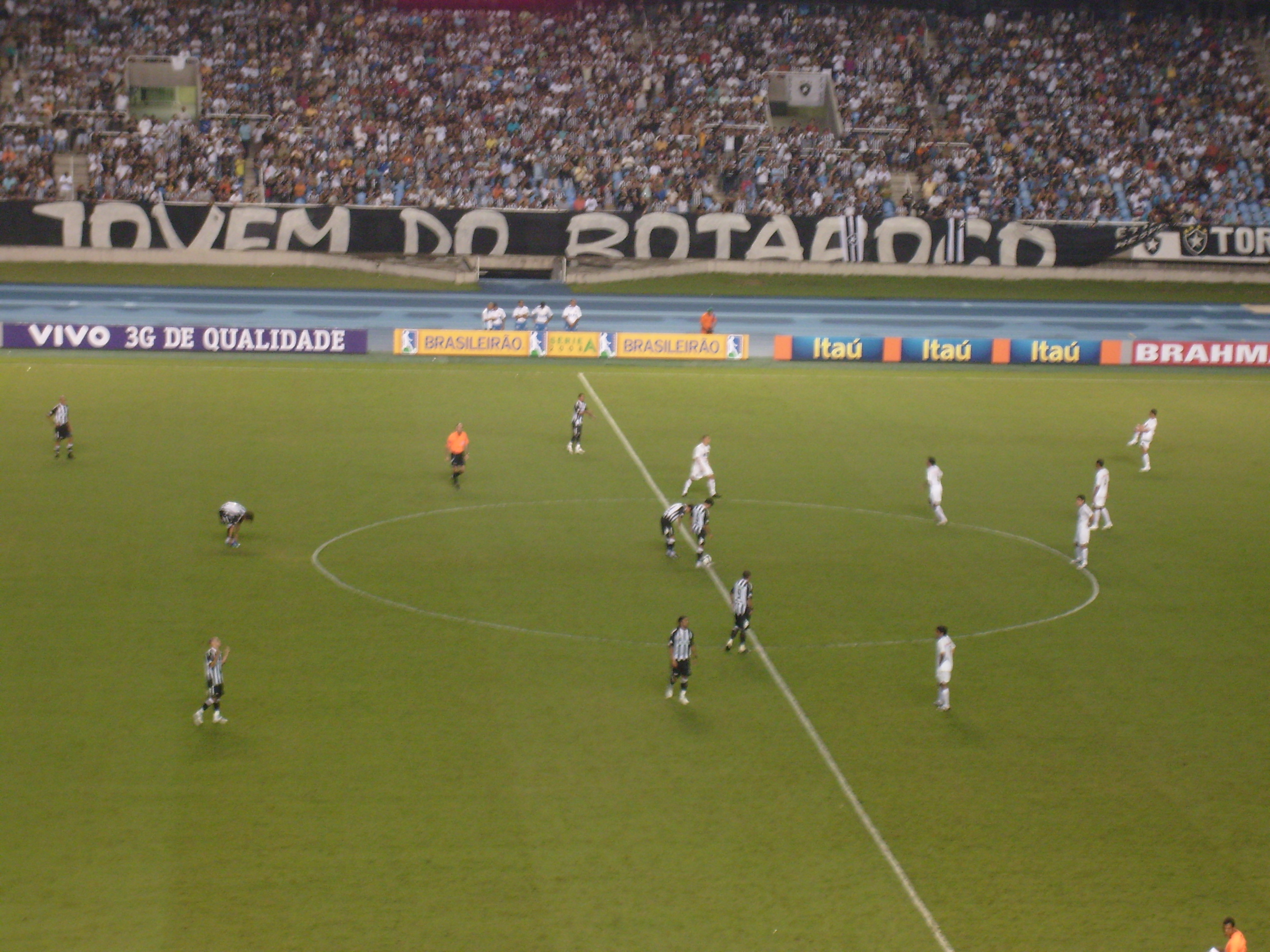
Botafogo against Santos, at Engenhão, in October 2008

In 2008, Botafogo won the pre-season Peregrino Cup but had similar outcomes to 2007 in official competitions. It won the Rio Cup against Fluminense but again lost the Carioca final to Flamengo. In the Brazil Cup, it was eliminated in the semi-finals by Corinthians on penalties. In the 2008 Sudamericana Cup, the club reached the quarterfinals before falling to Estudiantes. In the league, Botafogo finished 7th.

In 2009, Mauricio Assumpção became president and inherited a restricted budget. Despite low expectations, Botafogo won the Guanabara Cup. In the Rio Cup, injuries to key players Maicosuel and Reinaldo during the first leg of the final affected the team, which lost to Flamengo after two 2–2 draws and penalties for the third consecutive year.

The Brazil Cup campaign ended in the second round with a penalty shootout loss to Americano. In the league, coach Ney Franco was dismissed after a poor start and replaced by Estevam Soares. The team remained near the relegation zone for most of the season but secured survival with a final-round win over title contenders Palmeiras.

=== The 2010s: A Decade of Ups and Downs ===
In 2010, Botafogo signed Uruguayan Loco Abreu, who was given the number 13 jersey by Zagallo, thrilling the fans. However, in the Carioca Championship, the team suffered a 6–0 defeat to Vasco da Gama in the third round of the Guanabara Cup, resulting in the dismissal of coach Estevam Soares. Joel Santana, who had previously led the team to a state title in 1997, returned and focused on rebuilding the squad's morale. With a decisive goal from young Caio, who would earn the nickname “talisman”, against Flamengo, Botafogo reached the final and defeated Vasco 2–0 to win the Guanabara Cup. In the Rio Cup, they beat Fluminense in the semi-finals and overcame Flamengo in the final with panenka penalties from Herrera and Abreu, and a crucial penalty save by Jefferson, clinching the state title.

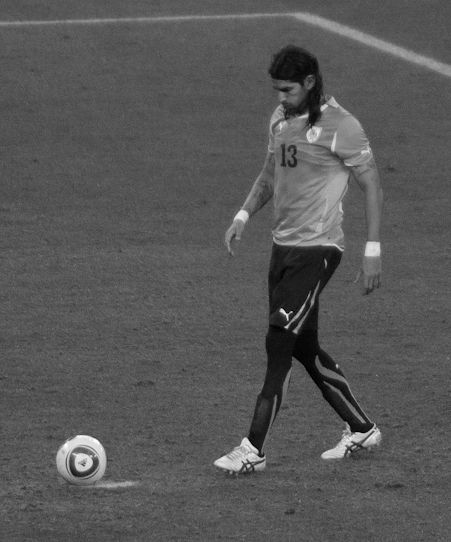
Hero of the 2010 state title, Loco Abreu revived Botafogo's World Cup traditions

In the Brazil Cup, the team was eliminated early by Santa Cruz in the second round. In the Brazilian Championship, after a poor start and time spent in the relegation zone, Botafogo climbed the table and came close to qualifying for the Libertadores, but a final-round loss to Grêmio ended those hopes. Highlights of the year included Jefferson's call-up to the Brazil national team—the first from Botafogo in 12 years—and Loco Abreu's appearance for Uruguay in the 2010 World Cup.

The 2011 season started poorly, leading to Joel's dismissal and the hiring of Caio Júnior. The team exited early from both the Carioca Championship and Brazil Cup. In the Brazilian Championship, however, Botafogo had a strong campaign, briefly contending for the title. The club prioritized the league, fielding reserves in the Sudamericana, where they were eliminated by Santa Fe of Colombia. A late-season collapse, including seven losses in nine matches, saw them finish in 9th place. Coach Caio Júnior was dismissed and replaced by Flávio Tênius for the final games, and several players were released following the disappointing end.

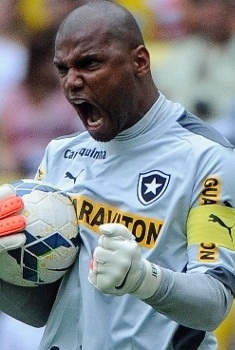
With 459 games for Botafogo, Jefferson is the third who most played with the team's jersey.

In 2012, Botafogo hired Oswaldo de Oliveira as the coach. Without Libertadores commitments, Botafogo focused on the Carioca Championship, finishing the Guanabara and Rio Cups undefeated. However, they lost both to Fluminense in the finals and suffered elimination from the Brazil Cup by Vitória.

In the Brazilian championship, the major signing of Dutch star Clarence Seedorf brought renewed hope. His arrival was met with enthusiasm, and although he debuted in a loss to Grêmio, he scored his first goal soon after. Botafogo finished the league in 7th place. In the Sudamericana, they were again eliminated early, this time by Palmeiras.

In 2013, Seedorf led the team to a Carioca Championship triumph, winning both the Guanabara and Rio Cups. Botafogo also started the Brazilian Championship well and led for six rounds. However, the sales of key players Fellype Gabriel and Vitinho, combined with salary delays, caused instability. They were knocked out of the Brazil Cup in the quarterfinals by Flamengo (4–0). Despite the issues, Botafogo finished 4th in the league, qualifying for the Libertadores after an 18-year absence.

In 2014, the club had its worst campaign in the Carioca Championship, finishing 9th. Despite passionate support in the Libertadores, they were eliminated in the group stage. In the Brazil Cup, they pulled off a dramatic 4–3 comeback against Ceará but were thrashed 5–0 by Santos in the next round. In the league, plagued by financial issues and a weak squad, Botafogo was relegated after a 2–0 loss to Santos in the 37th round.

In 2015, Botafogo won the Guanabara Cup but lost the state final to Vasco. They were eliminated by Figueirense at home in the Brazil Cup and parted ways with coach René Simões. Ricardo Gomes took over and led the team, despite challenges, to a Série B title and promotion back to the top flight. In 2016, they were again runners-up in the state championship (to Vasco), exited the Brazil Cup in the round of 16 against Cruzeiro, and began the national league in the relegation zone. After Gomes left for São Paulo, Jair Ventura took over and led the club to a 5th-place finish, securing Libertadores qualification.

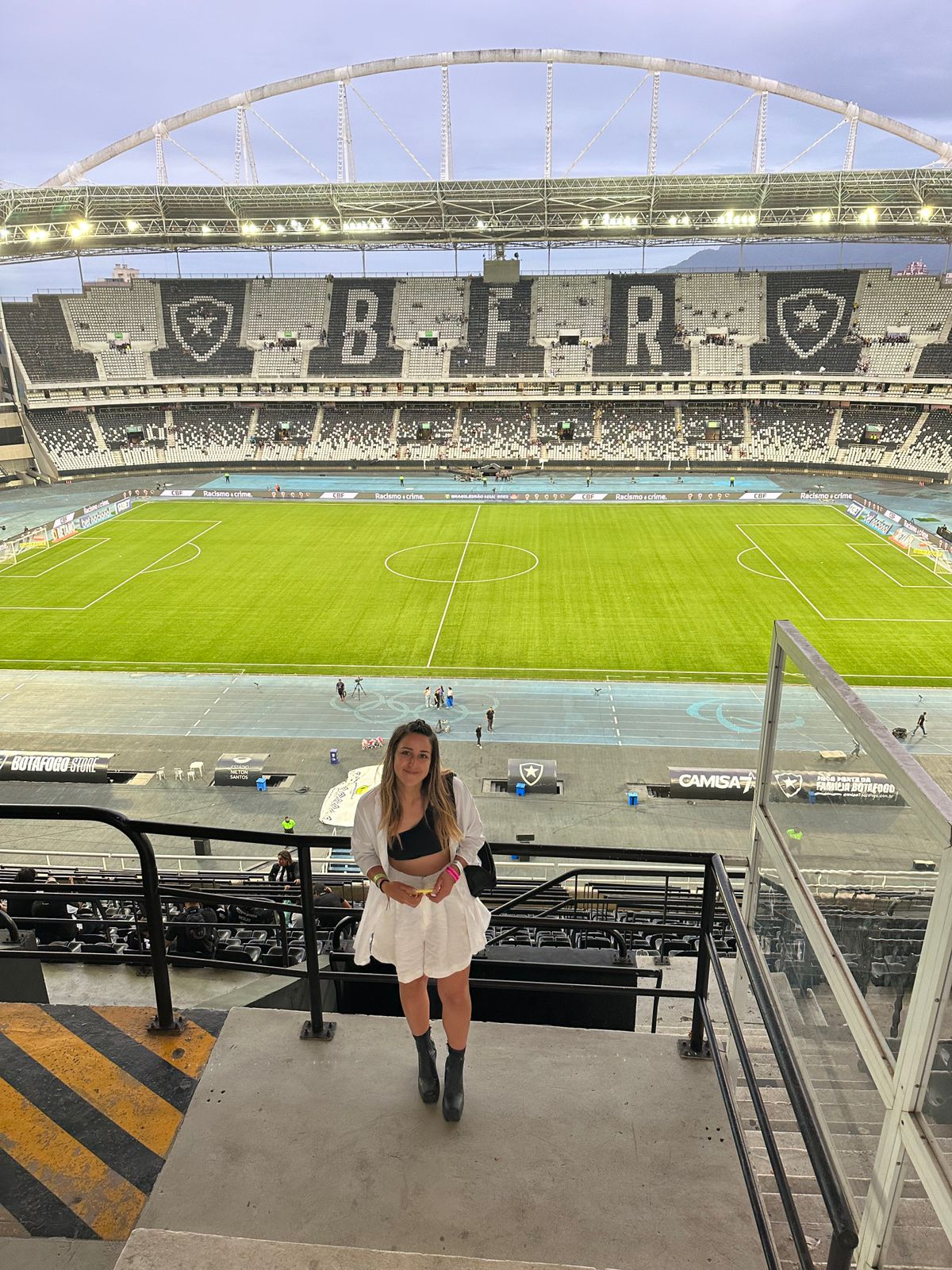
In 2017, the Olympic Stadium was officially renamed Nilton Santos Stadium and customized with Botafogo's colors.

In 2017, Botafogo began in the Libertadores qualifiers, eliminating Colo-Colo and Olimpia—thanks to three penalty saves by Gatito Fernández—to reach the group stage. With a rotated squad, they failed to advance in the Guanabara Cup but finished runner-up in the Rio Cup. In the Libertadores, Botafogo topped their group ahead of Barcelona de Guayaquil, Estudiantes, and defending champions Atlético Nacional.

They eliminated Nacional in the round of 16 but fell to eventual champions Grêmio in the quarterfinals. Despite the exit, Botafogo set a record by eliminating five past Libertadores champions in a single edition. In the league, after 14 rounds in the Libertadores zone, they finished 10th.

In 2018, the season began in crisis. With Jair Ventura leaving for Santos, the club promoted assistant Felipe Conceição, but he was soon dismissed after early eliminations from the Guanabara Cup and Brazil Cup. Under Alberto Valentim, the team improved and won the state title after beating Flamengo in the semi-final and Vasco in the final. Joel Carli scored the decisive goal, and Gatito Fernández saved two penalties to seal the title.

Valentim departed mid-year, and after a short-lived tenure by Marcos Paquetá, Zé Ricardo took over. Botafogo reached the Sudamericana round of 16 (eliminated by Bahia) and finished 9th in the league. The season also marked Jefferson's retirement, ending a legendary career with 459 appearances.

In 2019, Botafogo endured a poor season. They failed to advance in the Carioca rounds, exited the Brazil Cup in the third round to Juventude, and were eliminated by Atlético Mineiro. in the Sudamericana. In the league, they hovered around mid-table and avoided relegation late, finishing 15th. The season was marred by internal turmoil, including player protests, controversial management statements, and financial instability. The club remained afloat with the support of loans from influential fans.

=== 2020's ===
After years of instability, the 2020 season began with high expectations for the launch of "Botafogo S/A"—a project aimed at attracting investors and professionalizing the club's football department. However, the initiative never moved beyond the planning stage. What followed was one of the most chaotic seasons in the club's history, exposing the full extent of Botafogo's financial, political, and sporting crises.

In a year heavily impacted by the COVID-19 pandemic—which halted Brazilian football for nearly three months and forced matches to be played without fans—supporters celebrated the high-profile signings of Japanese star Keisuke Honda and the Ivorian Salomon Kalou. However, neither player made a significant impact, and the team's overall performance remained poor. Throughout the season, Botafogo cycled through eight head coaches—including Argentine Ramón Díaz, who was appointed but never made his debut—along with three interim managers. The instability was reflected in the results: a 5th-place finish in the Campeonato Carioca, a round-of-16 exit in the Copa do Brasil to Cuiabá, and the club's worst-ever points tally in the Série A era. Botafogo was relegated for the third time, finishing with the fourth-worst campaign in the league's modern format.

In the 2021 season, Botafogo hired Marcelo Chamusca as the coach. Botafogo placed 6th in the state championship and was eliminated in the second round of the Copa do Brasil by ABC. Despite these setbacks, Chamusca remained in charge at the start of the Série B campaign. However, continued inconsistency led to his dismissal after ten rounds. He was replaced by Enderson Moreira. Under Moreira, and with a new leadership structure that included football director Eduardo Freeland and CEO Jorge Braga, the club began to show signs of recovery. With standout performances from players such as Chay and Rafael Navarro, Botafogo gained momentum and asserted itself in the competition. The club secured promotion with one round to spare and was crowned Série B champions for the second time. The 2021 edition was widely considered one of the toughest in history, featuring traditional powerhouses like Cruzeiro and Vasco da Gama.

== Basketball ==
=== 1930s and 1940s: First titles and merger ===
In the 1930s, Botafogo Football Club dominated the Metropolitan Basketball Association (AMB), winning all editions of the Carioca Championship from 1933 to 1937. By the end of the decade, the club joined the Rio de Janeiro State Basketball Federation (FBERJ), then called the Carioca Basketball League, and won the 1939 championship. Meanwhile, Club de Regatas Botafogo had previously competed in FBERJ tournaments, finishing as runner-up in 1934 and 1937. Notably, FBERJ does not recognize AMB championships as official.

In the early 1940s, a tragic event led to the merger of the two Botafogo clubs. During a Carioca Championship match, Armando Albano, a leading scorer for Botafogo Football Club and the Brazilian National Team, collapsed from heart failure and died shortly after. The incident prompted the presidents of both clubs—Eduardo Góis Trindade (football) and Augusto Frederico Schmidt (rowing)—to unite the institutions, forming Botafogo de Futebol e Regatas on 8 December 1942.

That same year, Botafogo Football Club won the state championship. Botafogo de Futebol e Regatas continued this success, winning consecutive titles in 1943, 1944, and 1945, and again in 1947, establishing regional dominance.

=== 1950s and 1960s: National pioneer ===
The first Carioca Women's Basketball Championship took place in 1952, and Botafogo secured its first women's state title in 1955. The team was runner-up in 1956 and 1959.

In the 1950s, the club's achievements came through the women's team, but the 1960s brought success for both men and women. The women's team, led by Martha, won the state championship in 1960, 1961, 1962, and 1963. The men's team won three consecutive Carioca Championships from 1966 to 1968. In 1967, Botafogo became the first Rio de Janeiro club to win the national basketball championship by claiming the Brazil Cup, then the country's premier competition. The final, held at the Club Municipal gymnasium, saw Botafogo overcome an early deficit against reigning champions Corinthians to win 85–84, with decisive plays from Raimundo, top scorer César (23 points), and a missed free throw by Amaury.

This victory earned Botafogo a place in the 1967 Sudamericano Championship in Chile, where the club finished third. The same year, Botafogo was selected to represent South America in the 1968 FIBA Intercontinental Cup in the United States, after the planned continental tournament was canceled. The team finished fourth, losing to the Akron Wingfoots in the semi-final and Olimpia Milano in the third-place match.

=== 1990s and 2000s: Resurgence and crisis ===
After two decades without titles—the best result being a runner-up finish in the 1973 Carioca Championship—Botafogo returned to form in the 1990s. In 1991, the club won the state championship by defeating Flamengo in both final matches. The women's team claimed the title in 1995, also eliminating Flamengo in the semi-final.

In 1999 and 2000, Botafogo reached consecutive state finals with a star-studded squad but lost to Flamengo and Vasco, respectively. In the 2001 National Championship, the club eliminated Fluminense in the quarterfinals but fell to COC/Ribeirão Preto. Despite promising campaigns, the professional men's basketball department was shut down in 2002. The women's team won another state title in 2006.

=== 2010s: Debut in the NBB and continental title ===
In 2012, Botafogo returned to the Carioca Championship with an amateur team, resuming professional competition in 2015. Despite limited investment, the club placed third in the state championship. That same year, the women's team was disbanded.

In 2016, Botafogo competed in the state championship and the Super Cup Brazil (third division), but was eliminated early in both tournaments.

The following year, the club played in the Golden League (second division) and won the title by defeating Joinville/AABJ in the final. American point guard Jamaal Smith, a late signing, was named MVP of the regular season and playoffs. The victory secured Botafogo's promotion to the Novo Basquete Brasil (NBB).

Botafogo debuted in the NBB on 16 November 2017 against Pinheiros and earned its first victory in the next match against Liga Sorocabana. The team qualified for the playoffs in 12th place but was eliminated in the first round by Caxias do Sul.

In the 2018–19 season, coach Léo Figueiró was appointed, and key players such as Coelho, Arthur, Ansaloni, Murilo Becker, and Cauê Borges joined the team. Botafogo reached the final of the Carioca Championship for the first time in 18 years but lost to Flamengo.

During NBB 11, the club reached the Super 8 Cup semi-finals and finished the regular season in 6th place. In the playoffs, Botafogo defeated São José 2–0 and won a hard-fought series against Pinheiros 3–2 to reach the semifinals, where it was eliminated by Flamengo. The 4th place finish earned the club a spot in the Liga Sudamericana.

In their first international appearance since their return to professional basketball, Botafogo recovered from an initial loss to Salta Basket (Argentina) with wins over Nacional (Uruguay) and San Andrés (Colombia). The team advanced to the final after a dramatic semi-final round, which included a last-second win against Salta and a historic comeback against Ciclista Olímpico, from Argentina. In the final against Corinthians, Botafogo lost the first game at home but rebounded to win the next two, securing the 2019 Liga Sudamericana title—its first international trophy. Jamaal Smith and Cauê Borges were standout performers, with Borges named Finals MVP.

=== 2020s ===
Despite winning the most important title in its history, Botafogo basketball entered 2020 in financial crisis. By February, players and coaching staff had gone three months without pay, though a sponsorship deal with Ambev was expected to ease the situation. By April, amid the COVID-19 pandemic, the salary backlog had grown to four months, and the NBB 12 season was canceled without playoffs or a champion. Based on first-round standings, Botafogo finished in 8th place and qualified for the Champions League Americas due to its 2019 Liga Sudamericana title.

Even with Ambev's support via the Sports Incentive Law, the team suffered a major setback when main sponsor TIM redirected funds to cultural projects. Key departures followed, including player Cauê Borges and Olympic sports directors Gláucio Cruz and Alexandre Brito. On 30 July 2020, coach Léo Figueiró announced the end of the basketball project, and the club withdrew from both the NBB and Champions League Americas.

In November 2020, part-owner Carlos Salomão took over as basketball director and reformed the team to compete in the Brazilian Club Championship, the second tier of national basketball. Botafogo reached the semi-finals but was eliminated by eventual champions União Corinthians, failing to secure promotion back to the NBB.

== Swimming ==
=== 1890s to 1900s: The federation emerges ===
Botafogo is one of Brazil's most traditional swimming clubs. In Rio de Janeiro, the sport gained popularity in the 1850s, becoming associated with modernity and civility. On 31 July 1897, Botafogo became one of the founding members of the Metropolitan Swimming Federation, now the Aquatic Federation of the State of Rio de Janeiro (FARJ).

=== 1960s and 1970s: Golden Age ===
Botafogo won the Brazil Swimming Trophy for the first time in 1967. That year, swimmer José Sylvio Fiolo earned two golds (100 m and 200 m breaststroke) and a bronze (4 × 100 m medley relay) at the Pan American Games in Winnipeg, and in 1968, he broke the world record in the 100 m breaststroke.

During the 1970s, Botafogo was a national powerhouse, claiming four consecutive Brazilian Swimming Trophy titles (1971–1974) and four José Finkel Trophy titles (1972–1975).

=== Years 2000 and 2010: Statewide prominence ===
In the early 21st century, Botafogo achieved state-level success across various categories, becoming two-time Rio de Janeiro adult champion in 2005 and 2006. In 2010, it ranked 5th in the Brazilian Club Ranking and secured its sixth State Efficiency Trophy. In 2011, Larissa Simões won gold in the 200 m breaststroke at the South American Youth Championships.

=== The 1910s and 1920s: The Beginning ===
Water polo began in Rio in the early 20th century, played in open waters such as Botafogo Cove. The sport gained popularity in several clubs, including Botafogo.

=== 1940s to 1960s: First titles ===
Botafogo won its first Carioca Championship in 1942—also the last title for Club de Regatas Botafogo before the club merger. Further state titles followed in 1944, 1947, 1949, 1963, 1965, and 1966.

=== 1980s and 1990s: National success ===
Botafogo secured state championships in 1980, 1982, 1983, 1995, and 1996. It also achieved national success, winning the Brazilian Championship (then João Havelange Trophy) in 1995 and 1996.

=== The 2000s and 2010s: The Beginning of Sovereignty ===
In the 21st century, Botafogo claimed the Carioca Championship titles in 2005, 2006, 2009, and 2010. Nationally, it won the League in 2015 and the Brazil Trophy in 2016.

The club entered women's competitions in 2009, earning three bronze medals and one runner-up finish in the Olga Pinciroli Trophy. In 2014, Botafogo signed American star Brenda Villa, a four-time Olympic medalist and three-time world champion.

The men's team won the inaugural South American Club League and the National Super League in 2016, contributing six players to Brazil's Olympic team, which finished 8th. In 2017, Botafogo secured another South American Club Championship.

== Rowing ==
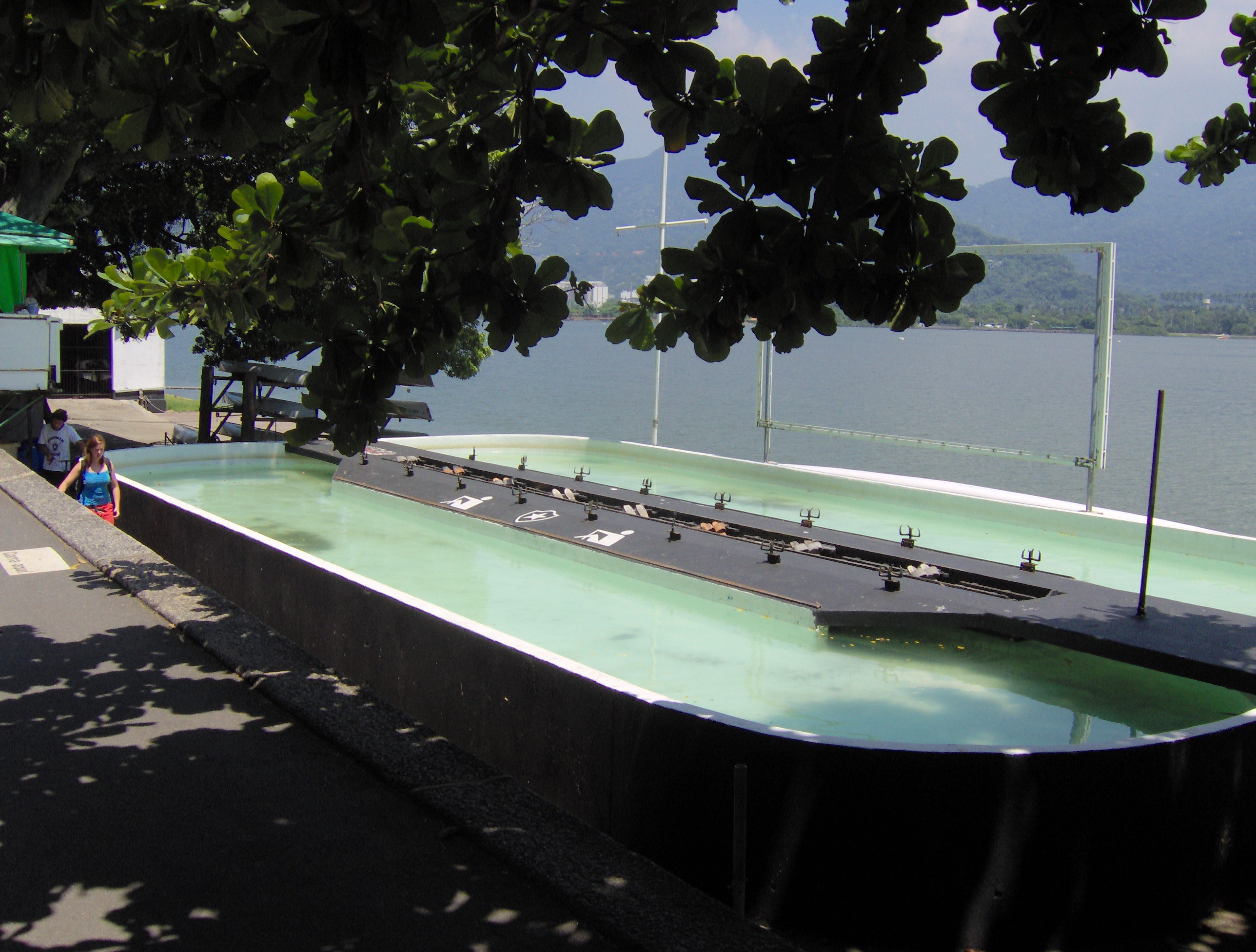
Boat for rowing training at the club's nautical headquarters.

Based at one of the postcards of Rio de Janeiro, the Botafogo rowing club was founded in 1891 under the name Grupo de Regatas Botafogo. However, soon after, the club had to shut down its activities, returning three years later as Club de Regatas Botafogo. It is one of the main sports in the club's history, next to football. It came from there the greatest revelation of national rowing: Antônio Mendes de Oliveira, the Brazilian champion in 1902. In 1924, Antônio became president of Botafogo. Today, they count with prominent athletes such as Aílson Eráclito da Silva, Célio Dias Amorim, Armando Marx, Anderson Nocetti, Diego Nazário, Bianca Miarka, and Marciel Morais. The club's rowing is also a highlight in the Paralympics with Isaac Ribeiro, who became a three-time Brazilian champion and participated in the World Cup in Slovenia as well as the London Paralympics.

== Volleyball ==
=== 1930s to 1950s: Successful Start ===
Botafogo was a pioneer in Rio de Janeiro volleyball, winning the first five editions of the Men's Carioca Championship (1938–1942), and again in 1945, 1946, and 1950. In the Women's Championship, the club claimed titles in 1939, 1940, and from 1946 to 1950.

=== 1960s and 1970s: South American trio and four-time Brazilian champion ===
After a 12-year title drought, Botafogo won the Men's Carioca Championship in 1962, followed by 13 more titles by 1979, including 11 consecutive wins. Led by figures such as Ary Graça, Bebeto de Freitas, Carlos Arthur Nuzman, and Mario Dunlop, the club won the South American Championship in 1971, 1972, and 1977, and claimed four national titles: three Brazilian Cups (1971, 1972, 1975) and the 1976 Brazilian Super League. Between 1965 and 1978, the club won over 30 titles. The women's team won the state title in 1964.

=== 1980s and 1990s: Decline ===
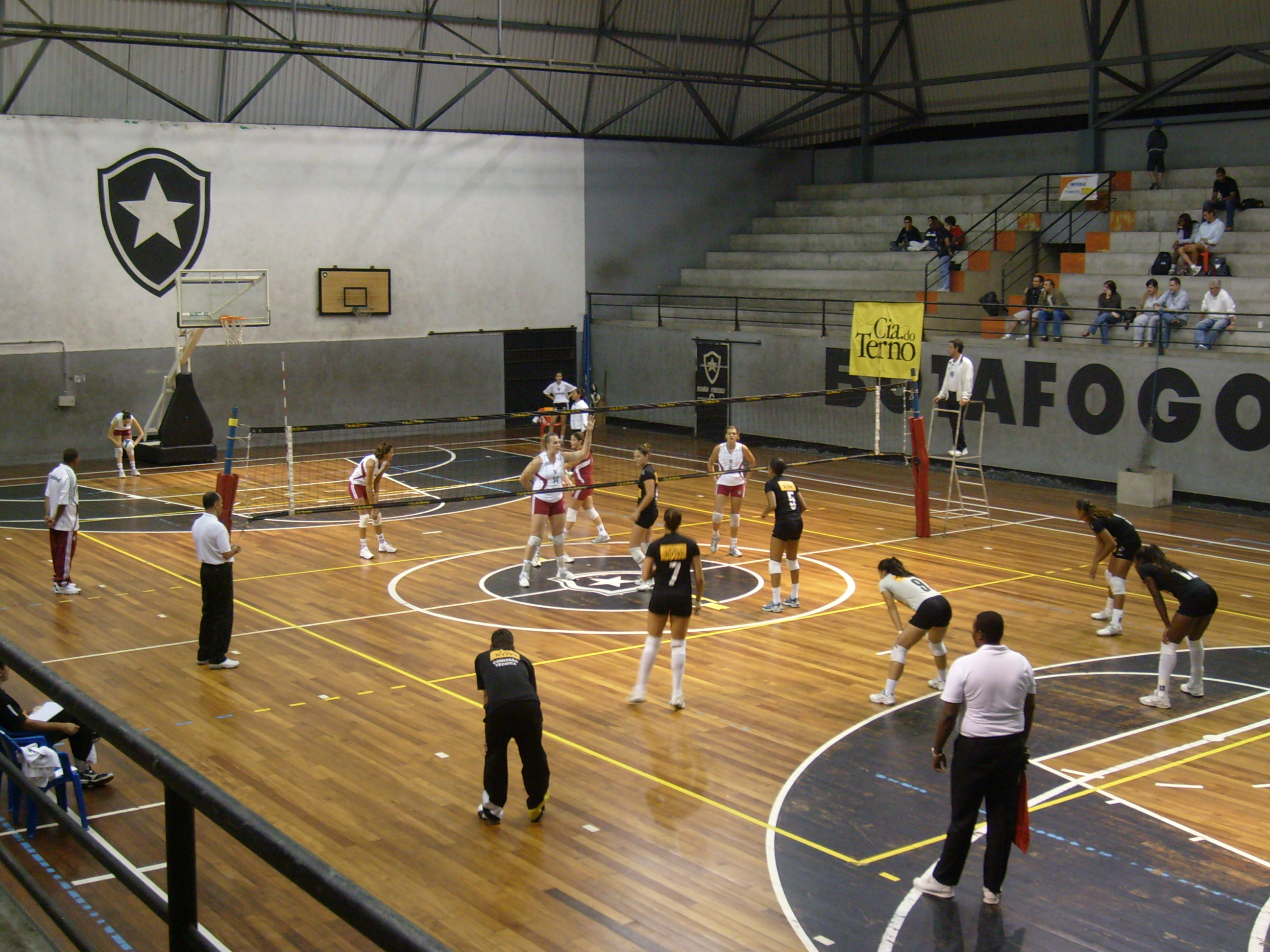
2008 Women's Carioca Championship Semi-final between Botafogo and Fluminense

Following its peak, Botafogo gradually reduced its volleyball activities. The men's team last played a national tournament in 1984, finishing 5th in the Brazil Cup. The women's team won the state title in 1995 and competed in the Brazilian Super League, finishing 9th.

=== Years 2000 and 2010: Return to the top canceled ===
In 2007, Botafogo won the Men's Carioca Championship, its first title in 28 years. The club returned to national competition in 2013, finishing third in the Supercopa. In 2015, it won the Rio Cup and qualified for the 2016 Superliga B but was eliminated in the semi-finals. Despite repeated attempts in 2017 and 2018, the club failed to gain promotion.

Promotion finally came in 2019: Botafogo dominated Superliga B, won the title, and returned to the top division after 35 years. However, due to financial difficulties, the professional team was disbanded before the start of the Superliga season. Star player Lorena publicly criticized the club's management, highlighting the abrupt dissolution and unfulfilled promises regarding funding and team commitments.
