= Juan Castillo (footballer, born 1978) =

Uruguayan footballer

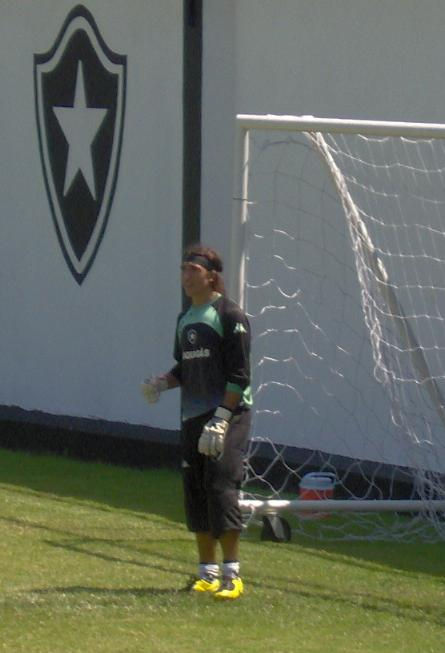
- Castillo training with Botafogo in 2008

Personal information
- Full name: Juan Guillermo Castillo Iriart
- Date of birth: 17 April 1978 (age 48)
- Place of birth: Montevideo, Uruguay
- Height: 1.82 m (6 ft 0 in)
- Position: Goalkeeper

Team information
- Current team: Rampla Juniors (goalkeeping coach)

Youth career
- 1989–1998: Santa Bernardina

Senior career*
Years	Team	Apps	(Gls)
1999–2006	Defensor Sporting	122	(0)
2001	→ Huracán Buceo (loan)	30	(0)
2006–2007	Peñarol	38	(0)
2008–2009	Botafogo	39	(0)
2010	Deportivo Cali	31	(0)
2011	Colo-Colo	30	(0)
2012	Liverpool	15	(0)
2012–2013	Querétaro	12	(0)
2013	Danubio	13	(0)
2013–2014	Peñarol	22	(0)
2014	Deportivo Pasto	16	(0)
2015–2016	Patriotas	42	(0)
2017	Juventud	22	(0)
2018	Fénix	3	(0)
Total		435	(0)

International career
2007–2011	Uruguay	13	(0)

Managerial career
- 2024: Rampla Juniors (interim)
Medal record
Representing Uruguay
Copa América
Winner	2011 Argentina	Team
- * Club domestic league appearances and goals

Juan Guillermo Castillo Iriart (born 17 April 1978) is a Uruguayan football coach and former player who played as a goalkeeper. He is the current goalkeeping coach of Rampla Juniors.

Castillo began his career with the Defensor Sporting youth team and made his Uruguayan Primera División debut in the 1999 season. He was loaned to Huracán Buceo in 2001. However, he soon moved on to Peñarol and made his debut in 2006. After a good spell with Peñarol, two years later in 2008, he joined to Brazilian Série A side Botafogo. In December 2009, he was released of the club and then he moved to Colombian side Deportivo Cali, in where he remained one season, winning the 2010 Copa Colombia. In the next season, he abandoned the club for high costs and then signed a one–season deal with Colo-Colo for play the national tournament and the 2011 Copa Libertadores. However, he had a very regular season and was sacked of the club in December. On 16 February 2012, he joined to Liverpool de Montevideo in the transfer deadline day of the South American football.

At international level, Castillo played for the Uruguay national team since 2007. He made senior debut in 2008, and has generally been selected as the second-choice keeper behind Fernando Muslera. He was part of the Uruguay squad for the 2010 World Cup and one year later, he won the 2011 Copa América, earning him his first international honour, despite not making an appearance in the competition.?

== Club career ==
=== Early career ===
Castillo began his football career at the local amateur club Santa Bernardina of his natal city Durazno, in where he played in the youth ranks of the team during 1989 to 1997. In 1998, he joined as youth player to Defensor Sporting. In 2001, he was loaned to Huracán Buceo, returning to Defensor the next season. At Defensor, Castillo remained until 2006, playing more than of 100 games for the club.

After good performances in his former club, he moved to most successful club of Uruguay, Peñarol in mid-2006. After a very good spell in the club, for example his nomination to the national team squad for the 2007 Copa América celebrated in Venezuela, among his achievements, in December 2007, was confirmed his move to Brazilian side Botafogo. Castillo signed a two-year contract with the club of Rio de Janeiro that will keep at the team until 2010.

=== Botafogo ===
Castillo joined Botafogo on 2 January 2008 for an undisclosed sum and presented on 6 January. He played in every game that Botafogo won during their success in the Copa Peregrino, against Stabæk and Viking. He helped the club to win the friendly tournament, not conceding goals in the two matches that the club disputed. Thanks for his performances on 22 January 2008, was nominated to the Uruguay national team by Oscar Tabárez for a friendly against Colombia on 6 February.

Castillo become of good form the Campeonato Carioca, saving a penalty to Victor Hugo of Friburguense in the 4–1 win of Botafogo, in the first official game of "The wall" for that tournament. Due to his good performances for the Carioca against Flamengo and Fluminense, the biggest rivals of Botafogo, he came to be idolized by the club's fans. In April 2008, he won the Taça Rio, after a 1–0 victory over Fluminense with a goal of Renato Silva in the 84th minute, being this his first title in an international league. However, after the success of Botafogo, his club was eliminated of the Copa do Brasil by Corinthians and the Uruguayan keeper lost his reputation among the fans of the club, due to mistakes that he committed in the second game of the semifinals key. After of this bad moment of the player, was relegated as second choice goalkeeper of Botafogo, being the first keeper Renan, who was contesting the post with Castillo weeks ago.

On 10 May 2008, he made his league debut for Botafogo against Cruzeiro for the second week of the Campeonato Brasileirão, in where the club suffered a 1–0 away defeat at Mineirão Stadium with a goal of Guilherme in the 11th minute. Castillo kept his first clean sheet for Botafogo on his fourth league game against Fluminense in a 0–0 home draw. On 9 October, he suffered a serious knee injury after a match played against Vitória.

Castillo began the 2009 season in winning form with Botafogo, beating Resende in the Taça Guanabara final at Maracanã. The match finished in a 3–0 victory of his team with goals of Reinaldo, Maicosuel and Lucas Silva. He started the Brasileirão's third week away to Grêmio, which ended in a 2–0 loss. Of this form he returned to the titularity in Botafogo's goal after of challenge the post with Renan during weeks ago, receiving also a call-up from his national team for dispute the 2010 World Cup Qualifiers against Brazil and Venezuela.

He started several games consecutive with the coach Ney Franco until his dismissal, but with the arrival of Estevam Soares he preferred to Jéferson in the goal and Castillo again was relegated to the bench. After matchdays in the bench and without add minutes in the field, Botafogo declared that the keeper was put on the transfer list. Months later of this new, the keeper was released of the club and Castillo said that Botafogo lacked respect.

=== Deportivo Cali ===
On 18 December 2009, Castillo had reached an agreement with the Colombian Primera División side Deportivo Cali, putting pen to paper on a one-year deal. On 21 December, the player presented as new keeper of the club during a press conference. His competitive debut came against Deportes Tolima in a 3–1 loss where Jorge Perlaza's netted a hat-trick. However, the next game Castillo had a better performance against Millonarios which Cali won 4–1 and then began to reach a well level that allowed him be nominated in the 23-man Uruguayan squad to face the 2010 FIFA World Cup at South Africa.

Following Uruguay's successful World Cup where they finished in the fourth place, Castillo returned to Cali to face the Torneo Finalización where Los Azucareros failed to qualify the playoffs to contest the league title. No doubt, the Uruguayan was a key player in obtaining the Copa Colombia title. In the cup final Cali defeat 2–0 to Itagüí Ditaires to earn for first time in the club's history that trophy after failing to win it in 1962, 1963 and 1981.

In December 2010, was reported that Castillo wouldn't renew his contract and following New year celebrations he left Cali's team despite his desire to continue.

=== Colo-Colo ===
==== Torneo Apertura ====
After the transfer saga of Argentina's Tigre keeper, Daniel Islas, on 7 January 2011, was officially announced that Castillo signed a two-year contract with Colo-Colo. In his arrival he was assigned with the kit number 1, previously worn by Francisco Prieto, the club's 2010 first choice keeper marginated by coach Diego Cagna to face the season. At Chilean club, Castillo was reunited with his national team teammate Andrés Scotti and on 9 January joined the club's pre-season in La Serena alongside Colo-Colo's another signing Agustín Alayes where he declared: "It's a joy arrive to the most successful team of Chile", finally adding: "I'll defend this team with much sacrifice and pride". Castillo made his friendly debut against Deportes La Serena in a 1–0 loss with a score of Javier Vatter in the 75th minute. After their stay in La Serena, Colo-Colo continued the pre-season at Santiago and in the following match against Unión Española he stopped a penalty to Sebastián Jaime in a game that finally Colo-Colo won 3–1. On 26 January, during the Noche Alba (Colo-Colo's last pre-season game where presents their signings) he produced a man of the match performance in a 3–2 defeat to Nacional, so that won the recognition from the press and the fans despite the loss.

On 30 January 2011, he officially debuted in a 2–2 home draw with Cobresal receiving goals from Víctor Osorio and Héctor Pericás. However, on 3 February, Castillo suffered a two weeks injury which he missed the Torneo Apertura second matchday game against Santiago Wanderers that Colo-Colo lost 2–1 with Raúl Olivares in the goal. Not obstant, in his return to Colo-Colo's goal on 18 February he had a poor performance in a 5–1 home loss to Universidad de Concepción that meant the biggest home defeat in the club's history and the worst start of championship since 1989 selling Cagna's firing.

Following Cagna's departure arrived 1991 Copa Libertadores champion Luis Pérez as caretaker, who remained Castillo in the goal. However, despite Pérez's trust in the keeper, he again completed a poor performance and conceded five goals in the Copa Libertadores debut that Colo-Colo lost 5–2 with Cerro Porteño. On 20 February the crisis deepened with Castillo yet on goal after a 2–0 away loss with Unión San Felipe for the local tournament. Finally Colo-Colo won 3–0 to Palestino during Pérez's last caretaking match where Castillo had casual crash with Arab team striker Nicolás Canales which the Uruguayan publicly apologized him in front of the press and then via Twitter. Shortly after Colo-Colo appointed Américo Gallego as club's new coach.

On 2 March 2011, Castillo played in Gallego's first match in the bench that Colo-Colo won 4–2 to Venezuelan Deportivo Táchira for the Libertadores where receive a twice of the Chilean Julio Gutiérrez. The club continued his rise after winning 2–1 to Unión Española at Santa Laura on 6 March where his performance was marred after receiving a 20-yard goal of Kevin Harbottle who chipped Castillo. Ten days later on 16 March for Colo-Colo's third game Libertadores, Castillo played in Colo-Colo's 3–2 home win over Santos at Estadio Monumental which suffered a 35-yard free kick goal of Elano in the 4th minute and forty-four minutes later in the 48th minute Neymar eluded the Uruguayan to score the second goal for the São Paulo state-based outfit in a game which Esteban Paredes, Ezequiel Miralles and Andrés Scotti scored for the home. After the continental game Castillo played in a 1–1 draw with Cobreloa that contemplated goals of Paredes for the home and an own-goal of Daúd Gazale to the visitors. However, Gallego then relegated Castillo to the bench following Prieto's well performance against Huachipato so that Castillo began to challenge the keeper position with Prieto after a rise status of the last. Following the Uruguayan's relegation, he returned in the 2–1 Libertadores win over Táchira for then play in the derby against Universidad Católica on 20 April which was 1–1 draw where receive another free-kick goal, now from Juan Eluchans. However, Castillo was chosen by Gallego to play the Superclásico against Universidad de Chile after an acceptable match in the prior 1–0 win to Santiago Morning at Estadio Nacional, same stadium where would play the Chilean most important derby and the prior elimination of Colo-Colo in the Libertadores after loss 3–2 as home against Cerro Porteño where played Prieto and receive a 27-yard free kick winning goal of Jonathan Fabbro in the 88th minute when Colo-Colo drawing qualify to knockout stage. Finally on 30 April during the derby, Colo-Colo freshly opened the score the 64th minute with Miralles' score but The Owls sorted it during the last three minutes with a penalty goal of Gustavo Canales nearly saved by Castillo in the 87th minute and two minutes later after Diego Rivarola's header that sneaked up in the Uruguayan's second post to put the final victory.

However, after playing as home beating 5–1 to O'Higgins, drawing 1–1 with Deportes Iquique to finally defeat Ñublense as visitor 3–2 in Chillán that allowed Macul based-side qualify the playoffs in the 8th place (last position to qualify) where Castillo play all this games only being replaced by Raúl Olivares against O'Higgins in the 73rd minute. Not obstant Colo-Colo was eliminated by Católica in the quarterfinals after loss 4–2 at Monumental and a 1–1 draw at Estadio Nacional of which Castillo played both. On 18 June, once finished the Apertura was reported that Gallego would studying the possibility of Castillo's disappointing of the club to use his foreign bid in a midfielder to face the Torneo Clausura. On 28 June, was announced the 23-man Copa América squad where Castillo and his teammate Scotti were nominated by coach Oscar Washington Tabarez.

==== Torneo Clausura ====
Castillo left the club in December.

=== Liverpool ===
On 16 February 2012, he signed a six-month deal with the Uruguayan side Liverpool de Montevideo. He played a total of 15 matches and became an outstanding player for the club to achieve the qualification to the 2012 Copa Sudamericana.

=== Querétaro ===
On 21 June 2012, he signed a three-year contract with Mexican Primera División side Queretaro. He made his debut for the club on 21 July 2012 against Club León.

== International career ==
Castillo's first appearance for Uruguay was in a friendly match against South Africa, in a game that finished without goals. His second game for Uruguay was in a 2–2 draw with Colombia, replacing to Fabián Carini in the second half of the match. After his second presentation for his country, Castillo started in eight games of World Cup qualification, making his debut in a 6–0 win over Peru.

In June 2010, Castillo was named in the 23-man squad of Uruguay for the 2010 FIFA World Cup in South Africa as the second choice goalkeeper behind Fernando Muslera and before Martín Silva. Despite spending the entire tournament on the bench, Uruguay finished fourth in the tournament, their best finish since 1970. He played 90 minutes in a friendly against Indonesia at the Gelora Bung Karno Stadium on 8 October 2010, in which Uruguay won 7–1 despite being conceded first by Boaz Solossa.

The next year, he was called up to the squad for the Copa América, having the same role during the World Cup. Uruguay won the record 15th Copa title, and shortly after Castillo retired from the national team. His last cap was earned in a 2–0 friendly loss to Estonia at the A. Le Coq Arena on 25 March 2011.

== Honours ==
Botafogo

- Copa Peregrino: 2008
- Taça Rio: 2008
- Taça Guanabara: 2009

Deportivo Cali

- Copa Colombia: 2010

Uruguay

- Copa América: 2011
