= Víctor Etchegaray =

Brazilian footballer (1878–1915)

Personal information
- Full name: Víctor François Etchegaray
- Date of birth: 7 April 1878
- Place of birth: Argentina
- Date of death: 13 July 1915 (aged 37)
- Place of death: Rio de Janeiro, Brazil
- Position: Defender

Senior career*
Years	Team	Apps	(Gls)
1902–1912	Fluminense	85	(9)
- * Club domestic league appearances and goals as of 3 February 2024

Víctor François Etchegaray (7 April 1878 – 13 July 1915) was an Argentine footballer who played as a defender.

== Career ==
Coming from Argentina with his brother Emile, Víctor Etchegaray was one of the founders of Fluminense FC, in 1902. He participated in winning the first four titles of the Campeonato Carioca.

Regarded as an elegant and distinguished defender, he was captain of the club and frequently asked to referee matches for other clubs in the league, a practice that was common practice at the time. He was also an athlete, being the first champion of the sport for Fluminense, winning the 100 yard race at an event celebrating the coronation of George V.

== Death ==
Etchegaray died on 13 July 1915, at age of 37, victim of tuberculosis.

== Honours ==
Fluminense

- Campeonato Carioca: 1906, 1907, 1908, 1909
