= Emile Etchegaray =

Brazilian footballer

Personal information
- Full name: Emile Pierre Narcise Etchegaray
- Date of birth: 13 September 1879
- Place of birth: Argentina
- Date of death: 1941 (aged 61–62)
- Place of death: Santa María, Argentina
- Position: Forward

Senior career*
Years	Team	Apps	(Gls)
1903–1910	Fluminense	76	(51)
- * Club domestic league appearances and goals as of 3 February 2024

Emile Etchegaray (13 September 1879 – 1941), was an Argentine footballer who played as a forward.

== Career ==
Coming from Argentina with his brother Víctor, Emile Etchegaray made history for Fluminense, participating in the first four titles of the Campeonato Carioca, being top scorer in the 1908 edition alongside Edwin Cox. He made 76 appearances for the club and scored 51 goals, 44 of which were at the Estádio das Laranjeiras, making him the stadium's all-time top scorer.

== Honours ==
Fluminense

- Campeonato Carioca: 1906, 1907, 1908, 1909
