= Gilbert Hime =

Brazilian footballer (1887–1957)

Personal information
- Full name: Gilbert Leon Hime
- Date of birth: 2 November 1887
- Place of birth: Rio de Janeiro, Brazil
- Date of death: 15 August 1957 (aged 69)
- Place of death: Rio de Janeiro, Brazil
- Position: Forward

Senior career*
Years	Team	Apps	(Gls)
1906–1909	Botafogo	33	(22)
1910–1913	Fluminense	11	(6)
- * Club domestic league appearances and goals as of 3 February 2024

Gilbert Leon Hime (2 November 1887 – 15 August 1957) was a Brazilian footballer who played as a forward.

== Career ==
Hime began his career at Botafogo, and in 1906 he was the club's top scorer in the first edition of the Campeonato Carioca. He played for the club until 1909, even though he had to combine the matches with his work out the football, often acting for the reserve teams instead of the main teams. In 1910 he transferred to Fluminense, where he played until 1913.

Hime was also the author of a historic record in Brazilian football, when he scored 9 goals in the same game, in the match 24–0 against Sport Club Mangueira, which took place on 30 May 1909. The record was only surpassed by Dario on 6 April 1976, when he scored 10 goals in the Sport Recife 14–0 Santo Amaro match.

== Honours ==
Botafogo

- Campeonato Carioca: 1907

== See also ==
- History of Botafogo de Futebol e Regatas
- Football records and statistics in Brazil
