= Flávio Ramos (footballer, born 1889) =

Brazilian footballer

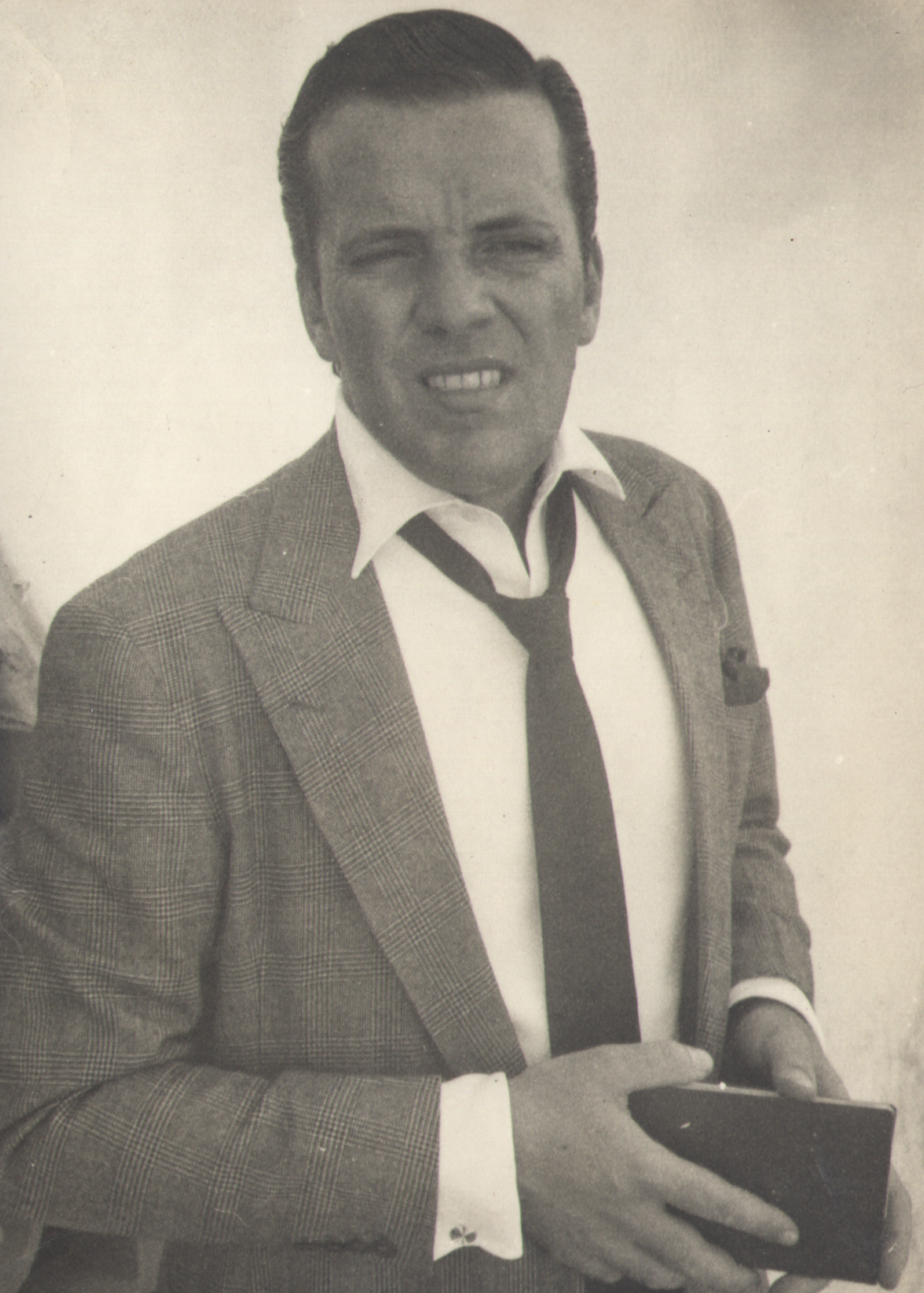
- Ramos as president of Botafogo FR

Personal information
- Full name: Flávio da Silva Ramos
- Date of birth: 14 April 1889
- Place of birth: Rio de Janeiro, Brazil
- Date of death: 14 September 1967 (aged 78)
- Place of death: Rio de Janeiro, Brazil
- Position: Forward

Senior career*
Years	Team	Apps	(Gls)
1904–1913	Botafogo	58	(58)
- * Club domestic league appearances and goals as of 2 February 2024

Flávio Ramos (14 April 1889 – 14 September 1967), was a Brazilian footballer who played as a forward.

== Career ==
Flávio Ramos was a player, member #1, first president and first goal scorer in the history of Botafogo Football Club, against Petropolitano Football Club, on 21 May 1905. He scored 58 goals in 58 matches for the club, from 1904 to 1913. He conceived the creation of the team during a class at school, alongside fellow player and founder Emmanuel Sodré (Mimi Sodré's older brother). Ramos was also top scorer in the Campeonato Carioca twice, and scored 7 goals in the historic match 24–0 against Sport Club Mangueira, which took place on 30 May 1909.

== Honours ==
Botafogo

- Campeonato Carioca: 1907, 1910

Individual

- 1907 Campeonato Carioca top scorer: 6 goals
- 1909 Campeonato Carioca top scorer: 18 goals

== See also ==
- History of Botafogo de Futebol e Regatas
