= Horácio da Costa =

Brazilian footballer

Personal information
- Full name: Horácio da Costa Santos
- Date of birth: 9 January 1880
- Place of birth: Rio de Janeiro, Brazil
- Date of death: Unknown
- Position: Forward

Senior career*
Years	Team	Apps	(Gls)
1902–1911	Fluminense		
- * Club domestic league appearances and goals as of 16 February 2024

Horácio da Costa (9 January 1880 – ?), was a Brazilian footballer who played as a forward.

== Career ==
It was at Horácio da Costa's residence on 21 July 1902 where the foundation of Fluminense FC was established. He was also the scorer of the first goal of Fluminense FC against Rio FC, 19 October 1902, and the first goal in the history of the Campeonato Carioca, as well as top scorer in the first edition in 1906. Costa played for the club from 1906 to 1911, only being absent during the 1907 season.

== Honours ==
Fluminense

- Campeonato Carioca: 1906, 1908, 1909

Individual

- 1906 Campeonato Carioca top scorer: 18 goals
