= Augusto Frederico Schmidt =

Brazilian poet

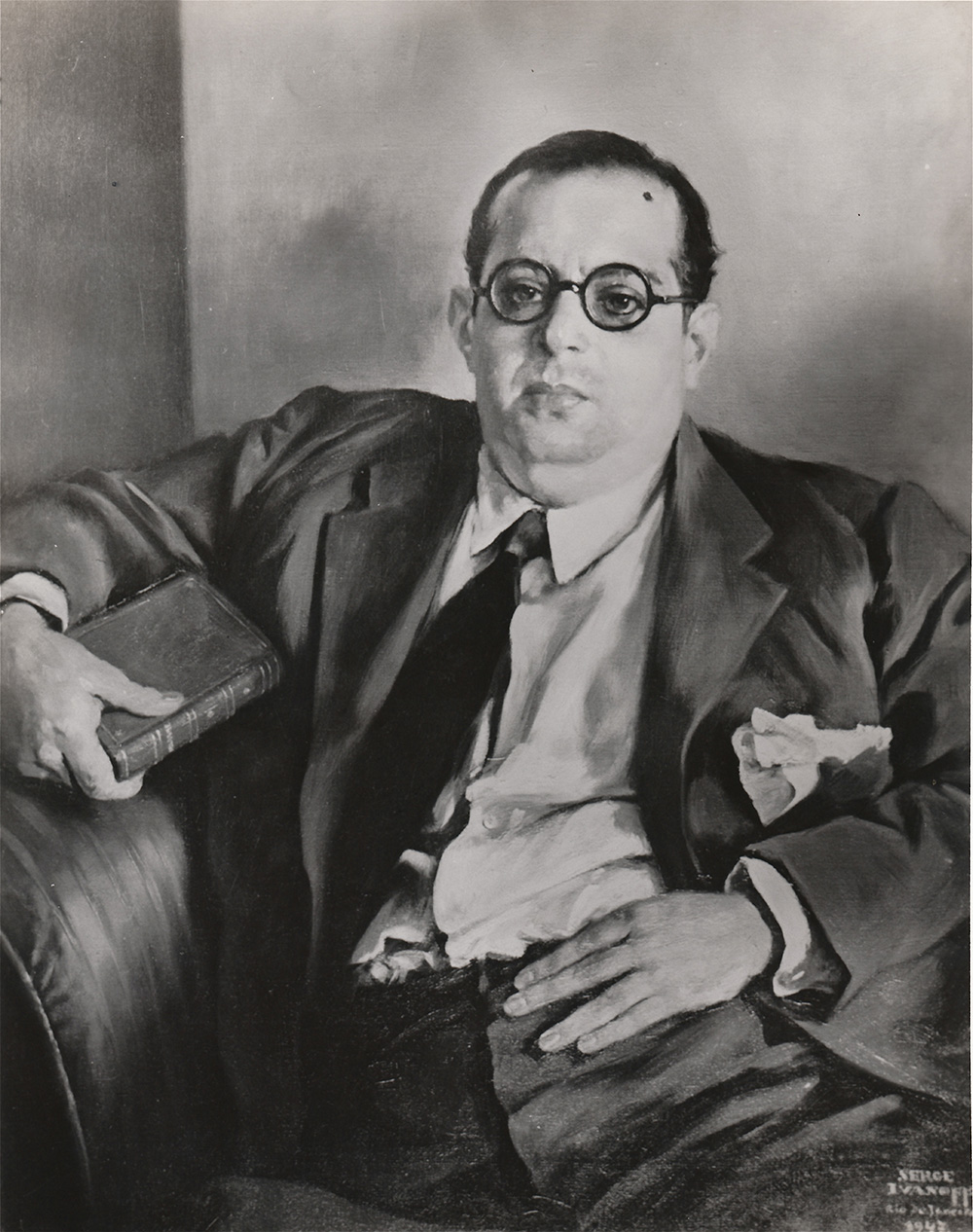
- Born: April 18, 1906; Rio de Janeiro, Rio de Janeiro
- Died: February 9, 1965 (aged 58); Rio de Janeiro, Rio de Janeiro
- Occupations: Poet and writer

Augusto Frederico Schmidt (Rio de Janeiro, April 18, 1906 – Rio de Janeiro, February 8, 1965) was a poet of the second generation of Brazilian Modernism who spoke of death, absence, loss and love in his works.

== Biography ==
Augusto, son of a German Ashkenazi, worked as a special adviser for international affairs to the President of the Republic of Brazil and as Brazil's ambassador to the UN and the then European Economic Community. Married to Yedda Ovalle Schmidt, he was also an editor and owner of the Schmidt Bookstore and Publishing House in Rio de Janeiro. He collaborated with his nephew José Alberto Gueiros, known as Zezinho Gueiros, editor of Monterrey Publishing House, specialized in the stories of Giselle, the naked spy who shook Paris, a pulp fiction format novel based on a pamphlet that David Nasser had created for Diário da Noite.

Augusto died in 1965 leaving no descendants, and was buried in the São João Baptista Cemetery. He had two sisters, Anitta and Magdalena, the latter being his proofreader. He was the grandson of the Viscount Schmidt (Frederico Augusto Schmidt), one of the richest men in the Empire, who had accumulated an immense fortune with an import and export company - Schmidt & Cia, located at 70 Alfândega Street.

== Work and career ==
In addition to being a poet, Augusto Frederico Schmidt was president of the Club de Regatas Botafogo between 1941 and 1942. One of the last acts of his administration was conceiving the fusion of the club he headed with the soccer club of the same name, Botafogo Football Club, creating Botafogo de Futebol e Regatas. The idea originated after the death of basketball player Armando Albano during a match between the two clubs. Despite being the creator, the position of president of the new club did not remain with Schmidt, but with Eduardo Góes Trindade, then president of the other club.

A creative and versatile spirit, Augusto was also an entrepreneur, having been one of the founders of the DISCO supermarket company in Rio de Janeiro, as well as a majority shareholder in Orquima S/A, the precursor of Brazilian nuclear energy, which was taken over by Nuclebrás in 1975.

He was a personal friend of President Juscelino Kubitschek (1902-1976) and created JK's famous slogan: "50 years in 5". He wrote numerous speeches for the president and several of his ideas came to fruition, such as the creation of the Pan-American Operation (OPA), an initiative that would inspire the Alliance for Progress, created by the United States in the Kennedy administration. According to diplomat Niles W. Bond, Schmidt came up with the concrete plans that led to the founding Brasília.

He was also special advisor to the Presidency of the Republic for international affairs, and later, ambassador of Brazil to the UN and the then European Economic Community.

Among his main books are O Galo Branco (1948), Estrela Solitária (1940) and Prelúdio à Revolução. As an editor, he published important books such as Casa Grande e Senzala, by Gilberto Freyre, and Caetés, by Graciliano Ramos. In his early years, he was also the main editor of integralist writers, especially Plínio Salgado.

== Schmidt Bookstore and Publishing House ==
In 1930, Schmidt founded the Católica Bookstore in Rio de Janeiro, which would later become the Schmidt Bookstore and Publishing House, a meeting place for modernist intellectuals of the time. The group known as the Círculo Católico met there. The Bookstore was active until 1939, when it was merged and its headquarters were acquired by Zélio Valverde, whose firm Schmidt became a partner. Among the writers released by Schmidt Publishing House are major authors such as Graciliano Ramos, Raquel de Queiroz, Vinícius de Moraes, Gilberto Freyre, Jorge Amado, among others.

== See also ==
- Books in Brazil
