= 1906 in Brazilian football =

Football in Brazil
- Season: 1906

The following article presents a summary of the 1906 football (soccer) season in Brazil, which was the 5th season of competitive football in the country.

== Campeonato Paulista ==
Final Standings

Position	Team	Points	Played	Won	Drawn	Lost	For	Against	Difference
1	Germânia	12	8	6	0	2	16	8	8
2	SC Internacional de São Paulo	8	8	4	0	4	12	13	−1
3	Paulistano	3	8	1	1	6	8	21	−13
4	Mackenzie	–	–	–	–	–	–	–	–
4	São Paulo Athletic	–	–	–	–	–	–	–	–

Mackenzie abandoned the competition, its matches were canceled and the points in the remaining matches were awarded to the club's opponents. São Paulo Athletic matches were canceled, as the club abandoned the competition.

Germânia declared as the Campeonato Paulista champions.

== Campeonato Carioca ==
Final Standings

Position	Team	Points	Played	Won	Drawn	Lost	For	Against	Difference
1	Fluminense	18	10	9	0	1	52	6	46
2	Paysandu	14	10	7	0	3	26	12	14
3	Rio Cricket	12	10	6	0	4	23	9	14
4	Botafogo	8	10	4	0	6	18	34	−16
5	Bangu	6	10	3	0	7	13	18	−5
6	Football & Athletic	2	10	1	0	9	2	55	−53

Fluminense declared as the Campeonato Carioca champions.

== State championship champions ==
State	Champion
Bahia	São Salvador
Rio de Janeiro (DF)	Fluminense
São Paulo	Germânia
