= Héctor Pericás =

Argentine-born Chilean footballer

Personal information
- Full name: Héctor Cristian Pericás Correa
- Date of birth: 4 May 1979 (age 47)
- Place of birth: Buenos Aires, Argentina
- Height: 1.67 m (5 ft 6 in)
- Position: Midfielder

Youth career
- 1994–1996: Deportivo Guaymallén
- 1996–1998: Gimnasia de Mendoza
- 1998–2000: River Plate

Senior career*
Years	Team	Apps	(Gls)
1997–1998	Gimnasia de Mendoza		
2000	Sporting Cristal		
2000–2001	Everton		
2001–2002	Gimnasia de Mendoza		
2003–2004	Unión La Calera	50	(7)
2005	Deportes Arica	25	(8)
2006–2007	Deportes Melipilla	61	(18)
2008	Palestino	39	(10)
2009–2010	Unión La Calera	52	(8)
2011–2012	Cobresal	35	(9)
2012–2015	Gimnasia de Mendoza	5	(1)
2013–2014	→ Huracán Las Heras (loan)	9	(1)
- * Club domestic league appearances and goals

Héctor Cristian Pericás Correa (born 4 May 1979) is an Argentinian naturalized Chilean former professional footballer.

== Club career ==
As a youth player, Pericás was with Deportivo Guaymallén, Gimnasia de Mendoza, winning the Liga Mendocina in 1997–98, and River Plate, in addition to a stint with Peruvian side Sporting Cristal, before joining Everton de Viña del Mar in Chile.

Pericás had a successful spell in Chile, highlighting his period in Palestino, where he helped the team to achieve the 2008 Torneo Clausura's vice–championship.

In 2009, he signed for Unión La Calera. He left that club on 24 December 2010.

He finished his career in Gimnasia y Esgrima de Mendoza, having been loaned to Huracán Las Heras in the 2013–14 season.

== Personal life ==
In 2007, he lost his wife, Andrea Almarcha, who suddenly died whilst he was playing with Deportes Melipilla, in the age, freshly promoted to 2007 Primera División de Chile season after winning the 2006 Primera B.

In 2013, he was arrested by the police for selling contraband cigarettes.

== Honors ==
Gimnsia de Mendoza

- Liga Mendocina de Fútbol: 1997–98

Deportes Melipilla

- Primera B (1): 2006

Palestino

- Primera División de Chile (1): 2008 Clausura Runner-up
