= Armando Albano =

Brazilian basketball player (1909–1942)

Personal information
- Born: 19 July 1909; São Paulo, Brazil
- Died: 11 June 1942 (aged 32); Rio de Janeiro, Brazil

Sport
- Sport: Basketball

Armando Albano (19 July 1909 – 11 June 1942) was a Brazilian basketball player. He competed in the men's tournament at the 1936 Summer Olympics. Albano died after collapsing at half time of a match between Botafogo Football Club and Clube de Regatas Botafogo.
