= Copa Peregrino =

2008 football tournament in Rio de Janeiro, Brazil

Copa Peregrino was a friendly football tournament held in 2008 between Brazilian clubs from the city of Rio de Janeiro and Norwegian clubs from diverse cities. It was hosted in Rio de Janeiro and predominantly held in the stadium Giulite Coutinho, with one match played in the olympic stadium Nilton Santos. The champion was Botafogo.

== Groups ==
=== Brazilian teams ===
Classification
Team		Pts	Pld	W	D	L	GF	GA	GD
1	Botafogo*	7	3	2	1	0	8	2	6
2	Madureira	4	3	1	1	1	5	4	1
3	América	2	3	0	2	1	4	5	-1
*Boavista played the last match representing Botafogo.
Pts - points; Pld - total games played; W - wins; D - draws; L - losses; GF - goals for; GA - goals against; GD - goals difference

=== Norwegian teams ===
Classification
Team		Pts	Pld	W	D	L	GF	GA	GD
1	Start	5	3	1	2	0	5	4	1
2	Viking	4	3	1	1	1	4	7	-3
3	Stabæk	1	3	0	1	2	2	6	-4
Pts - points; Pld - total games played; W - wins; D - draws; L - losses; GF - goals for; GA - goals against; GD - goals difference

== Final standings ==
Classification
Team		Pts	Pld	W	D	L	GF	GA	GD	%
1	Botafogo*	7	3	2	1	0	8	2	6	78
2	Start	5	3	1	2	0	5	4	1	56
3	Madureira	4	3	1	1	1	5	4	1	44
4	Viking	4	3	1	1	1	4	7	-3	44
5	América	2	3	0	2	1	4	5	-1	22
6	Stabæk	1	3	0	1	2	2	6	-4	11
*Boavista played the last match representing Botafogo.
Pts - points; Pld - total games played; W - wins; D - draws; L - losses; GF - goals for; GA - goals against; GD - goals difference

=== Champion ===
Copa Peregrino

Botafogo
(Unbeaten)

== Scorers ==
- Paulsen, Start, 2 goals;
- Khalili, Start, 2 goals;
- Alessandro, Botafogo, 1 goal;
- Édson, Botafogo, 1 goal;
- Fábio, Botafogo, 1 goal;
- Jorge Henrique, Botafogo, 1 goal;
- Lúcio Flávio, Botafogo, 1 goal
- Zé Carlos, Botafogo, 1 goal;
- Hulsker, Start, 1 goal;
- Amaral, Madureira, 1 goal;
- Felipe Alves, Madureira, 1 goal;
- Paulo Roberto, Madureira, 1 goal;
- Mílson Santos, Madureira, 1 goal;
- Aron, América, 1 goal;
- Assad, América, 1 goal;
- Élvis, América, 1 goal;
- Marco Brito, América, 1 goal;
- Austnes, Viking, 1 goal;
- Fillo, Viking, 1 goal;
- Adelson, Viking, 1 goal;
- Espen, Stabæk, 1 goal;
- Bruno, Boavista, 1 goal;
- Flávio Santos, Boavista, 1 goal;
- Segerström (own goal), Stabæk, 1 goal;
- Máximo (own goal), América, 1 goal;
- Cléberson (own goal), América, 1 goal.
