= 1906 Campeonato Carioca =

Campeonato Carioca
- Season: 1906
- Champions: Fluminense
- Matches: 30
- Goals: 134 (4.47 per match)
- Top goalscorer: Horácio da Costa (Fluminense) – 18 goals
- Biggest home win: Fluminense 8-0 Botafogo (13 May 1906)
- Biggest away win: Football & Athletic 0-11 Fluminense (9 September 1906)
- Highest scoring: Football & Athletic 0-11 Fluminense (9 September 1906)

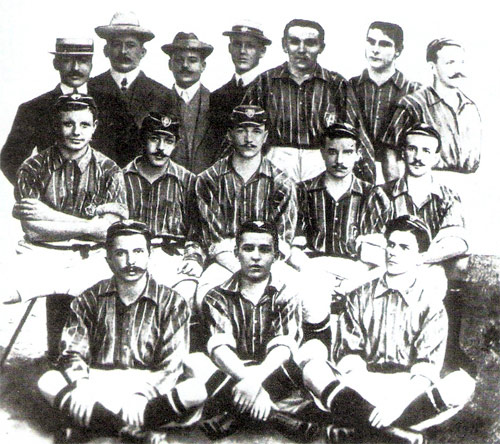
Brazilian football team Fluminense that won its first Campeonato Carioca in 1906.

The 1906 Campeonato Carioca, the first edition of that championship, kicked off on 3 May 1906, and ended on 28 October 1906. It was organized by LMF (Liga Metropolitana de Football, or Metropolitan Football League). Six teams participated. Fluminense won the title for the 1st time. No teams were relegated.

== Participating teams ==
Club	Home location	Previous season
Botafogo	Botafogo, Rio de Janeiro	–
Bangu	Bangu, Rio de Janeiro	–
Fluminense	Laranjeiras, Rio de Janeiro	–
Football & Athletic	Andaraí, Rio de Janeiro	–
Paissandu	Flamengo, Rio de Janeiro	–
Rio Cricket	Praia Grande, Niterói	–

== System ==
The tournament would be disputed in a double round-robin format, with the team with the most points winning the title. The last-placed team would dispute a playoff against the champion of the second level.

== Championship ==
Pos	Team	Pld	W	D	L	GF	GA	GD	Pts	Qualification or relegation
1	Fluminense	10	9	0	1	52	6	+46	18	Champions
2	Paysandu	10	7	0	3	26	12	+14	14	
3	Rio Cricket	10	6	0	4	23	9	+14	12	
4	Botafogo	10	4	0	6	18	34	−16	8	
5	Bangu	10	3	0	7	13	18	−5	6	
6	Football & Athletic	10	1	0	9	2	55	−53	2	Relegation Playoffs

Updated to match(es) played on October 28, 1906. Source: RSSSF.com
Rules for classification: 1) points; 2) goal difference; 3) wins; 4) number of goals scored.

=== Relegation Playoffs ===
4 November 1906

Football & Athletic	5 – 2	Riachuelo
John Walmsley; J. Allen; Botafogo		Barroso Magno

Rua Guanabara, Rio de Janeiro
Referee: W. Salmond
