= Garrincha =

Brazilian footballer (1933–1983)

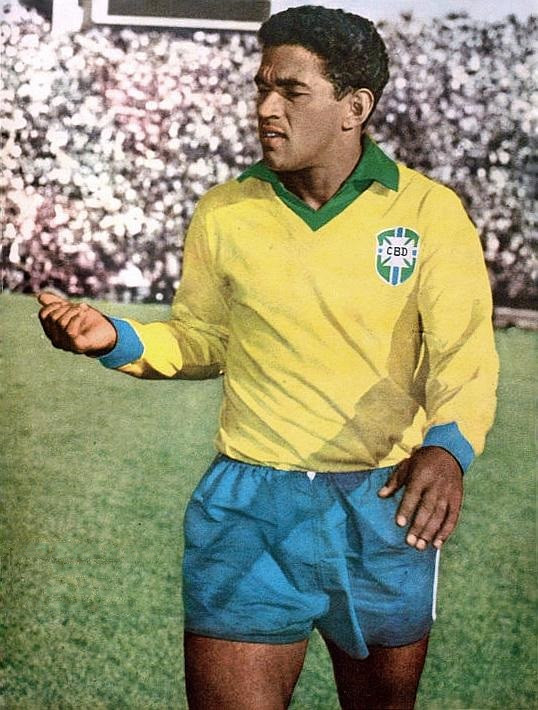
- Garrincha playing for Brazil at the 1962 FIFA World Cup

Personal information
- Full name: Manuel Francisco dos Santos
- Date of birth: 28 October 1933
- Place of birth: Magé, Rio de Janeiro, Brazil
- Date of death: 20 January 1983 (aged 49)
- Place of death: Rio de Janeiro, Brazil
- Height: 1.69 m (5 ft 7 in)
- Position: Right winger

Youth career
- 1947–1952: Pau Grande
- 1949–1950: Cruzeiro do Sul FC

Senior career*
Years	Team	Apps	(Gls)
1951	Serrano		
1953–1965	Botafogo	238	(84)
1966	Corinthians	4	(0)
1968	Atlético Junior	1	(0)
1968–1969	Flamengo	5	(0)
1970–1971	Sacrofano	12	(6)
1971–1972	Olaria	6	(0)
Total		266+	(90+)

International career
1955–1966	Brazil	50	(12)
Medal record
Men's Football
Representing Brazil
FIFA World Cup
Winner	1958 Sweden
Winner	1962 Chile
South American Championship
Runner-up	1957 Peru
Runner-up	1959 Argentina
- * Club domestic league appearances and goals

Manuel Francisco dos Santos (28 October 1933 – 20 January 1983), nicknamed Mané Garrincha, best known as simply Garrincha (Portuguese pronunciation: [ɡaˈʁĩʃɐ], "wren"), was a Brazilian professional footballer who played as a right winger. He is widely regarded as one of the greatest players of all time, and by many, one of the greatest dribblers ever.

Garrincha played a vital role in Brazil's 1958 and 1962 World Cup victories. In 1962, when Pelé was injured, Garrincha led Brazil to a World Cup victory with a dominating performance throughout the tournament. He also became the first player to win the Golden Ball (Player of the tournament), Golden Boot (Leading Goalscorer) and the World Cup in the same tournament. He was also named in the World Cup All-Star Teams of both 1958 World Cup and 1962 World Cup. In 1994, he was named in the FIFA World Cup All-Time Team. Brazil never lost a match while fielding both Garrincha and Pelé. In 1999, he came seventh in the FIFA Player of the Century grand jury vote. He is a member of the World Team of the 20th Century, and was inducted into the Brazilian Football Hall of Fame. Due to his immense popularity in Brazil, he was also called Alegria do Povo (People's Joy) and Anjo de Pernas Tortas (Bent-Legged Angel).

At club level, Garrincha played the majority of his professional career for the Brazilian team Botafogo. In the Maracanã Stadium, the home team room is known as "Garrincha". In the capital Brasília, the Estádio Nacional Mané Garrincha is named after him. He is credited for inspiring the first bullfighting chants of olé to be used at football grounds.

== Early life ==
Garrincha was born in Pau Grande, a district of Magé, in the state of Rio de Janeiro, in 1933. He was born with his right leg 6 centimetres shorter than his left, also his left leg turned outwards and his right turned inwards, leading one doctor to certify him as crippled as a child.

His father was an alcoholic, drinking cachaça heavily, a problem which Garrincha would inherit. A boy with a carefree attitude, he was smaller than other kids his age, earning him the nickname Garrincha (meaning "wren") from his sister. The name stuck and by the age of four years he was known as Garrincha to his family and friends. Garrincha was also known as Mané (short for Manuel) by his friends. The combined Mané Garrincha is common among fans in Brazil.

Garrincha was known amongst footballing scouts, but did not arrive in professional football until his late teens; he had no interest in a professional career despite his immense talent.

Garrincha's younger brother, Jimmy dos Santos, played 20 games for Série A side Vasco da Gama in 1959.

== Club career ==
Garrincha was already married and a parent when he signed for Botafogo in 1953. Team officials were ecstatic to learn that he was over 18 and able to be treated as a professional. In his first training session, he demonstrated his extraordinary skills by dribbling the ball through the legs of Nílton Santos, a Brazilian international defender and defensive midfielder who had 16 international caps. Santos was so impressed with the young Garrincha, he asked that Botafogo sign him. He played in a 5–0 win for Botafogo's reserves and then scored a hat trick on his first-team début against Bonsucesso on 19 July 1953.

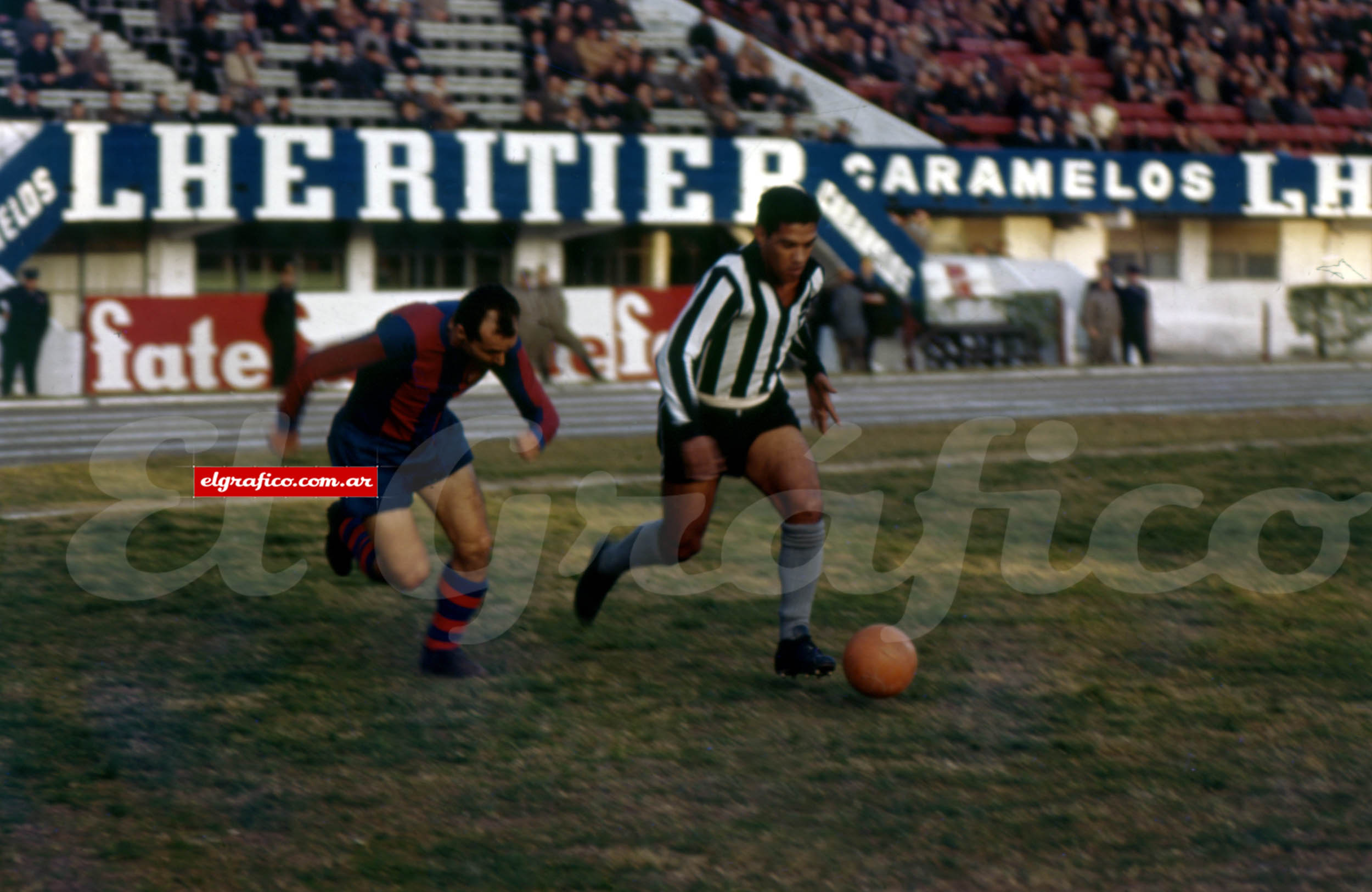
Garrincha playing for Botafogo in a 2–0 win against Barcelona for Copa Iberoamericana, friendly tournament in 1964 at Buenos Aires

Garrincha continued to play brilliantly, but Brazil had other talented players in his position, notably Julinho and together with a new European style of play centered on teamwork, he was not named in the squad for the 1954 World Cup. He helped Botafogo win the Campeonato Carioca in 1957 by scoring 20 goals in 26 games finishing second in the league scoring charts and this convinced the national team selectors to name him to the 1958 World Cup squad.

After the 1962 World Cup, Garrincha returned to Rio and carried Botafogo to victory in the 1962 Campeonato Carioca final against Flamengo. Garrincha played for Botafogo for 12 years, the bulk of his professional career. He won the Campeonato Carioca three times with them, scored 232 goals in 581 matches, and became a symbol of the history of the club.

In 1966, with his career declining, he was sold to Corinthians. Two years later, he signed for Colombian team Atlético Junior. The same year, he went back to Brazil and joined Flamengo, where he would stay until 1969. In 1971, there were rumours that Garrincha, 38, would join French club Red Star, but he never signed and stayed in Brazil.

An entertainer renowned for his dribbling skills in taking on opposing players, Garrincha inspiring the first bullfighting chants of olé to be used at football grounds; during a 1958 club game for Botafogo he gave a footballing lesson to River Plate defender Vairo, constantly teasing, feinting and going past him to ole's from the crowd, and when he "forgot" the ball and sprinted away with Vairo running after him the chants of olés changed to laughter. Garrincha's professional career as a footballer lasted until 1972, when he played for Olaria, but he played occasional exhibition matches until 1982.

Garrincha was subject to numerous transfer attempts by rich European clubs like Juventus of Turin, Italy who tried to sign him in 1954. Real Madrid of Spain tried to sign him in 1959 after some stunning performances by him on a tour of Europe. Inter Milan, AC Milan and Juventus of Italy considered jointly signing him in 1963 (he would have to spend a season with each); a deal that would have been unique in football.

== International career ==
Garrincha played 50 international matches for Brazil between 1955 and 1966, appearing in three World Cups (1958, 1962, and 1966). Brazil lost only one match with him on the pitch—against Hungary in 1966, which was also his final appearance for the national team.

His first cap was against Chile in Rio de Janeiro in 1955. He played two matches at the Copa América of 1957 and four in the 1959 edition, Brazil finished runners up in both editions.

=== 1958 World Cup ===
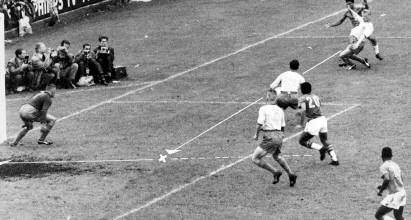
Garrincha crosses the ball to Vavá in the 1958 FIFA World Cup Final.

On 29 May, ten days before the 1958 World Cup finals started, Garrincha scored one of his most famous goals, against Fiorentina in Italy. He beat four defenders and the goalkeeper, before stopping on the goal line. Rather than kicking the ball into the open goal, he then dribbled past the returning Enzo Robotti to score. Despite his stunning performance his coaches were upset at what they considered an irresponsible move and this likely led to Garrincha not being picked for Brazil's first two matches of the 1958 tournament. However, he did start their third match against the USSR; this match marked the debut of both Garrincha and Pelé (although Garrincha was seven years older than Pele, both being born in October, respectively in 1933 and in 1940). The Soviets were one of the favourites for the tournament, and the Brazilians had been nervous about playing them. Their manager, Vicente Feola, decided to attack directly from the kickoff. Garrincha received the ball on the right wing, beat three opposing players and took a shot which hit the post. With the match still less than a minute old, he set up a chance for Pelé, who hit the crossbar, and continually caused problems for the Soviet defence. Brazil were so impressive in the opening moments that the game's start is often referred to as "the best three minutes of football of all time". Brazil won the match 2–0.

"Garrincha was more of a danger than Pelé I believe at the time, a phenomenon, capable of sheer magic."

— Wales defender Mel Hopkins who faced Garrincha in 1958

Following the Brazilians' narrow 1–0 quarter-final win against Wales on 19 June 1958, Mel Hopkins (the fullback who faced him that game) described Garrincha as "a phenomenon, capable of sheer magic. It was difficult to know which way he was going to go because of his legs and because he was as comfortable on his left foot as his right, so he could cut inside or go down the line and he had a ferocious shot too."

In the final against Sweden, Brazil fell behind 0–1 early, but rapidly equalized after Garrincha went past his marker on the right wing and sent a cross for Vavá to score. Before the end of the first half, Garrincha made a similar play, again setting up Vavá to make the score 2–1. Brazil ended winning the match and its first World Cup trophy, with Garrincha being one of the best players of the tournament; he was voted to the "Best XI" for the competition.

Garrincha never bothered about the 'details' of the game. As his teammates were celebrating the World Cup win, he was initially bemused, having been under the impression that the competition was more league-like and that Brazil would play all the other teams twice.

=== 1958–1962 ===
Garrincha put on weight after the World Cup, partly because of his drinking, so he was dropped from the national team for a friendly match in Rio against England on 13 May 1959. Later that month, he went on tour with Botafogo in Sweden and got a local girl pregnant. When he returned to Brazil, he drove home to Pau Grande and ran over his father, Amaro. He drove off without stopping, with an angry mob chasing him, and when they caught up with him they found him "drunk, almost catatonic, and with no grasp of what he had done." In August, his wife, Nair, gave birth to their fifth child, and his mistress Iraci announced her first pregnancy. His father died of liver cancer on 10 October having been dependent on alcohol for years.

=== 1962 World Cup ===
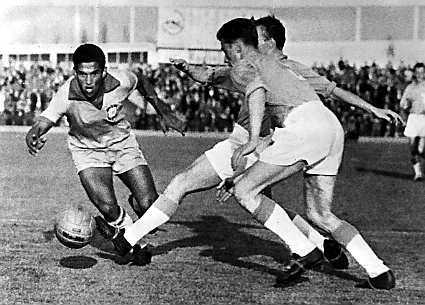
Garrincha (left) during the World Cup 1962

Garrincha was the most outstanding player of the 1962 FIFA World Cup. When Pelé suffered an injury after the second match and was sidelined for the rest of the tournament, Garrincha played a leading role in Brazil's triumph, excelling particularly against England and Chile, scoring 4 goals in those two matches.

After one win and one draw, Brazil faced Spain, without Pelé. The South Americans were losing 0–1 in the second half. Amarildo, Pelé's substitute for the remainder of the tournament, scored the equalizer. Five minutes before the end, Garrincha took the ball on the right flank, dribbled past a defender and paused. Then he dribbled past the same man and another defender, and sent a cross to Amarildo, who scored again to win the match.

In the quarter-finals against England, Garrincha opened the score with a header off a corner kick. England equalized before half time. In the second half, Vavá scored Brazil's second goal off a rebound of a shot by Garrincha; minutes later, Garrincha received a ball outside the penalty area, paused, and sent a curved shot – known as the "banana shot" – into the bottom of the net. Brazil won 3–1 and advanced to the semi-finals. The British football press said he "was Stanley Matthews, Tom Finney and a snake charmer all rolled into one".

During the quarter final, a stray dog ran onto the pitch and evaded all of the players' efforts to catch it until England striker Jimmy Greaves got down on all fours to beckon the animal. Though successful in catching the dog, it managed to urinate all over Greaves' England shirt. Greaves claimed that Garrincha thought the incident was so amusing that he took the dog home as a pet. Ruy Castro's book expands upon this, by clarifying that the dog was captured by an official, and raffled off to the Brazilian squad, a raffle which Garrincha won. The dog was named "Bi" (from "bi-campeões" - "two times champions").

He scored two more goals in the semi-final against the hosts, Chile, as Brazil went on to win 4–2. His first goal was a 20-yard left-foot shot; the second one, a header. A subsequent headline in the Chilean newspaper El Mercurio read: "What planet is Garrincha from?" Garrincha was sent off in that match after 83 minutes for kicking a Chilean player. Garrincha said he did it because he had been repeatedly kicked during the match. However, he was not suspended for the following match as there were no automatic one-match bans for red cards at the tournament. A disciplinary committee the following day decided against suspending him for the final likely influenced by intervention from Chilean President Jorge Alessandri and Peruvian President Manuel Prado. In addition, the Uruguayan linesman Esteban Marino who saw the red card incident and alerted the referee left the country and didn't attend the committee to give evidence. It has been alleged that Marino had received a bribe from Brazil's head referee at the time. Garrincha was the only player to receive a red card in a World Cup match and not be suspended for the next match until Folarin Balogun in the 2026 World Cup.

Brazil faced Czechoslovakia in the final. Garrincha played despite suffering from a severe fever, which did not prevent Brazil from winning 3–1 and him from getting voted player of the tournament. It was the second consecutive World Cup won by Garrincha and Brazil.

=== 1966 World Cup ===
Though well short of match fitness and still struggling with a knee injury, which would plague him for the rest of his career, Garrincha still played in the first match of the tournament, a 2–0 win against Bulgaria, Garrincha scored one of the goals of this game with a free kick taken with the outside of his foot (the second goal of this game was scored by Pelé - this was the only time when Garrincha and Pelé both scored goals in the same game). Then Brazil lost 1–3 to Hungary at Goodison Park, in Garrincha's last ever international match, which was the only time Garrincha lost a match with the Brazil national team; he did not play in the last match of the first round against Portugal. Brazil were eliminated in the first round.

=== Retirement from professional football and farewell ===
"Garrincha was an incredible player, one of the best there has ever been. He could do things with the ball that no other player could."

— Pelé

In 1973, although he was still signed by Olaria, Garrincha decided to leave professional football. Apart from his age (he was already 40), "there was another reason for wanting to retire: he had become a grandfather for the first time – his daughter Edenir had just given birth to Alexandra – and being a professional football player and a grandfather felt weird." Alexandra with her three children still live in Garrincha's house in Pau Grande.

On 19 December 1973, a farewell match for Garrincha between a FIFA World team and Brazil was celebrated at the Maracanã Stadium in Rio de Janeiro, in front of 131,000 spectators. The FIFA team was composed mainly of Argentine and Uruguayan players, while Brazil fielded Pelé, Carlos Alberto, and several other members of the 1970 World Cup winning squad. Garrincha started the match, and while in the first half, at a point when Brazil had the ball in attack, the referee stopped the match so Garrincha could leave the pitch and receive the crowd's respects. Garrincha then did a lap around the pitch before disappearing through the stadium's tunnel.

== Final years and death ==
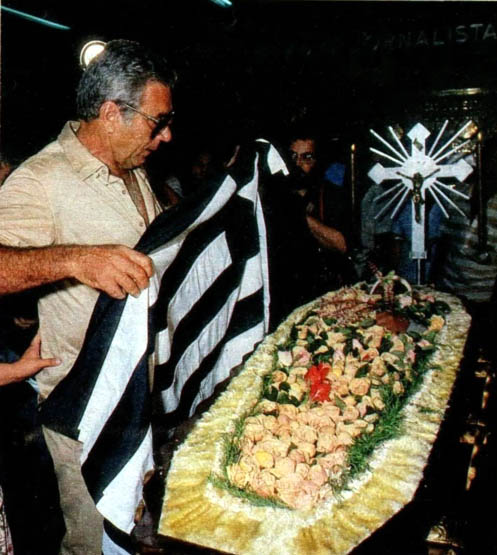
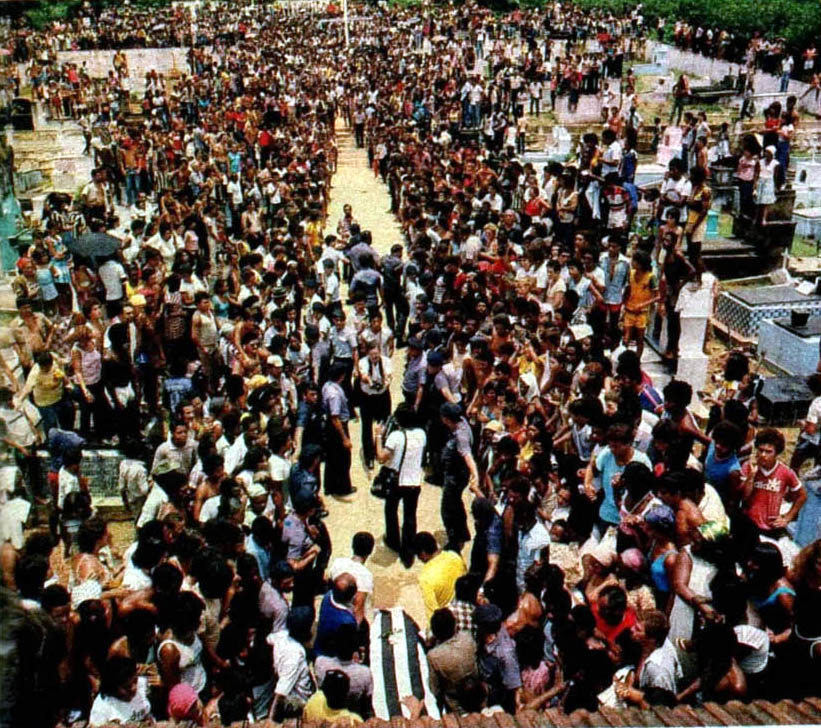
(Left): Nilton Santos with a flag of Botafogo during the funeral; (right): the coffin arriving at the cemetery. The procession was attended by near 100,000 people

The success Garrincha enjoyed on the football pitch was in stark contrast to his personal life. He drank heavily throughout his adult life and was involved in several serious road accidents, notably a crash into a lorry in April 1969, which killed his mother-in-law. He was married twice, first to Nair Marques in 1952 (they separated in 1965), a factory worker from Pau Grande with whom he had eight daughters, and second to Elza Soares, a samba singer whom he married in an unofficial ceremony in March 1966. Soares had also been married previously. The couple separated in 1977, when Soares left him after he struck her during an argument. Garrincha had other significant affairs, including one with showgirl Angelita Martinez, and he is known to have fathered at least 14 children.

After a series of financial and marital problems, Garrincha died of cirrhosis of the liver on 20 January 1983, in an alcoholic coma in Rio de Janeiro. He had been hospitalized eight times in the previous year, and by the time of his death he was a physical and mental wreck. Despite poor press during his second marriage and relative obscurity in his last years, his funeral procession, from the Maracanã to Pau Grande, drew millions of fans, friends and former players to pay their respects. His epitaph reads: "Here rests in peace the one who was the Joy of the People – Mané Garrincha." People had painted on the wall: Obrigado, Garrincha, por você ter vivido (Thank you, Garrincha, for having lived).

== Style of play ==
"In the entire history of football no one made more people happy. When he was out there, the pitch was a circus ring, the ball a tamed animal, the match a party invitation. Garrincha nurtured his public, the ball, and together they created such mischief that people almost died laughing. He jumped over it, it gambolled around him, hid itself away, skipped off and made him run after it. And on the way, his opponents ran into each other."

— Eduardo Galeano, Uruguayan writer

An agile right winger with a low centre of gravity, Garrincha was known for his dribbling, close control, and frequent use of feints on the right wing.

He was able to score goals and create chances for teammates, and also functioned as a crosser and set-piece taker. He occasionally used bending free kicks and corners struck with the outside of his foot.

His dribbling ability was frequently noted by journalists and commentators. Scott Murray of The Guardian described him as “the greatest dribbler ever.”

Adored by the Brazilian public due to his innocence, carefree attitude and ability to entertain in making fools of opposing players, Garrincha was referred to as "Joy of the People". Djalma Santos, his Brazil teammate, stated, "He had a childish spirit. Garrincha was football's answer to Charlie Chaplin."

Examples of his shooting ability are his goals in World Cups against England in 1962 and Bulgaria in 1966. He was also able to turn on himself at top speed and explode at unusual angles, which he used to great effect. The numerous attacks and goal opportunities he generated through individual plays would often end up in an accurate pass to a teammate in a position to score. This occurred in the first two of Brazil's goals in the 1958 World Cup final and the second goal against Spain in the 1962 tournament. He was also an excellent header of the ball despite his relatively short stature. He is one of a few players to have scored direct from a corner, a feat he managed to do four times in his career.

Regarded as one of the greatest players of all time, he was voted into the World Team of the 20th Century by 250 of the world's most respected football writers and journalists, came seventh in the FIFA Player of the Century grand jury vote, and was named in the FIFA World Cup All-Time Team.

== Career statistics ==
=== Club ===
Appearances and goals by club, season and competition
Club	Season	League			Cup		Continental		Other		Total	
Club	Season	Division	Apps	Goals	Apps	Goals	Apps	Goals	Apps	Goals	Apps	Goals
Botafogo	1953	Campeonato Carioca	26	20					0	0	26	20
Botafogo	1954	Campeonato Carioca	27	1					9	8	36	9
Botafogo	1955	Campeonato Carioca	19	3					9	2	28	5
Botafogo	1956	Campeonato Carioca	20	5					0	0	20	5
Botafogo	1957	Campeonato Carioca	21	6					9	2	30	8
Botafogo	1958	Campeonato Carioca	26	9					9	1	35	10
Botafogo	1959	Campeonato Carioca	24	9					5	3	29	12
Botafogo	1960	Campeonato Carioca	21	9					9	1	30	10
Botafogo	1961	Campeonato Carioca	21	6					11	2	32	8
Botafogo	1962	Campeonato Carioca / Taça Brasil	20 / 5	8 / 0					7	2	32	10
Botafogo	1963	Campeonato Carioca	3	1			2	0	1	0	7	1
Botafogo	1964	Campeonato Carioca	4	0					7	3	11	3
Botafogo	1965	Campeonato Carioca	1	0					7	0	8	0
Botafogo	Total		238	84			2	0	83	17	323	101
Corinthians	1966	Campeonato Paulista	4	0					6	1	10	1
Atlético Junior	1968	Categoría Primera A	1	0					–	–	1	0
Flamengo	1968	Torneio Roberto Gomes Pedrosa	1	0							1	0
Flamengo	1969	Campeonato Carioca	4	0							4	0
Flamengo	Total		5	0							5	0
Olaria	1972	Campeonato Carioca	6	0							6	0
Career total			254	84			2	0	89	18	345	102

=== International ===
Appearances and goals by national team and year
National team	Year	Apps	Goals
Brazil	1955	1	0
Brazil	1956	0	0
Brazil	1957	6	0
Brazil	1958	5	0
Brazil	1959	4	0
Brazil	1960	5	2
Brazil	1961	4	1
Brazil	1962	12	6
Brazil	1963	0	0
Brazil	1964	0	0
Brazil	1965	6	0
Brazil	1966	7	3
Total		50	12

Scores and results list Brazil's goal tally first, score column indicates score after each Garrincha goal.

List of international goals scored by Garrincha
No.	Date	Venue	Opponent	Score	Result	Competition	Ref.
1	29 April 1960	Nasser Stadium, Cairo, Egypt	United Arab Republic	–	5–0	Friendly	
2	6 May 1960	Nasser Stadium, Cairo, Egypt	United Arab Republic	–	3–0	Friendly	
3	7 May 1961	Estadio Nacional, Santiago, Chile	Chile	–	2–1	1961 Copa Bernardo O'Higgins	
4	21 April 1962	Estádio Municipal, Rio de Janeiro, Brazil	Paraguay	–	6–0	1962 Taça Oswaldo Cruz	
5	12 May 1962	Estádio Municipal, Rio de Janeiro, Brazil	Wales	–	3–1	Friendly	
6	10 June 1962	Estadio Sausalito, Viña del Mar, Chile	England	1–0	3–1	1962 FIFA World Cup	
7	10 June 1962	Estadio Sausalito, Viña del Mar, Chile	England	3–1	3–1	1962 FIFA World Cup	
8	13 June 1962	Estadio Sausalito, Viña del Mar, Chile	Chile	1–0	4–2	1962 FIFA World Cup	
9	13 June 1962	Estadio Sausalito, Viña del Mar, Chile	Chile	2–0	4–2	1962 FIFA World Cup	
10	14 May 1966	Maracanã Stadium, Rio de Janeiro, Brazil	Wales	–	3–1	Friendly	
11	8 June 1966	Maracanã Stadium, Rio de Janeiro, Brazil	Poland	2–0	2–1	Friendly	
12	12 July 1966	Goodison Park, Liverpool, England	Bulgaria	2–0	2–0	1966 FIFA World Cup	

== Honours ==
=== Club ===
Botafogo

- Campeonato Carioca: 1957, 1961, 1962
- Torneio Rio-São Paulo: 1962, 1964
- International Quadrangular Tournament: 1954
- Interclub Tournament Pentagonal Mexico: 1958
- International Tournament of Colombia: 1960
- International Tournament in Costa Rica: 1961
- Torneio Início do Campeonato Carioca: 1961, 1962, 1963
- Torneio Pentagonal do México: 1962
- Taça dos Campeões Estaduais Rio-São Paulo: 1962
- Torneio de Paris: 1963
- Torneio Jubileu de Ouro da Associação: 1964
- Torneio de Futebol de La Paz: 1964
- Torneio Ibero-Americano: 1964
- Torneio Quadrangular do Suriname: 1964

Corinthians

- Torneio Rio-São Paulo: 1966

=== International ===
Brazil

- FIFA World Cup: 1958, 1962
- Copa Bernardo O'Higgins: 1955, 1959, 1961
- Taça Oswaldo Cruz: 1958, 1961, 1962

=== Individual ===
- FIFA World Cup Golden Ball: 1962
- FIFA World Cup Golden Boot (joint top scorer): 1962, 4 goals
- Campeonato Carioca Player of the Year: 1957, 1961, 1962
- FIFA World Cup All-Star Team: 1958, 1962
- World Soccer World XI: 1962
- FIFA Hall of Fame: 1999
- IFFHS South America Team of the 20th Century: 2000
- Mexican Football Hall of Fame: 2011
- IFFHS Football Legends: 2016
- Ballon d'Or Dream Team: second team, right winger, 2020
- IFFHS All-Time Brazil Men's Dream Team: 2021

== Legacy ==
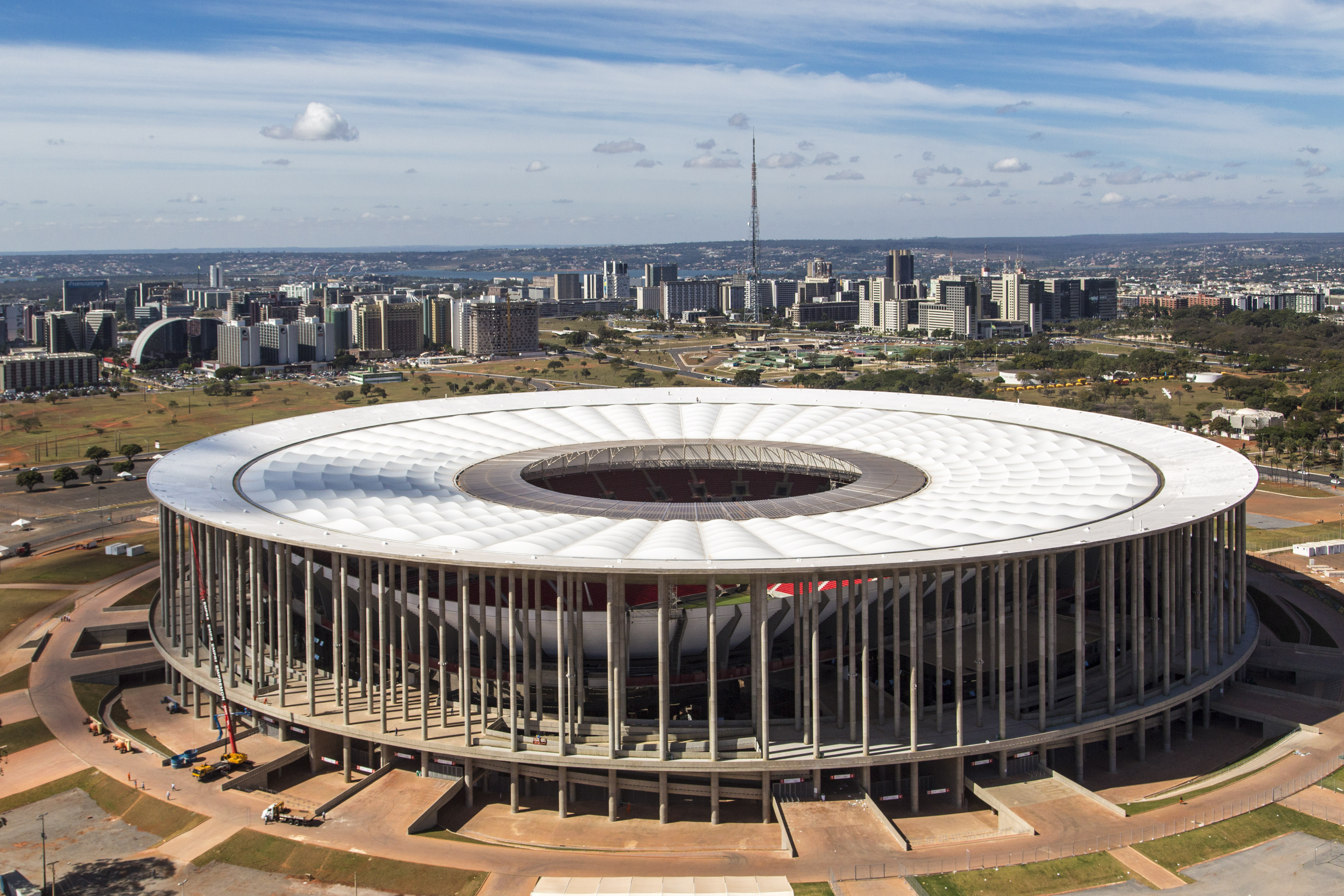
Estádio Nacional Mané Garrincha in Brasília

The Estádio Nacional Mané Garrincha, inaugurated in 1974 and originally named "Estádio Governador Hélio Prates da Silveira", was renamed in honor of Garrincha shortly after his death.

His career was presented in the 1962 film Garrincha, Alegria do Povo, and in 2003, another movie, called Garrincha – Estrela Solitária ("Lonely Star"), based on Ruy Castro's book, depicted his life on and off the field.

== See also ==
- List of FIFA World Cup top goalscorers

== Bibliography ==
- Ruy Castro (2005). Garrincha – The triumph and tragedy of Brazil's forgotten footballing hero. Yellow Jersey Press, London. ISBN 0-224-06433-9. Original in Portuguese: Estrela Solitária (Lonely Star), 1995
- Bellos, Alex (2002). Futebol: The Brazilian Way of Life. Bloomsbury. ISBN 0-7475-6179-6.
- Antezana, Luis H. (1998). Un pajarillo llamado "Mané". Plural Editores. ISBN 84-89891-29-X.
