= Pampolini =

Brazilian footballer (1932–2006)

Personal information
- Full name: Américo Pampolini Filho
- Date of birth: 24 December 1932
- Place of birth: Belo Horizonte, Brazil
- Date of death: 20 December 2006 (aged 73)
- Place of death: Rio de Janeiro, Brazil
- Position: Midfielder

Youth career
- São Cristóvão

Senior career*
| Years | Team | Apps | (Gls) |
| 1952–1954 | Cruzeiro | 80 | (11) |
| 1955–1962 | Botafogo | 347 | (27) |
| 1962–1965 | Portuguesa | | |
| 1965–1966 | Atlético Mineiro | | |
| 1966 | Taubaté | | |
| 1966–1968 | Portuguesa | | |
- * Club domestic league appearances and goals as of 23 May 2024

Américo Pampolini Filho (24 December 1932 – 20 December 2006), simply known as Pampolini, was a Brazilian professional footballer who played as a midfielder.

== Career ==
A central midfielder for Botafogo in the 1960s, Pampolini began his career at São Cristóvão, and later at Cruzeiro EC where he played from 1952 to 1954. For Botafogo he made 347 appearances and was part of winning three state titles. He also had a great time at Portuguesa, state runner-up in 1964, Atlético Mineiro and Taubaté.

== Honours ==
Botafogo

- Campeonato Carioca: 1957, 1961, 1962
- Torneio Rio-São Paulo: 1962
- Torneio Início: 1961

== Death ==
Pampolini died in Rio de Janeiro, on 20 December 2006, aged 73.
