= Paulistinha (footballer) =

Brazilian footballer and manager (1939–2005)

Personal information
- Full name: Oswaldo Carlos Sampaio Júnior
- Date of birth: 20 August 1939
- Place of birth: Mairinque, Brazil
- Date of death: 9 February 2005 (aged 65)
- Place of death: Rio de Janeiro, Brazil
- Position: Full-back

Senior career*
Years	Team	Apps	(Gls)
1958–1969	Botafogo	309	(6)

International career
1958	Brazil U20		

Managerial career
- 1972: Tiradentes
- 1974: Botafogo
- 1977: Botafogo
- 1977–1978: Ghana
- 1978: CSA
- 1985–1987: Saudi Arabia U20
- 1987: Saudi Arabia
- 1995–????: Goldfields Obuasi
- * Club domestic league appearances and goals

Oswaldo Carlos Sampaio Júnior (20 August 1939 – 9 February 2005), nicknamed Paulistinha, was a Brazilian footballer and manager.

== Playing career ==
=== Club career ===
Paulistinha made his debut for Botafogo on 5 June 1958, in a 6–0 win against Portuguesa-RJ. That same year, he was called up for mandatory military service in Brazil, where he shared a dorm with Flamengo striker Amarildo, who he convinced Botafogo's management to sign.

During the first leg of the 1964 Torneio Rio-São Paulo tiebreaker playoff, Paulistinha was sent off by referee Albino Zanferrari for stalling after receiving a foul. His final match came on 19 July 1969, in a 2–0 win against Campo Grande in the Taça Guanabara. In 1970, he briefly returned to playing football with Botafogo's reserve team. Overall, he played 309 matches for Botafogo, scoring six goals.

=== International career ===
In 1958, Paulistinha was called up by Newton Cardoso to the Brazil under-20 national team for that year's South American U-20 Championship in Chile, where they finished third.

== Managerial career ==
Following his retirement, Paulistinha moved to coaching. In 1972, he helped Sociedade Esportiva Tiradentes win the Campeonato Piauiense title. He was briefly the manager of Botafogo in 1974, and again in 1977, but the 1977 stint saw him only managed two matches, lasting 18 days as manager before being replaced by Danilo Alves. Later that year, he was appointed as the manager of the Ghana national team, although he left the position in 1978.

He was the manager of Saudi Arabia under-20 national team at the 1985 and 1987 FIFA World Youth Championship, before being appointed to the Saudi Arabia national team in 1987.

In 1995, he returned to Ghana as the manager of Goldfields Obuasi.

== Playing style ==
Despite being a full-back, Paulistinha was considered versatile, playing in various positions like center-back, defensive midfielder and even as a forward. He is considered one of the best utility players in the history of Botafogo.

== Personal life and death ==
Paulistinha's wife was from Mexico. He died in Rio de Janeiro on 9 February 2005, at the age of 65. Prior to his death, he had been battling cancer, and had been undergoing treatment at a hospital in Barretos for a considerable amount of time.

== Honours ==
=== Player ===
Botafogo

- Campeonato Carioca: 1961, 1962, 1967, 1968
- Torneio Início Carioca: 1962
- Torneio Rio–São Paulo: 1962, 1964, 1966
- Taça Guanabara: 1967
- Taça Brasil: 1968
- Tournoi de Paris: 1963
- Torneio Quadrangular de Teresina: 1966

=== Manager ===
Tiradentes

- Campeonato Piauiense: 1972
