= Nílton Santos =

Brazilian footballer (1925–2013)

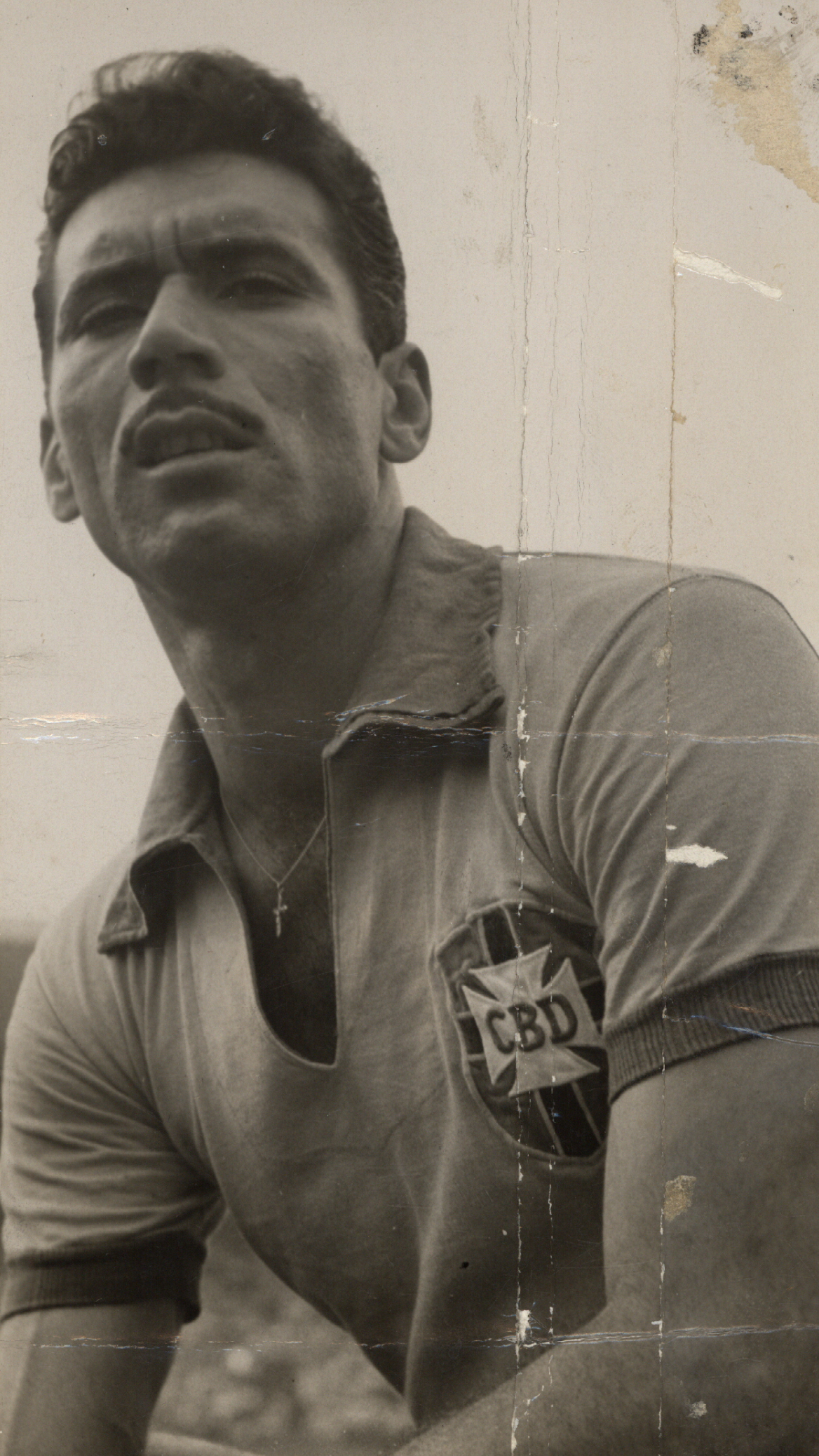
- Santos in 1956

Personal information
- Full name: Nílton dos Santos
- Date of birth: 16 May 1925
- Place of birth: Rio de Janeiro, Brazil
- Date of death: 27 November 2013 (aged 88)
- Place of death: Rio de Janeiro, Brazil
- Height: 1.84 m (6 ft 0 in)
- Position: Left-back

Youth career
- Botafogo

Senior career*
Years	Team	Apps	(Gls)
1948–1964	Botafogo (Note: His numbers in the infobox aren't only league matches and they also include friendly matches.)	723	(11)

International career
1949–1962	Brazil	75	(3)
Medal record
Men's Football
Representing Brazil
FIFA World Cup
Winner	1958 Sweden
Winner	1962 Chile
Runner-up	1950 Brazil
South American Championship
Winner	1949 Brazil
Runner-up	1953 Peru
Runner-up	1957 Peru
Runner-up	1959 Argentina
Panamerican Championship
Winner	1952 Chile
- * Club domestic league appearances and goals

Nílton dos Santos (Brazilian Portuguese: [ˈniwtõ ˈsɐ̃tus]; 16 May 1925 – 27 November 2013) was a Brazilian footballer who played primarily as a left-back. At international level, he was a member of the Brazil teams that won the 1958 and 1962 FIFA World Cups.

Regarded as one of the greatest defenders in the history of the game, Nílton Santos was included in the World Team of the 20th Century, and was named by Pelé in the FIFA 100, a list of the world's greatest living footballers announced at a FIFA awards ceremony in 2004. In 2009, he was the recipient of the Golden Foot Legends Award. He was unrelated to his frequent defensive partner Djalma Santos.

Santos was nicknamed A Enciclopédia ("The Encyclopedia") for his knowledge of football and complete style of play.

== Club career ==
Born in Rio de Janeiro, he was a pioneering attacking left back, being one of the first full backs to make runs down the wing to participate in the offensive game. Once he said: "I have never envied today's players the money but the freedom they have, to go forward".

He played all his professional club career for Botafogo de Futebol e Regatas.

== International career ==
Nílton was a key player in defence during the 1954, 1958 and 1962 World Cup finals (he was also in the Brazilian squad for the 1950 finals, but made no appearances) and became famous for scoring a goal in the 1958 tournament when Brazil played Austria. Dribbling his way through the whole field, he finished with a shot that drove his coach Vicente Feola crazy (he kept on insisting for Nílton to retreat to the defensive field, but was ignored until the goal was scored).

Nílton Santos played for only two teams in his professional career; Botafogo de Futebol e Regatas and the Brazil national team collecting 75 caps and scoring 3 goals.

== Style of play ==
Santos was primarily deployed as a left-back, although he was noted for the breadth of his game and has often been regarded as a precursor to the modern attacking full-back role. At a time when full-backs were generally expected to remain in defensive positions, Santos was recognised for combining defensive solidity with the technical ability and confidence to advance down the left flank. Brian Glanville of The Guardian described him as "tall, powerfully built, elegant and versatile", noting that he was cool under pressure, quick on the turn, a firm tackler, and always ready to surge forward and use his strong left foot.

FIFA described Santos as "Brazil and Botafogo's pioneering wingback". In its profile of him, FIFA highlighted his goal against Austria at the 1958 FIFA World Cup, when he won the ball in his own half, continued his run beyond the halfway line and moved into a position to score. The profile noted that, although full-backs had attacked before, it was in that World Cup match that "the concept of the wingback was born", with the role extending beyond merely defending.

Santos was nicknamed A Enciclopédia ("The Encyclopedia") for his understanding of football and his complete style of play. His ability to defend, read the game and contribute to attacks made him one of the earliest prominent examples of the Brazilian attacking full-back tradition.

== Death ==
Santos died of a lung infection on 27 November 2013, aged 88, in Rio de Janeiro. He was not only the last surviving member of the Brazil 1950 FIFA World Cup squad, but also the fourth 1958 World Cup champion to die in a few months, after Djalma Santos died in July 2013, Gilmar and De Sordi both in August 2013 and all of them within a year of the 2014 FIFA World Cup in their native Brazil.

== Legacy ==
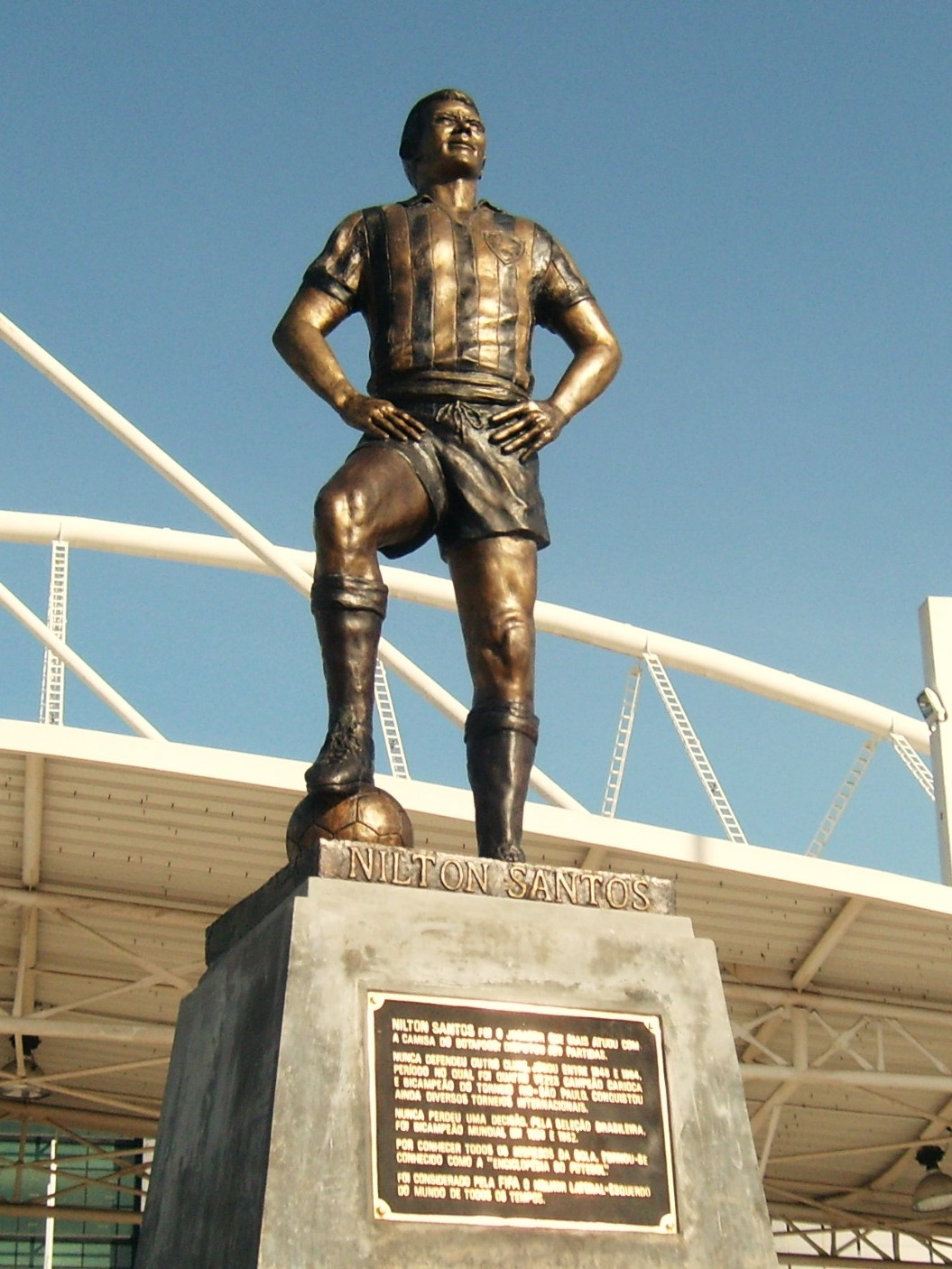
Statue of Nílton Santos outside the stadium named in his honour.

Santos remains closely associated with Botafogo, the only professional club he represented. The club credits him with 723 appearances and 11 goals, and refers to him by his nickname, "A Enciclopédia do Futebol" ("The Football Encyclopedia"). FIFA has also used the nickname in reference to his tactical reading of the game and mastery of his position.

Botafogo's home ground, the Estádio Olímpico Nilton Santos, commonly known as Engenhão, is named in his honour. Built for the 2007 Pan American Games, the stadium became Botafogo's home in 2007 and was used for athletics and football at the 2016 Summer Olympics. At Botafogo's request, the venue's name in use was changed from Estádio Olímpico João Havelange to Estádio Olímpico Nílton Santos in 2015, before the change was made official by the city of Rio de Janeiro in 2017.

== Honours ==
Botafogo

- Campeonato Carioca: 1948, 1957, 1961, 1962
- Torneio Rio – São Paulo 1962, 1964

Rio de Janeiro State Team

- Campeonato Brasileiro de Seleções Estaduais: 1950

Brazil

- FIFA World Cup: 1958, 1962 Runner-up: 1950
- South American Championship: 1949
- Panamerican Championship: 1952
- Taça do Atlântico: 1956, 1960
- Copa Rio Branco: 1950
- Taça Oswaldo Cruz: 1950, 1955, 1956, 1958, 1961, 1962
- Taça Bernado O'Higgins: 1955, 1961

Individual

- Torneio Rio-São Paulo Team of the Tournament: 1955
- FIFA World Cup All-Star Team: 1958
- World Soccer World XI: 1960, 1961
- World Team of the 20th Century: 1998
- FIFA 100: 2004
- Golden Foot: 2009, as a football legend
- IFFHS Brazilian Player of the 20th Century (9th place)
- The Best of The Best – Player of the Century: Top 50
- Brazilian Football Museum Hall of Fame

== See also ==
- List of one-club men in association football
- History of Botafogo de Futebol e Regatas

== Notes ==
World Cup-winners status
Preceded by Ottmar Walter	Oldest living player 16 June – 27 November 2013	Succeeded by Alcides Ghiggia
