= Geninho (disambiguation) =

Geninho may refer to:

- Ephigênio de Freitas Bahiense (1918–1980), Brazilian footballer and manager
- Eugênio Machado Souto (born 1948), Brazilian footballer and manager
- Genivaldo Francisco dos Santos (born 1980), Brazilian footballer
