= Juvenal (footballer, born March 1923) =

Brazilian footballer

Personal information
- Full name: Juvenal Francisco Dias
- Date of birth: 12 March 1923
- Place of birth: Vespasiano, Brazil
- Date of death: 30 August 2012 (aged 89)
- Place of death: Rio de Janeiro, Brazil
- Position: Defender

Youth career
- Paraense EC

Senior career*
Years	Team	Apps	(Gls)
1944–1946	Cruzeiro	73	(0)
1946–1957	Botafogo	384	(12)
- * Club domestic league appearances and goals as of 23 May 2024

Juvenal Francisco Dias (12 March 1923 – 30 August 2012) was a Brazilian professional footballer who played as a defender.

== Career ==
Juvenal started playing football at Paraense EC in the city of Pará de Minas. In professional football he played for Cruzeiro from 1944 to 1946, making 73 appearances and being state champion twice. In 1946 he transferred to Botafogo where he made history, with 386 appearances for the club. After retiring from football at 34, he participated in the construction of the city of Brasília.

== Honours ==
Cruzeiro

- Campeonato Mineiro: 1944, 1945

Botafogo

- Campeonato Carioca: 1948
- Torneio Início: 1947
