= Ephigênio de Freitas =

Brazilian footballer (1918–1980)

Geninho
Personal information
- Full name: Ephigênio de Freitas Bahiense
- Date of birth: 10 September 1918
- Place of birth: Belo Horizonte, Brazil
- Date of death: 21 June 1980 (aged 61)
- Place of death: Rio de Janeiro, Brazil
- Position: Midfielder

Youth career
- Palestra Itália-MG

Senior career*
Years	Team	Apps	(Gls)
1938–1940	Palestra Itália-MG		
1940–1955	Botafogo	442	(115)

Managerial career
- 1949: Botafogo
- 1950: Botafogo
- 1955: Botafogo
- 1956–1957: Botafogo
- 1959–1960: Bahia
- 1962: Palmeiras
- 1962–1963: Cruzeiro
- 1964–1965: Botafogo
- * Club domestic league appearances and goals

Ephigênio de Freitas Bahiense (10 September 1918 – 21 June 1980), also known as Ephigênio de Freitas or by the nickname Geninho, was a Brazilian professional football player and manager, who played as a midfielder.

== Playing career ==
Born in Belo Horizonte, Geninho started with Palestra Itália (now Cruzeiro), defending the club from 1938 to 1940. Nicknamed "architect" for his great ability to distribute balls in play, in September 1940, he was traded to Botafogo, a club he defended until 1955, making 422 appearances and scoring 115 goals.

== Managerial career ==
Geninho, now referred to as Ephigênio de Freitas, managed Botafogo even before retiring on a few occasions. In 1956 he officially took over the team for the first time. He then coached Bahia, becoming state champion and one of the coaches of the 1959 Taça Brasil winning campaign alongside Argentine Carlos Volante. Due to his job as a police officer, he ended up not coaching the team in the final, and returned to Rio de Janeiro the following year. In 1964 he was the champion manager with Botafogo in the Rio-São Paulo Tournament, and also coached Cruzeiro and Palmeiras.

== Personal life ==
Ephigênio served in the Brazilian Expeditionary Force in 1944, interrupting his football career, alongside another Botafogo player (Walter). He embarked for Italy, but only served in medical groups. After retiring as a player in 1955, he became a police officer.

== Honours ==
=== Player ===
Botafogo

- Campeonato Carioca: 1948
- Torneio Início: 1947

=== Manager ===
Bahia

- Campeonato Baiano: 1959

Botafogo

- Torneio Rio-São Paulo: 1964
