= Paulistinha =

Paulistinha can refer to:

- CAP-4 Paulistinha, a type of Brazilian trainer aircraft used during the 1930s and 1940s
- Paulistinha (footballer) (1939–2005), Brazilian footballer and manager
