= Paschoal de Gregório =

Brazilian footballer (1913–1948)

Paschoal
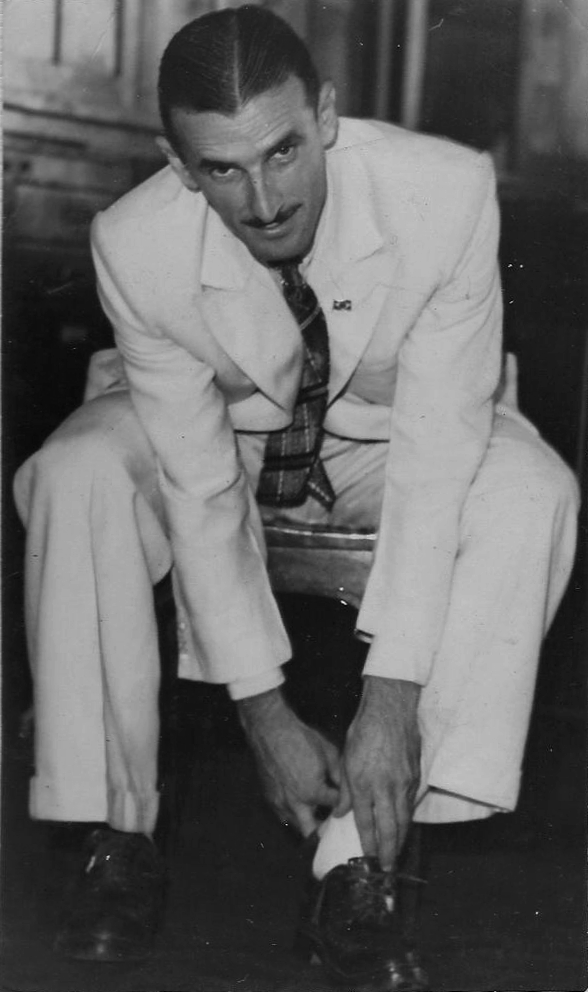
- de Gregório in 1940

Personal information
- Full name: Paschoal de Gregório
- Date of birth: 10 March 1913
- Place of birth: Niterói, Brazil
- Date of death: 6 December 1948 (aged 35)
- Place of death: Niterói, Brazil
- Height: 1.64 m (5 ft 5 in)
- Position: Forward

Youth career
- 5 de Julho
- Canto do Rio

Senior career*
Years	Team	Apps	(Gls)
1937–1943	Botafogo	158	(105)
- * Club domestic league appearances and goals as of 23 May 2024

Paschoal de Gregório (10 March 1913 – 6 December 1948) was a Brazilian professional footballer who played as a forward.

== Career ==
Remarkable for his serious personality and little smile, Paschoal arrived at Botafogo from Canto do Rio. He played 158 games for the club and scored 105 goals. He ended his career after a serious ankle injury, working his last days in the city of Niterói. He died in December 1948 at the age of 35.

== Honours ==
Botafogo

- Torneio Início: 1938
