= Pau Grande =

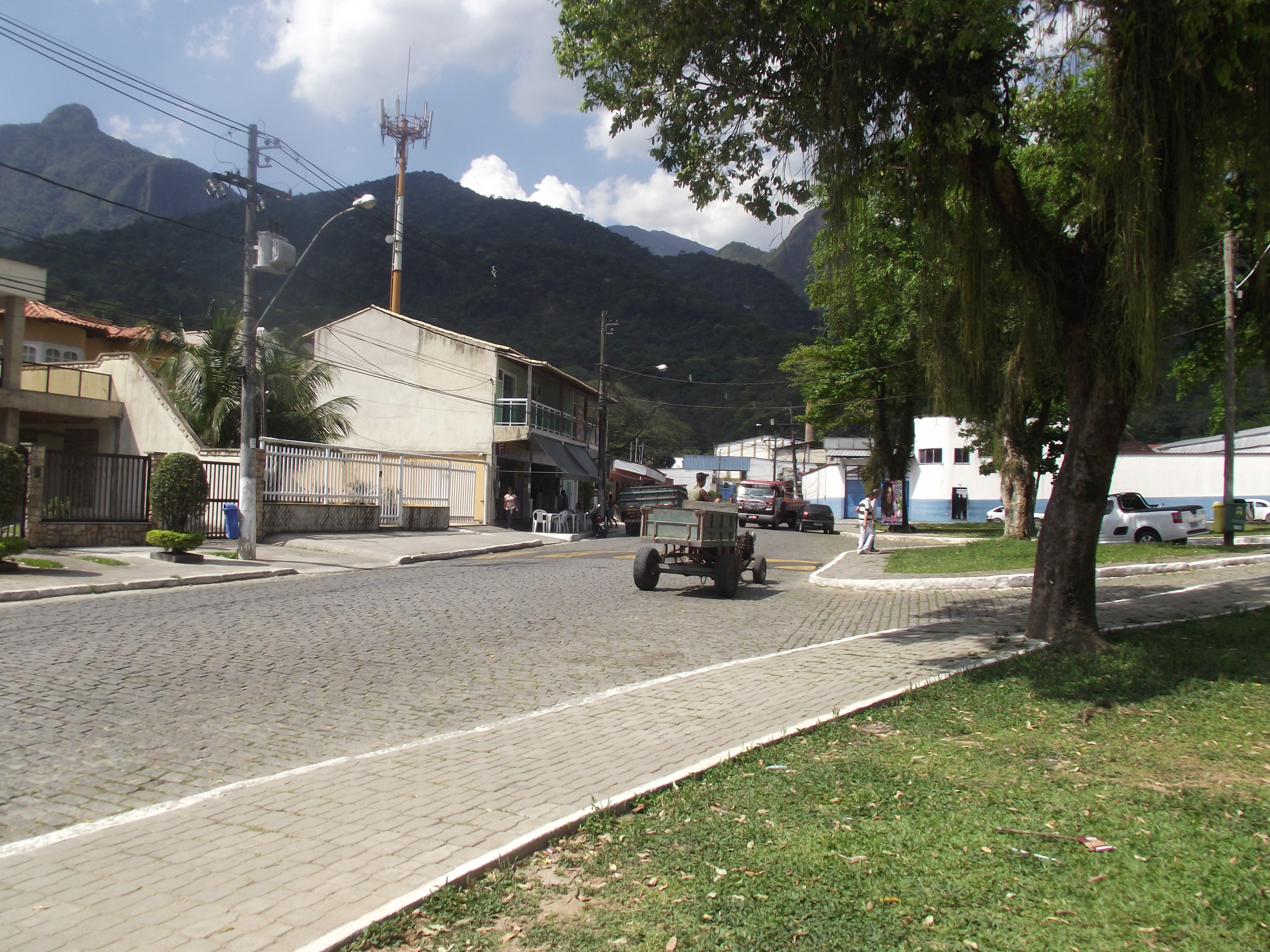

- Location within Brazil
- Coordinates: 22°35′4″S 43°10′11″W
- Country: Brazil
- Region: Southeast
- State: Rio de Janeiro
- Municipality: Magé
- District: Vila Inhomirim
- Time zone: UTC-3
- Website: http://www.mage.rj.gov.br/

Pau Grande is a village from the Vila Inhomirim of the municipality of Magé, in Rio de Janeiro. The name pau grande means "big log" or "big stick" in Portuguese. Pau Grande is located by the Organ Range.

== History ==
By 1848, the land where Pau Grande lays used to belong to four siblings. The district's name comes from one large tree that grew close to the gate of one of the siblings' cottage. On August 11, 1848, three of the owners sold their lands to the former state minister Aureliano de Sousa e Oliveira Coutinho. The fourth part was only sold in 1854. Later the complete land was sold to the Commander Francisco Pinto da Fonseca.

Prior to his death in 1865, the Commander divided the land among his sons, Francisco Pinto da Fonseca Teles and Jacinto Bernardino Pinto da Fonseca. The later received the Pau Grande farm. In 1868, Jacinto Bernardino sold the farm to the American James B. Johnson, which subsequently has transferred it to João Paulo dos Santos Barreto.

In 1877 the farm was sold to Antônio Felício dos Santos, John Sherrington and Francisco José Pedro Lessa. These three businessmen constructed there a branch of the Companhia América Fabril, a pool of fabric factories that existed in many municipalities in Rio de Janeiro. The factory in Pau Grande, due to its geographical isolation, employed mainly rural workers. The incoming workers created the village Pau Grande.

Pau Grande is the birthplace of international footballer Mané Garrincha, who played as a youth for Esporte Clube Pau Grande.
