= Mendonça (footballer, born 1956) =

Brazilian footballer

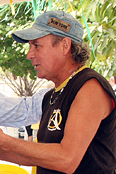

Personal information
- Full name: Mílton da Cunha Mendonça
- Date of birth: 23 May 1956
- Place of birth: Rio de Janeiro, Brazil
- Date of death: 5 July 2019 (aged 63)
- Place of death: Rio de Janeiro, Brazil
- Height: 1.77 m (5 ft 10 in)
- Position: Midfielder

Senior career*
Years	Team	Apps	(Gls)
1975–1982	Botafogo	342	(118)
1983–1985	Portuguesa	111	(33)
1985–1987	Palmeiras	106	(19)
1987–1988	Santos	110	(28)
1989	Inter de Limeira		
1990	Al Sadd		
1990	Bangu		
1991	Ponte Preta		
1991	XV de Piracicaba		
1991	São Bento		
1991	Grêmio	4	(1)
1992	Inter de Santa Maria		
1992–1993	Fortaleza		
1993–1994	América de Natal		
1994	CRAC		
1995–1996	Barra Mansa		
1997	Mesquita		
- * Club domestic league appearances and goals as of 27 November 2023

Mílton da Cunha Mendonça (23 May 1956 – 5 July 2019), better known as Mendonça, was a Brazilian professional footballer who played as a midfielder.

== Career ==
A midfielder with enormous skill, Mendonça stood out in practically every club he played at, especially at Botafogo where he is considered one of the main players in the club's history. He made more than 300 appearances for the club, and more than 100 appearances for Portuguesa, Palmeiras and Santos. He continued his career in the 90s, but at less prominent clubs, retiring in 1997.

== Internacional career ==
Mendonça was part of the Brazil national team squad that competed in the 1983 Copa América and was runners-up.

== Honours ==
Botafogo

- Torneio Início Carioca: 1977

== Death ==
Mendonça felt ill and suffered a fall at a train station in Rio de Janeiro. He was hospitalized for about 2 months and died of ceps. The player had had a problem with alcoholism throughout his life.
