= Esporte Clube Pau Grande =

Brazilian sports club

Pau Grande
- Full name: Esporte Clube Pau Grande
- Founded: August 11, 1908; 117 years ago
- Ground: Mané Garrincha
- Capacity: 1,000
- President: José Renato
- League: Campeonato Carioca - 3rd Division
- Website: https://esporteclubepaugrande.blogspot.com/
Home colours	Away colours

Esporte Clube Pau Grande is a sports club from Pau Grande, a district of Magé, in Rio de Janeiro. It was founded on August 11, 1908 by workers of a local fabric factory, owned by Englishmen. E.C. Pau Grande is famous for being the first football club of the Brazilian football star Garrincha.
