= Saulzinho =

Brazilian footballer

Personal information
- Full name: Saul Santos Silva
- Date of birth: 31 October 1937
- Place of birth: Bagé, Brazil
- Date of death: 25 July 2023 (aged 85)
- Place of death: Florianópolis, Brazil
- Position: Forward

Senior career*
Years	Team	Apps	(Gls)
1954–1960	Guarany de Bagé		
1961–1965	Vasco da Gama		
1966	Guarany de Bagé		

International career
1966	Brazil	2	(0)
- * Club domestic league appearances and goals as of 29 February 2024

Saul Santos Silva (31 October 1937 – 25 July 2023), better known as Saulzinho, was a Brazilian professional footballer who played as a forward.

== Career ==
Saulzinho began his career with Guarany de Bagé, a team for which he scored 101 goals from 1954 to 1960. In 1961 he was signed by Vasco da Gama, being top scorer in the state in 1961 and winning some friendly tournaments. He returned to Guarany where he ended his career in 1966. He was part of the Gaucho squad led by Carlos Froner that represented the Brazil national team in the 1966 Copa Bernardo O'Higgins.

== Honours ==
Guarany de Bagé

- Campeonato Citadino de Bagé: 1956

Vasco da Gama

- Torneio Internacional da Cidade do México: 1963
- Troféu Quarto Centenário da Cidade do Rio de Janeiro: 1965

Brazil

- Copa Bernardo O'Higgins: 1966

Individual

- 1962 Campeonato Carioca top scorer: 18 goals

== Death ==
Saulzinho died in Florianópolis, on 25 July 2023, after suffering a stroke.
