= Botafogo FR =

Association football club in Brazil

Botafogo
- Full name: Botafogo de Futebol e Regatas
- Nicknames: Fogo (Fire); Fogão (Stove/Big Fire); Estrela Solitária (The Lone Star); O Glorioso (The Glorious One); Alvinegro Carioca (Rio's Black and White); O Mais Tradicional (The Most Traditional)
- Founded: 1 July 1894, (rowing club); 1 July 1904, (football club); 8 December 1942, (fusion)
- Ground: Estádio Olímpico Nilton Santos
- Capacity: 46,831
- SAF Owner: Eagle Football Holdings (90%)
- President: João Paulo Magalhães Lins
- Head coach: Tite
- League: Campeonato Brasileiro Série A Campeonato Carioca
- 2025 2025: Série A, 6th of 20; Carioca, 9th of 12
- Website: botafogo.com.br
Home colors	Away colors	Third colors

Botafogo de Futebol e Regatas ([bɔtaˈfoɡu dʒi futʃiˈbɔw i ʁeˈɡatas]); English: Botafogo of Football and Rowing) is a Brazilian football club based in the neighborhood of Botafogo, in the city of Rio de Janeiro. It plays in the Campeonato Brasileiro Série A, the top tier of the Brazilian football league system, and in the Campeonato Carioca, the state of Rio de Janeiro's premier state league. It has played its home matches at the Estádio Olímpico Nilton Santos since 2007, with a capacity of 46,831 spectators.

Botafogo was founded through the merger of two clubs: Club de Regatas Botafogo (a rowing club) and Botafogo Football Club. Although it competes in a number of different sports, Botafogo is mostly known for its association football team. In Brazil, Botafogo is the oldest multi-sport club and the seventh-oldest to play football.

The club is one of the biggest clubs in Brazilian football and is among the Big Twelve. Botafogo won 21 state league titles and three national league titles (1968, 1995 and 2024). At an international level, the club won the Copa Libertadores in 2024, and the Copa CONMEBOL in 1993. In addition, the Botafogo has some of Brazilian football's most notable records, including most unbeaten matches: 52 games between 1977 and 1978; the most unbeaten matches in the Brazilian league: 42, also between 1977 and 1978; and the most players called up to the Brazil national team in World Cups. The club holds the record for the greatest victory ever recorded in Brazilian football: 24–0 against Mangueira in 1909.

In 2000, Botafogo finished 12th in a vote by subscribers of FIFA Magazine for the FIFA Club of the Century. In 2024, Botafogo was ranked 5th in the world in the IFFHS Men's Club World Ranking, making it the highest-ranked club from South America. In 2025, the club qualified for the FIFA Club World Cup and pulled off a major upset by defeating European champions Paris Saint-Germain 1–0 in the group stage, advancing to the knockout rounds. Botafogo was also named as one of five finalists for the 2025 Ballon d’Or Men’s Club of the Year award, being the only non-European club in the category.

== History ==
=== Formation and merger ===
On 1 July 1894, the Club de Regatas Botafogo was founded in Rio de Janeiro as a rowing club.

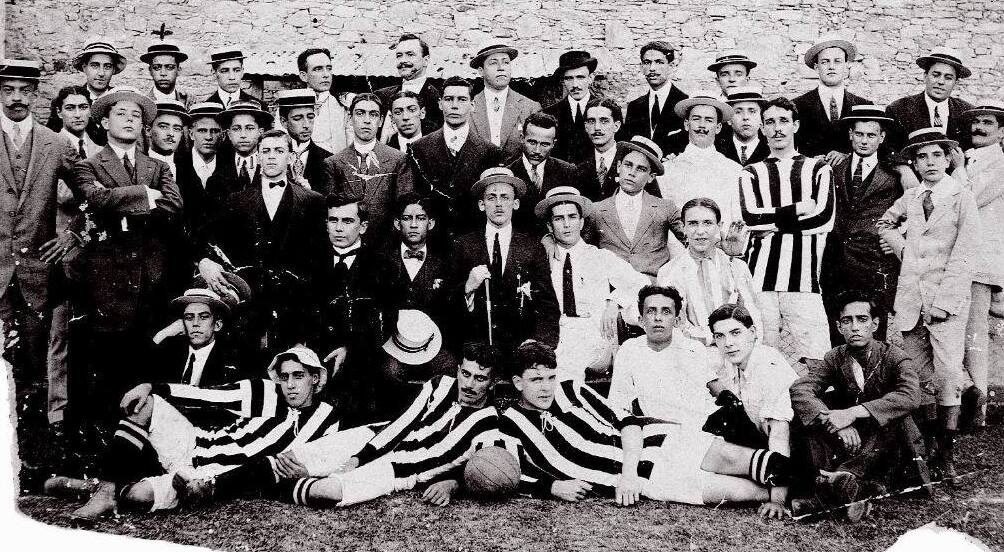
The founders of Botafogo football team.

On 12 August 1904, another club was founded in the neighborhood: the Electro Club, the name first given to the Botafogo Football Club. The idea came during an algebra lesson at Alfredo Gomes College. The Electro Club was founded, but its name did not last. After a suggestion from Dona Chiquitota, Flávio's grandmother, the club finally became the Botafogo Football Club, on its 18 September. The colors were black and white like those of Juventus FC, (who took the colours from Notts County F.C., the oldest professional football team in the world.) the team of Itamar Tavares, one of the club's founders. Its badge was drawn by Basílio Vianna Jr., in Swiss style with the BFC monogram. The Botafogo Football Club would soon become one of the strongest football teams in Rio de Janeiro, winning the championships of 1907, 1910, 1912 and more.

With the same name, the same location, the same colours and most importantly the same supporters, it seemed inevitable that the clubs would merge. They did so on 8 December 1942, after a basketball match between both clubs, when the Botafogo Football Club player Armando Albano died suddenly, that the idea of a merger began. On this tragic occasion, the president of the Club de Regatas Botafogo, Augusto Frederico Schmidt, spoke: "At this time, I declare to Albano that his last match ended with the victory of his team. We won't play the time left on the clock. We all want the young fighter to leave this great night as a winner. This is how we salute him." Eduardo Góis Trindade, the president of the Botafogo Football Club said: "Between the matches of our clubs, only one can be the winner: Botafogo!." And then Schmidt declared the fusion: "What else do we need for our clubs to become one?." The Botafogo de Futebol e Regatas finally came into being. The Football Club's badge became black, and the monogram substituted by the Clube de Regatas' lone star.

=== On the field ===
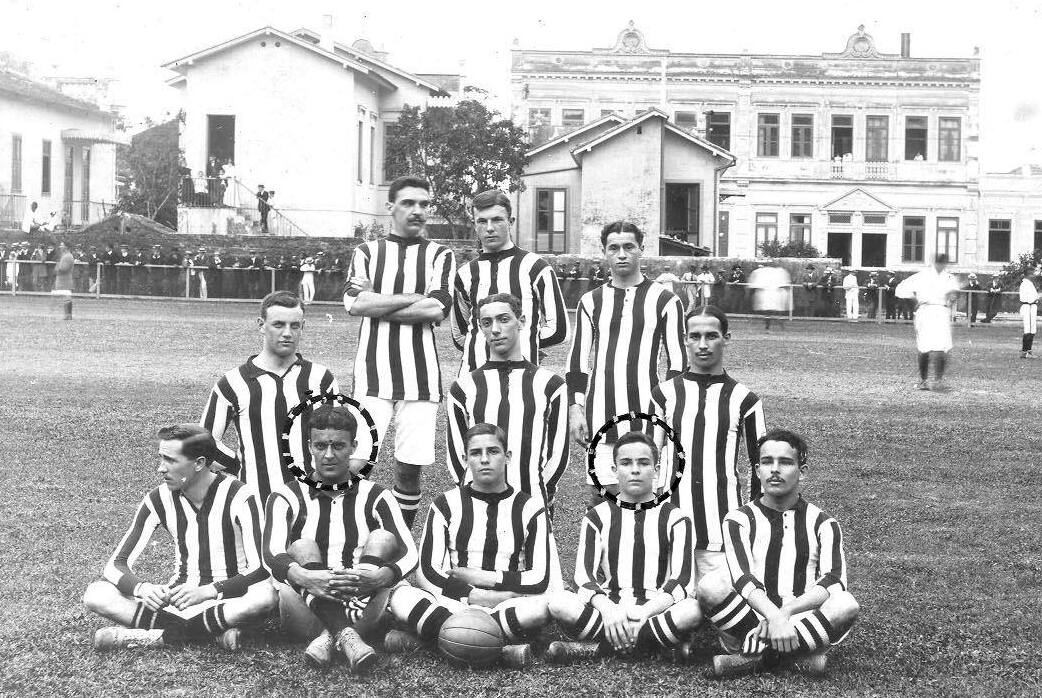
Early 20th-century photo

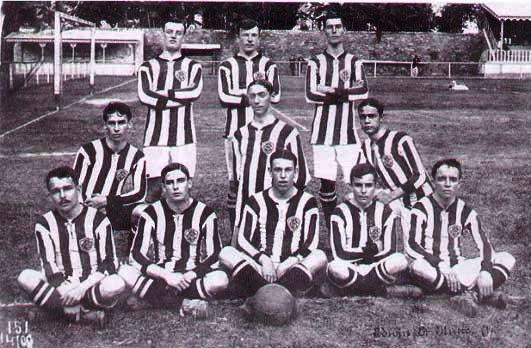
The team in 1910

The team won the Campeonato Carioca in 1907, 1910 and 1912. In 1909 the team beat Mangueira 24–0, which remains the highest score in Brazilian football. They won further state titles in 1930, 1932, 1933, 1934 and 1935.

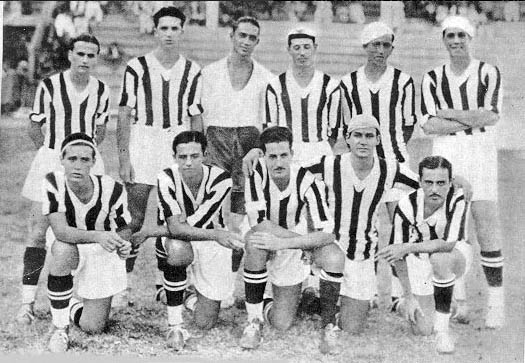
In 1930 Botafogo won its 4th Carioca title.

In the 1940s, after the creation of the Botafogo de Futebol e Regatas, the team's best player was Heleno de Freitas. However, Heleno did not win a championship for Botafogo. He scored 204 goals in 233 matches, but went to the Boca Juniors in 1948, the year Botafogo won its 9th state championship.

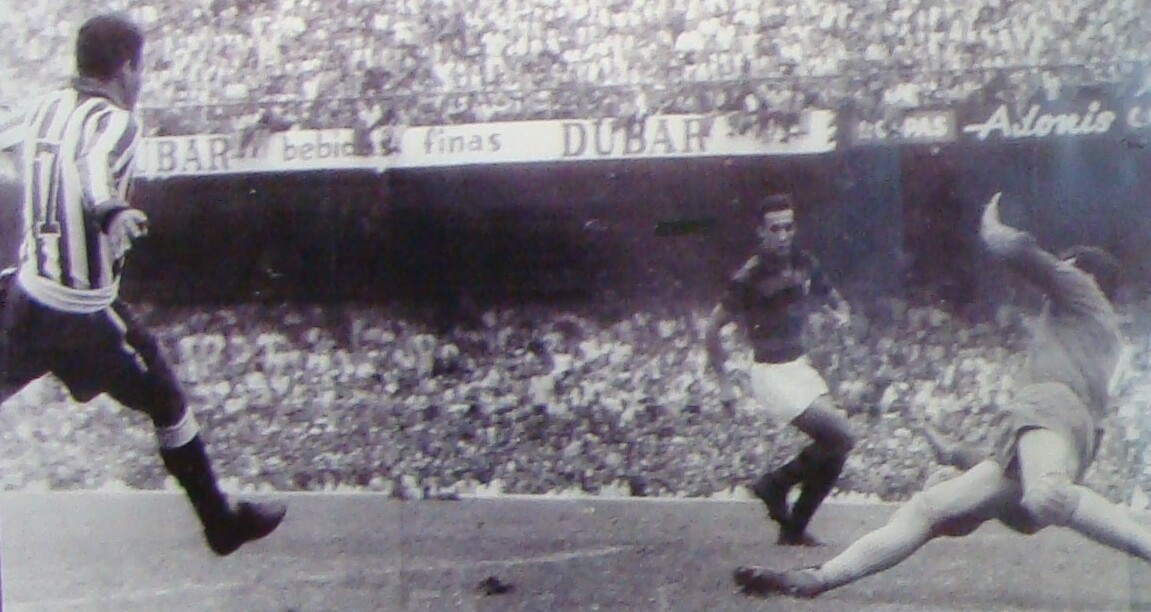
Garrincha, Joy of the people

They won the Campeonato Carioca in 1957, 1961 and 1962, and in 1968 they won Serie A, becoming the first carioca club to win the Brazilian league.

1989 ended a period of 21 years without a title when the club won the state championship, retaining the trophy in 1990.

In the 1990s, Botafogo won Copa Conmebol (the precursor of the current Copa Sudamericana). And in 1995 they won the Brazilian League for the second time in club's history, after drawing 1–1 the second leg of the Final against Santos FC at São Paulo.

Botafogo would be relegated to the Second Division after ranking last in the Brazilian League of 2002. In 2003, Botafogo ranked second in Brazil's Second division (after Palmeiras) and returned to the First Division.

In 2006, the club won the Rio de Janeiro State Championship for the 18th time, and again in 2010 and 2013 with the iconic players Loco Abreu and Clarence Seedorf, respectively.

In the 2020 edition of the Série A, Botafogo performed poorly and ended the championship in the last position, causing the club's relegation to the Série B for their third time in history.

Nowadays, Botafogo is the only club to have won titles in three different centuries, including the state championship for rowing in 1899.

=== The SAF Era ===
At the beginning of 2020, Botafogo underwent a series of internal audits to spin off its football division as a for-profit corporate entity, owned by the club, but which could be portioned and sold to investors. This was due to unprecedented legislation allowing for football clubs to be operated as corporations, and would be a solution to the severe financial crisis the club had faced for decades. Relegation to the Série B, however, delayed these plans.

2021 saw Botafogo's debt reach one billion real. They placed 6th in the Rio de Janeiro State Championship, after a penalty decision lost to the also relegated Vasco da Gama. The club was off to a middling start to the Série B season, but bounced back after the hiring of manager Enderson Moreira, who was able to bring Botafogo back to the top tier of Brazilian football, as champions of the 2021 edition of Série B. It was Botafogo's second Série B title.

Meanwhile, the incoming administration had begun internal restructuring, hiring executive Jorge Braga for the brand-new post of CEO and downsizing its workforce considerably. Botafogo entered into a partnership with the investment firm XP Inc. to seek out potential buyers for its football division, which was in the process of becoming its own corporate entity. Congress had recently passed the Sociedade Anônima de Futebol (SAF) law, allowing foreigners to purchase shares in Brazilian football clubs for the first time in history.

Having averted complete financial disaster by returning to Série A, the country's top competitive tier, Botafogo finalized its transition into the SAF legal structure. The social club remained as an entity, owning 100% of Botafogo SAF's shares. In January 2022, it came to light that American investor John Textor, owner of a majority stake in Premier League club Crystal Palace F.C., was in talks to purchase a majority share of Botafogo. In February 2022, the club announced the acquisition of 90% of the shares of Botafogo's football division by Textor's holding company Eagle Holdings and the start of a new era for the club.

Textor's first major move in charge of the club was the dismissal of Enderson Moreira in favor of Portuguese manager Luís Castro. Castro signed with Botafogo in March 2022, and the team had to hurry to build their squad for the 2022 Campeonato Brasileiro. Botafogo finished that year's league edition in 11th place, guaranteeing a spot in the 2023 Copa Sudamericana.

At the 2023 Campeonato Brasileiro, Botafogo, then thought of as a team that at most would fight for a spot in the top 6, shocked everyone by coming in first place after only 3 rounds, then leading the league by 13 points after 19 matches and on course to have the greatest first half of a season in Brazilian football history. In June 2023, coach Luís Castro accepted an offer from Al Nassr of the Saudi Pro League, paving the way for the arrival of Portuguese manager Bruno Lage. However, due to poor results and controversies, Lage was dismissed after about 3 months. For the remainder of the 2023 season, with the coaching position vacant, Botafogo's SAF leadership decided to promote two fan favorites to key positions in the team's management: a former coach of Botafogo's U-23 team, Lúcio Flávio, was appointed interim coach, with former Argentine defender Joel Carli as his assistant.

Constant change of managers caused Botafogo to have the biggest title collapse in football history, as the team won only 2 of their last 17 fixtures, not only losing the title to Palmeiras but dropping to 5th in the table and losing the automatic qualification spot for the Copa Libertadores. A round of 16 exit in the Copa do Brasil, a quarterfinal exit in the Copa Sudamericana, and a disappointing Campeonato Carioca made the year one of the most painful seasons in the club's history.

The total debt owned by the club has been reduced and now sits at around 730 million reais.

In 2024, under Portuguese manager Artur Jorge, Botafogo rebounded from the previous season's collapse to win both major competitions it contested. On 30 November, the club won the Copa Libertadores for the first time, defeating Atlético Mineiro 3–1 in the final at the Estadio Monumental in Buenos Aires despite playing with ten men from the opening minute after Gregore was sent off 30 seconds into the match. Eight days later, Botafogo defeated São Paulo 2–1 to win the 2024 Campeonato Brasileiro Série A, its third Brazilian championship and first since 1995. The club finished the season with 79 points, six ahead of runners-up Palmeiras, completing the first Copa Libertadores–Brazilian league double in its history.

== Stadium ==
The team's home ground is the Estádio Olímpico Nilton Santos, named in honor of Nilton Santos, a former club player and two-time world champion with the Brazil national football team, regarded as one of the greatest left-backs of all time. The stadium is commonly called Engenhão by fans, in reference to the neighbourhood of Engenho de Dentro, where it is located. The stadium was built for the 2007 Pan American Games and it also hosted the 2016 Summer Olympics.

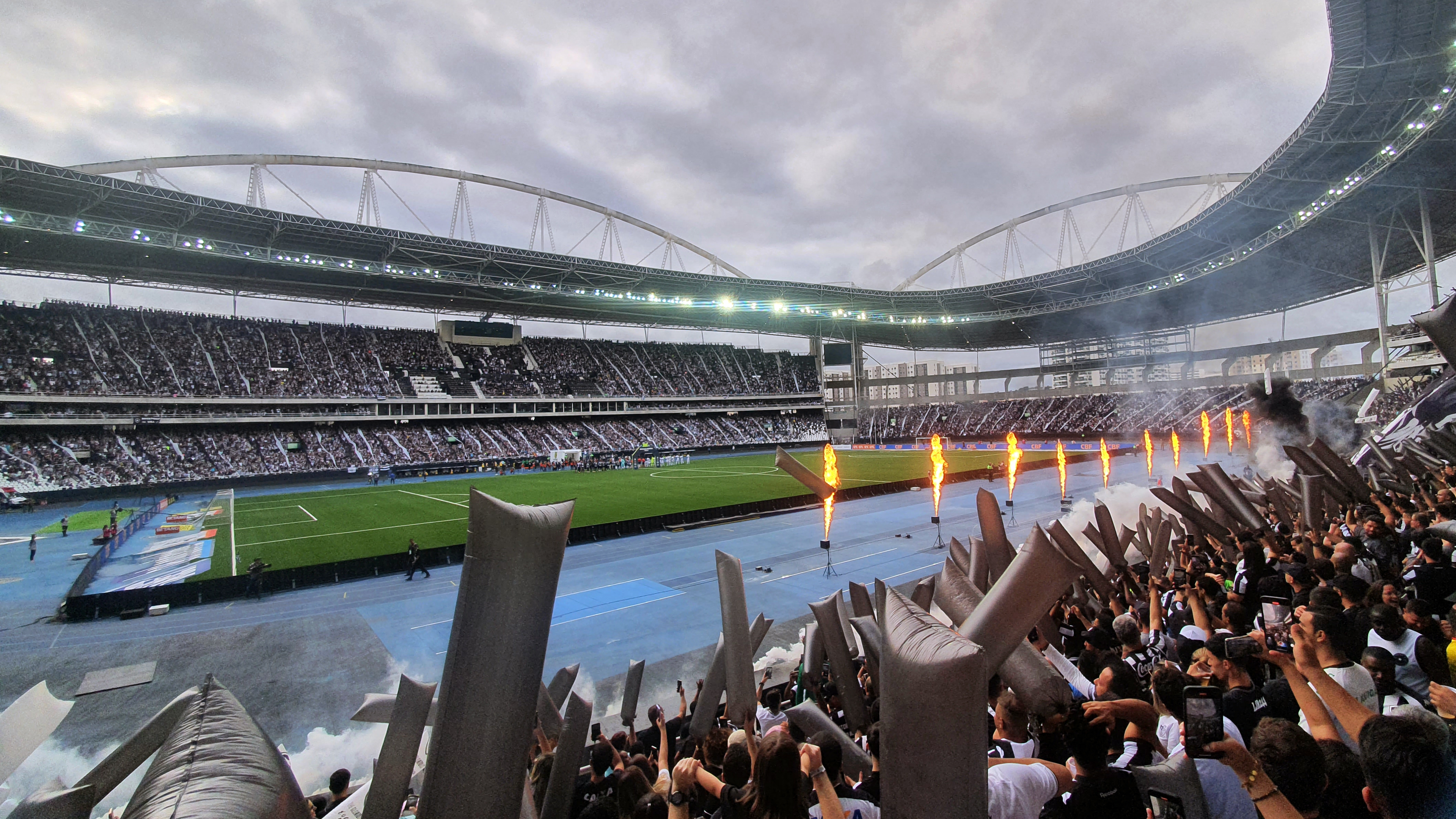
Estádio Olímpico Nilton Santos, home of Botafogo

Other stadiums used by the club during its history are:

- Maracanã Stadium, 1950-2007
- Voluntários da Pátria Street Field, the club's first pitch at their neighborhood of origin.
- Estádio General Severiano, the club's first own stadium.(1913-1974)
- Marechal Hermes Stadium, for less important matches during 1978–1986.
- Estádio Caio Martins, at the neighboring city of Niterói. (1990-2004)
- Estádio Luso Brasileiro, during the 2005 and 2016 seasons.

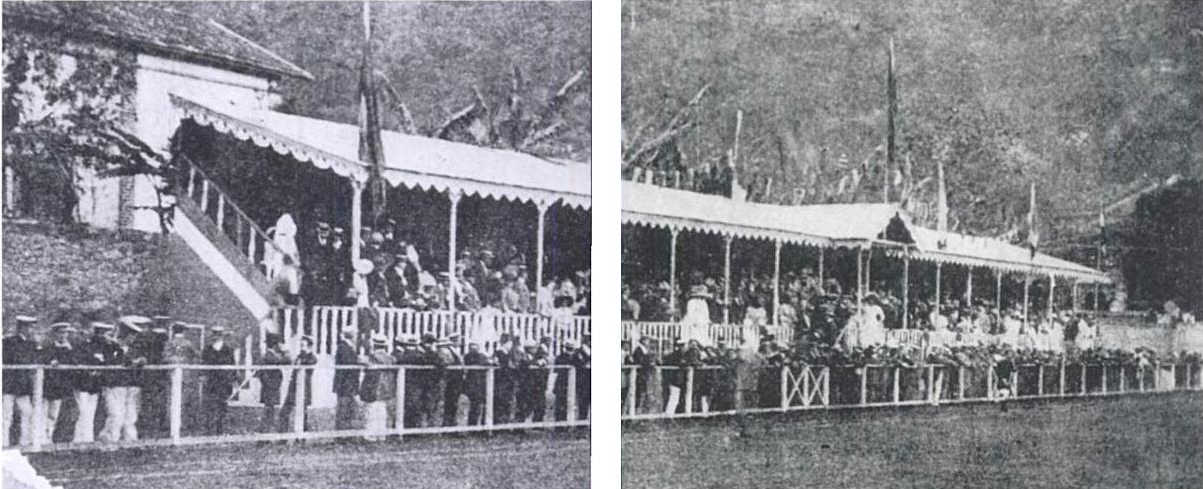
Voluntários da Pátria Street Stadium (1909)

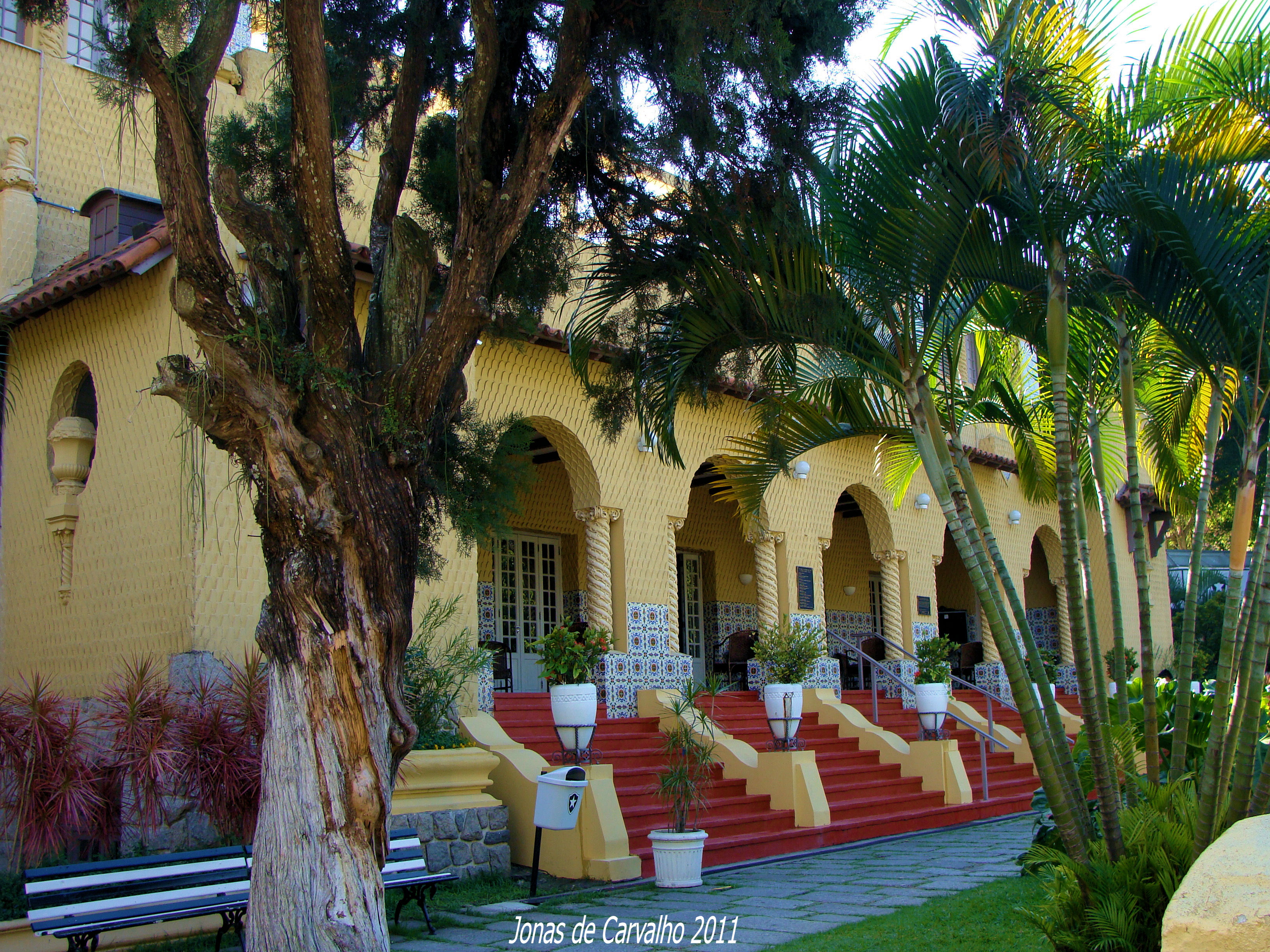

== Rivalries ==
Historically, Botafogo biggest rivalries are with the other three clubs that, along with it, make up the Big Four of Rio de Janeiro: Flamengo, Fluminense, and Vasco da Gama.

The rivalry against Fluminense is the oldest classic between major clubs in Brazil, and the third oldest in the Americas. The two teams have faced each other since 1905, which is why it's called the Clássico Vovô (Grandpa Derby). The duel against Flamengo became known as the Clássico da Rivalidade (Rivalry Derby) since they started facing each other in rowing before football. The clashes against Vasco da Gama do not have a unanimous name among the two fan bases, being called the Clássico da Amizade (Friendship Derby) by the media.

From outside the city, the club also has a historic rivalry with Santos FC since the 1960s, because it brought together on the field two of the greatest players of their time, Pelé and Garrincha.

== Mascots ==
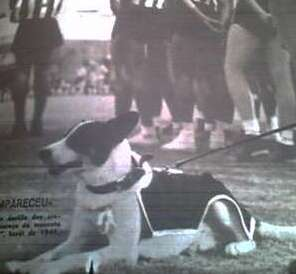
Biriba in 1940s, the mascot that really existed

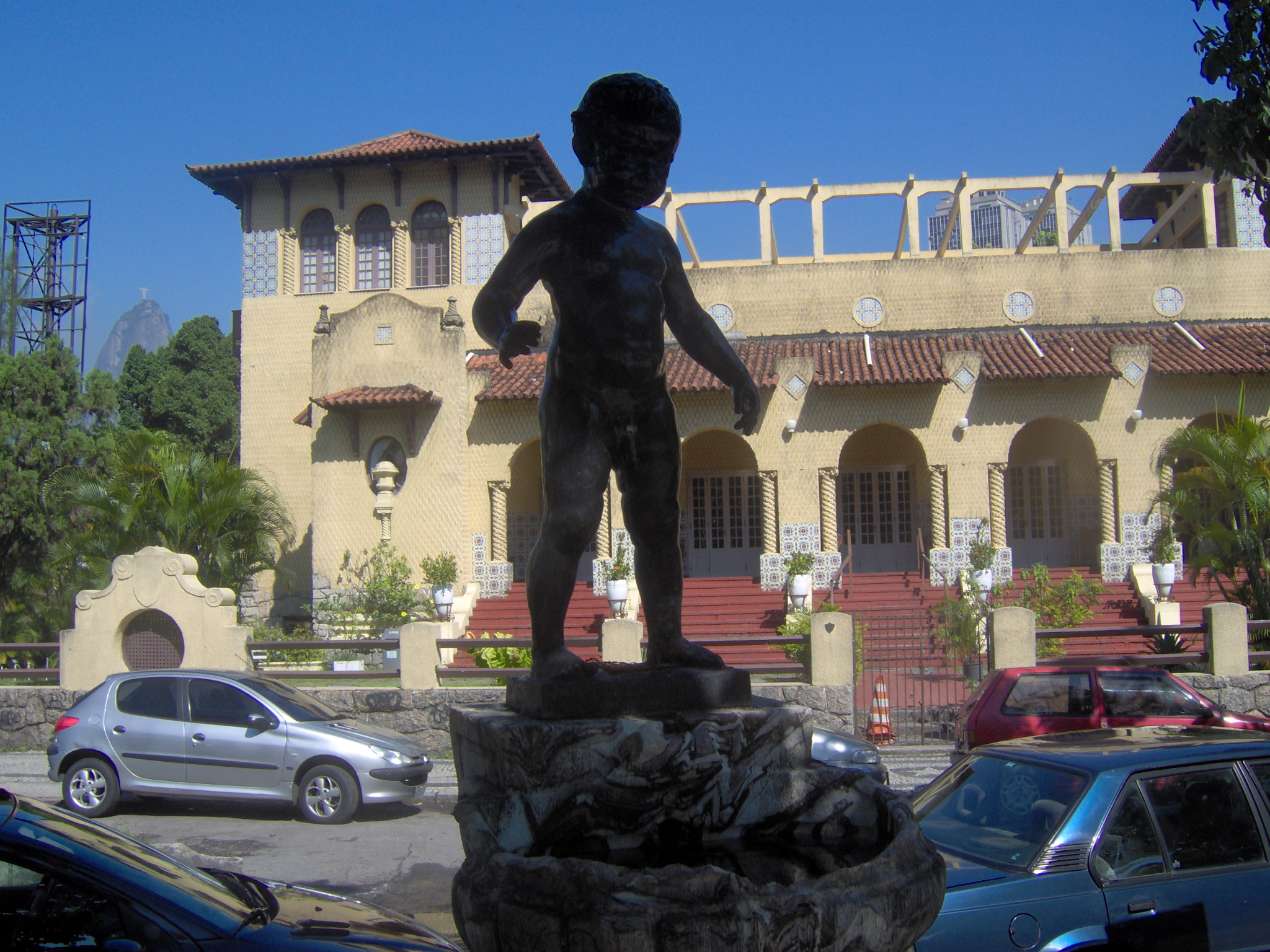
Manequinho, one of the mascots of the club

The dog Biriba is one the most traditional mascots of Botafogo, in 1948 this real stray dog, known for invading the field, was the mascot that led them to the Campeonato Carioca title. Another Botafogo's mascot is Manequinho, an urinating boy originating from a replica of Brussels' Manneken Pis statue that stands near Botafogo's headquarters, which on occasion had a Botafogo jersey put onto by supporters of the team. The first mascot was Donald Duck, who cartoonist Lorenzo Mollas drew in the early 1940s wearing Botafogo's jersey, but it was never officially adopted due to rights issues.

== Honours ==
The club has some of Brazilian football's top records, including most unbeaten matches: 52 games between 1977 and 1978, most unbeaten games in the Brazilian Championship: 42, also between 1977 and 1978, most player participations in total matches of the Brazil national team (considering official and unofficial games): 1,094 participations, and the most players assigned to the Brazil national team for the World Cup.

=== Official tournaments ===
Continental
Competitions	Titles	Seasons
Copa Libertadores	1	2024
Copa CONMEBOL	1	1993
National
Competitions	Titles	Seasons
Campeonato Brasileiro Série A	3	1968, 1995, 2024
Campeonato Brasileiro Série B	2	2015, 2021
Inter-state
Competitions	Titles	Seasons
Torneio Rio–São Paulo	4	1962, 1964, 1966, 1998
State
Competitions	Titles	Seasons
Campeonato Carioca	21	1907, 1910, 1912, 1930, 1932, 1933, 1934, 1935, 1948, 1957, 1961, 1962, 1967, 1968, 1989, 1990, 1997, 2006, 2010, 2013, 2018

=== Runners-up ===
- Recopa Sudamericana (2): 1994, 2025
- Derby of the Americas (1): 2024
- Campeonato Brasileiro Série A (3): 1962, 1972, 1992
- Copa do Brasil (1): 1999
- Supercopa do Brasil (1): 2025
- Campeonato Brasileiro Série B (1): 2003
- Torneio Rio–São Paulo (3): 1960, 1961, 2001
- Campeonato Carioca (21): 1908, 1909, 1913, 1914, 1916, 1918, 1939, 1942, 1944, 1945, 1946, 1947, 1959, 1971, 1975, 2007, 2008, 2009, 2012, 2015, 2016

=== Youth team ===
- Campeonato Brasileiro Sub-20 (1): 2016
- Taça Belo Horizonte de Juniores (1): 1999
- Copa Macaé de Juvenis (1): 1997

=== Awards ===
- Fita Azul (1): 1965

Fita Azul do Futebol Brasileiro (Brazilian Football Blue Ribbon) was an award given for the club which succeeds in an excursion out of the country.

== Players ==
=== Current squad ===
As of 22 September 2026.

Note: Flags indicate national team as defined under FIFA eligibility rules; some limited exceptions apply. Players may hold more than one non-FIFA nationality.

No.	Pos.	Nation	Player
2	DF	BRA	Vitinho
3	DF	BRA	Arthur Chaves (on loan from Hoffenheim 1899)
4	DF	URU	Mateo Ponte
5	DF	VEN	Nahuel Ferraresi
6	MF	ARG	Cristian Medina
7	FW	BRA	Júnior Santos (on loan from Atlético Mineiro)
8	MF	BRA	Danilo Santos
9	FW	BRA	Tiquinho Soares
10	MF	ARG	Álvaro Montoro
11	FW	BRA	Matheus Martins
12	GK	BRA	Gabriel Batista
13	DF	BRA	Alex Telles (captain)
14	MF	COL	Jordan Barrera
17	GK	BRA	Warleson
19	FW	BRA	Arthur Cabral
21	DF	BRA	Marçal

No.	Pos.	Nation	Player
22	FW	MAR	Hakim Ziyech
25	MF	BRA	Allan
26	DF	BRA	Anthony
29	DF	BRA	Paulinho
31	DF	BRA	Kaio Pantaleão
33	DF	URU	Lucas Monzón
34	DF	BRA	Gabriel Justino
37	FW	PAN	Kadir Barría
42	DF	BRA	Kadu (on loan from Remo)
59	FW	BRA	Kauan Toledo
75	MF	BRA	Huguinho
77	FW	URU	Lucas Villalba
79	FW	BRA	Lucas Emanuel
88	MF	BRA	Edenilson
90	FW	BRA	Danilo Pereira (on loan from Rangers)
91	MF	ANG	Domingos Andrade

=== Botafogo B and Youth Academy ===
Note: Flags indicate national team as defined under FIFA eligibility rules; some limited exceptions apply. Players may hold more than one non-FIFA nationality.

No.	Pos.	Nation	Player
32	GK	BRA	Rhyan Luca
36	DF	BRA	Gabriel Abdias (on loan from Ituano)
39	FW	BRA	Arthur Izaque
40	GK	ECU	Cristhian Loor
44	DF	BRA	Riquelme
45	MF	BRA	Caio Valle
47	MF	BRA	Miguel Caldas
48	MF	BRA	Arthur Novaes
49	FW	BRA	Felipe Januário

No.	Pos.	Nation	Player
55	MF	BRA	Wallace Davi
57	FW	BRA	Matheusinho
62	GK	BRA	Cléber Lucas
63	DF	BRA	Herick
64	DF	BRA	Marquinhos
67	DF	COL	Jhoan Hernández (on loan from Millonarios)
68	MF	BRA	Davi Nery
80	MF	BRA	Bernardo Valim

=== Other players under contract ===
Note: Flags indicate national team as defined under FIFA eligibility rules; some limited exceptions apply. Players may hold more than one non-FIFA nationality.

No.	Pos.	Nation	Player
—	DF	BRA	Kawan

=== Out on loan ===
Note: Flags indicate national team as defined under FIFA eligibility rules; some limited exceptions apply. Players may hold more than one non-FIFA nationality.

No.	Pos.	Nation	Player
—	GK	BRA	Léo Linck (to Estrela da Amadora until 30 June 2027)
—	MF	BRA	JP Galvão (to Paysandu until 30 November 2026)
—	MF	BRA	Kauan Lindes (to Athletic-MG until 30 November 2026)
—	MF	BRA	Patrick de Paula (to Remo until 31 December 2026)
—	FW	BRA	Artur (to São Paulo until 31 December 2026)
—	FW	BRA	Jeffinho (to Liaoning Tieren until 31 December 2026)

No.	Pos.	Nation	Player
—	FW	BRA	Kayke (to Kawasaki Frontale until 30 June 2027)
—	FW	BRA	Nathan Fernandes (to Ludogorets Razgrad until 30 June 2027)
—	FW	ESP	Chris Ramos (to Oviedo until 30 June 2027)
—	FW	BRA	Rwan Cruz (to Ludogorets Razgrad until 30 June 2027)
—	FW	PAR	Matías Segovia (to América Mineiro until 30 November 2026)

== Records ==
World Best Players
#	Name	Year
1.	(Brazil) Didi	1958
2.	(Brazil) Garrincha	1962

World Cup Champions
#	Name	Year
1.	(Brazil) Nílton Santos	1958, 1962
2.	(Brazil) Didi	1958, 1962
3.	(Brazil) Garrincha	1958, 1962
4.	(Brazil) Amarildo	1962
5.	(Brazil) Zagallo	1962
6.	(Brazil) Jairzinho	1970
7.	(Brazil) Paulo Cezar Caju	1970
8.	(Brazil) Roberto Miranda	1970

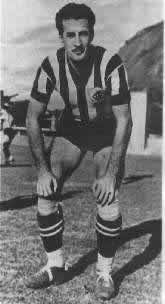
Carvalho Leite, one of the greatest players of the 1930s and the 2nd. topscorer in club history with 261 goals.

Most appearances
#	Name	Matches	Goals	Year
1.	(Brazil) Nílton Santos	723	11	1948–64
2.	(Brazil) Garrincha	612	243	1953–65
3.	(Brazil) Jefferson	459	*	2003–2005 and 2009–2018
4.	(Brazil) Valtencir	453	6	1967–76
5.	(Brazil) Quarentinha	444	306	1954–64
6.	(Brazil) Manga	442	*	1959–68
7.	(Brazil) Carlos Roberto	442	15	1967–76
8.	(Brazil) Geninho	422	115	1940–54
9.	(Brazil) Jairzinho	413	186	1962–74, 1981
10.	(Brazil) Wágner	412	*	1993–02
11.	(Brazil) Osmar	387	4	1970–79
12.	(Brazil) Juvenal	384	12	1946–57
13.	(Brazil) Gérson dos Santos	371	2	1945–56
14.	(Brazil) Wilson Gottardo	354	13	1987–90, 1994–96
15.	(Brazil) Roberto Miranda	352	154	1962–73
16.	(Brazil) Pampolini	347	27	1955–62
17.	(Brazil) Mendonça	340	116	1975–82
	* goalkeeper.			

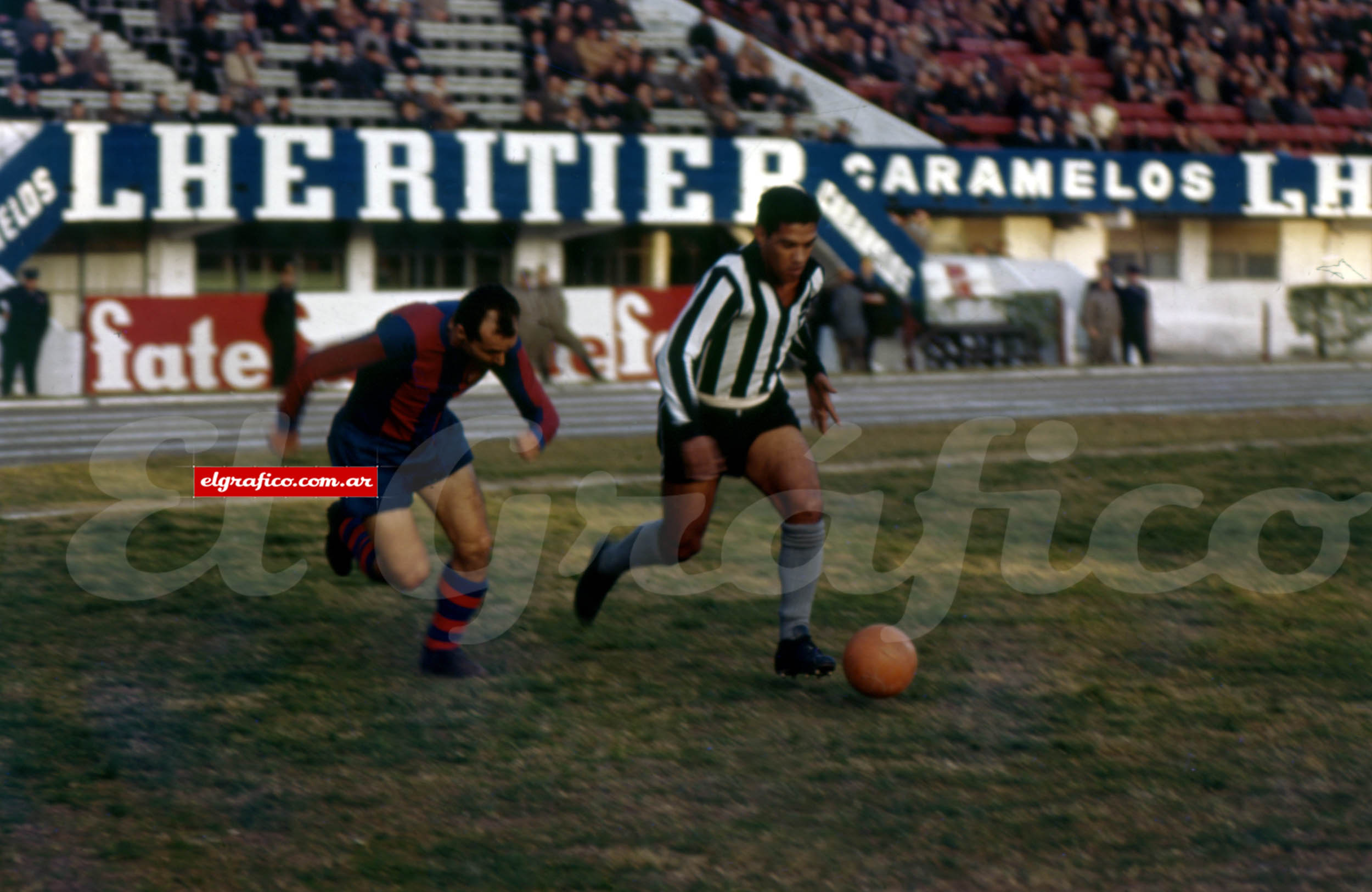
Garrincha playing for Botafogo in a 2–0 win against Barcelona in the 1964 Copa Iberoamericana at Buenos Aires.

Most goals
#	Name	Goals	Matches	G/M
1.	(Brazil) Quarentinha	306	444	0,68
2.	(Brazil) Carvalho Leite	261	303	0,86
3.	(Brazil) Garrincha	243	612	0,39
4.	(Brazil) Heleno de Freitas	209	235	0,88
5.	(Brazil) Nilo	190	201	0,94
6.	(Brazil) Jairzinho	186	413	0,45
7.	(Brazil) Octávio Moraes	171	200	0,85
8.	(Brazil) Túlio Maravilha	159	223	0,71
9.	(Brazil) Roberto Miranda	154	352	0,43
10.	(Brazil) (Italy) Dino da Costa	144	176	0,81
11.	(Brazil) Amarildo	136	231	0,58
12.	(Brazil) Paulinho Valentim	135	206	0,65
13.	(Brazil) Nílson Dias	127	301	0,42
14.	(Brazil) Mendonça	116	340	0,34
15.	(Brazil) Geninho	115	422	0,27
16.	(Brazil) Didi	114	313	0,36
17.	(Brazil) Zezinho	110	174	0,63
18.	(Brazil) Paschoal	105	158	0,66
19.	(Brazil) Patesko	102	242	0,42
20.	(Brazil) Gérson	96	248	0,39

- Note: numbers do not count matches played in Torneio Início.
- Source: RSSSF Brasil – Botafogo

== See also ==
- Botafogo FR (women)
- Botafogo de Futebol e Regatas (basketball)
