= 1964 Torneio Rio-São Paulo =

Torneio Rio-São Paulo
- Season: 1964
- Champions: Botafogo (2nd title); Santos (3rd title)
- Matches: 46
- Goals: 144 (3.13 per match)
- Top goalscorer: Coutinho (Santos) – 11 goals
- Biggest home win: Botafogo 5–0 Bangu (9 May)

The 1964 Torneio Rio São Paulo was the 17th edition of the Torneio Rio-São Paulo. It was disputed between 14 March 1964 to 10 January 1965.

== Participants ==
Team	City	Nº participations	Best result
Bangu	Rio de Janeiro	6	3rd (1951)
Botafogo	Rio de Janeiro	14	Champions: 1962
Corinthians	(São Paulo (state)) São Paulo	17	Champions: 1950, 1953, 1954
Flamengo	Rio de Janeiro	16	Champions: 1961
Fluminense	Rio de Janeiro	16	Champions: 1957, 1960
Palmeiras	(São Paulo (state)) São Paulo	17	Champions: 1933, 1951
Portuguesa	(São Paulo (state)) São Paulo	17	Champions: 1952, 1955
Santos	(São Paulo (state)) Santos	13	Champions: 1959, 1963
São Paulo	(São Paulo (state)) São Paulo	17	Runners-up: 1933, 1962
Vasco da Gama	Rio de Janeiro	17	Champions: 1958

== Format ==
The tournament were disputed in a single round-robin format, with the club with most points conquered being the champions.

== Tournament ==
Following is the summary of the 1964 Torneio Rio-São Paulo tournament:

Pos	Team	Pld	W	D	L	GF	GA	GD	Pts	Qualification
1	Botafogo	9	7	0	2	21	9	+12	14 (Note: Tied in points)	Tiebreaker playoff
2	(São Paulo (state)) Santos	9	7	0	2	21	12	+9	14	Tiebreaker playoff
3	(São Paulo (state)) Palmeiras	9	4	2	3	19	15	+4	10 (Note: Tied in points)	
4	Flamengo	9	3	4	2	12	11	+1	10	
5	Bangu	9	3	3	3	11	14	−3	9 (Note: Tied in points)	
6	(São Paulo (state)) Portuguesa	9	2	5	2	17	16	+1	9	
7	(São Paulo (state)) Corinthians	9	3	2	4	12	14	−2	8	
8	Vasco da Gama	9	2	3	4	10	14	−4	7	
9	Fluminense	9	0	5	4	8	13	−5	5	
10	(São Paulo (state)) São Paulo	9	1	2	6	8	21	−13	4	

Source: RSSSF

=== Tiebreaker playoff ===
10 January 1965

Botafogo	3–2	(São Paulo (state)) Santos
Jairzinho 20'; Roberto Miranda 40', 43'		Coutinho 49', 65'

Maracanã, Rio de Janeiro
Referee: Albino Zanferrari

As Botafogo and Santos finished tied in points, a three-legged tiebreaker was set to be played. Despite Botafogo going 3–0 up at half-time, Santos equalized the match; the third goal, initially confirmed by the referee Albino Zanferrari, was later ruled out after the referee was advised to do so by his assistant. Later on, Zanferrari sent off Paulistinha after understanding that the player was stalling after receiving a foul, and the match was only reinstated after policemen entered the field for a short period. As the match was due to restart, Pelé and Manga faced each other and were also sent off. Zanferrari then ended the match before the 90 minutes, shortly after Botafogo's last substitution.

Santos (São Paulo (state))	Canceled	Botafogo

There was no second game due to lack of dates. The clubs entered into an agreement to share the title.
