= 1957 Campeonato Carioca =

Campeonato Carioca
- Season: 1957
- Champions: Botafogo
- Matches played: 132
- Goals scored: 460 (3.48 per match)
- Top goalscorer: Paulo Valentim (Botafogo) – 22 goals
- Biggest home win: Bangu 7-1 Olaria (August 4, 1957); América 6-0 Olaria (September 21, 1957)
- Biggest away win: Madureira 0-8 Flamengo (September 15, 1957)
- Highest scoring: Madureira 6-3 Olaria (November 10, 1957)

The 1957 edition of the Campeonato Carioca kicked off on July 21, 1957 and ended on December 22, 1957. It was organized by FMF (Federação Metropolitana de Futebol, or Metropolitan Football Federation). Twelve teams participated. Botafogo won the title for the 10th time. no teams were relegated.

== System ==
The tournament would be disputed in a double round-robin format, with the team with the most points winning the title.

== Championship ==
| Pos | Team | Pld | W | D | L | GF | GA | GD | Pts | Qualification or relegation |
|---|---|---|---|---|---|---|---|---|---|---|
| 1 | Botafogo | 22 | 16 | 4 | 2 | 64 | 21 | +43 | 36 | Champions |
| 2 | Fluminense | 22 | 16 | 3 | 3 | 55 | 24 | +31 | 35 | |
| 3 | Flamengo | 22 | 14 | 6 | 2 | 60 | 23 | +37 | 34 | |
| 4 | Vasco da Gama | 22 | 15 | 3 | 4 | 51 | 28 | +23 | 33 | |
| 5 | Bangu | 22 | 12 | 5 | 5 | 41 | 22 | +19 | 29 | |
| 6 | América | 22 | 8 | 6 | 8 | 46 | 30 | +16 | 22 | |
| 7 | Canto do Rio | 22 | 8 | 3 | 11 | 26 | 38 | −12 | 19 | |
| 8 | São Cristóvão | 22 | 7 | 4 | 11 | 23 | 40 | −17 | 18 | |
| 9 | Portuguesa | 22 | 3 | 5 | 14 | 25 | 55 | −30 | 11 | |
| 10 | Madureira | 22 | 2 | 6 | 14 | 25 | 57 | −32 | 10 | |
| 11 | Bonsucesso | 22 | 1 | 7 | 14 | 18 | 51 | −33 | 9 | |
| 12 | Olaria | 22 | 2 | 4 | 16 | 22 | 67 | −45 | 8 | |

Updated to match(es) played on December 22, 1957. Source: RSSSF.com
Rules for classification: 1) points; 2) goal difference; 3) wins; 4) number of goals scored.
