= 1948 Campeonato Carioca =

Campeonato Carioca
- Season: 1948
- Champions: Botafogo
- Matches: 110
- Goals: 499 (4.54 per match)
- Top goalscorer: Orlando (Fluminense); Octávio (Botafogo) – 21 goals
- Biggest home win: Flamengo 7-0 Canto do Rio (August 15, 1948)
- Biggest away win: Olaria 2-8 Fluminense (August 22, 1948)
- Highest scoring: Bangu 8-3 Bonsucesso (November 21, 1948)

The 1948 edition of the Campeonato Carioca kicked off on July 11, 1948, and ended on December 12, 1948. It was organized by FMF (Federação Metropolitana de Futebol, or Metropolitan Football Federation). Eleven teams participated. Botafogo won the title for the 9th time. no teams were relegated.

== System ==
The tournament would be disputed in a double round-robin format, with the team with the most points winning the title.

== Torneio Municipal ==
Pos	Team	Pld	W	D	L	GF	GA	GD	Pts	Qualification or relegation
1	Fluminense	10	6	4	0	25	13	+12	16	Playoffs
2	Vasco da Gama	10	6	4	0	25	15	+10	16	Playoffs
3	Flamengo	10	7	1	2	30	12	+18	15	
4	Botafogo	10	4	4	2	23	21	+2	12	
5	Olaria	10	4	4	2	23	22	+1	12	
6	Bangu	10	4	2	4	16	13	+3	10	
7	São Cristóvão	10	4	2	4	24	25	−1	10	
8	América	10	3	1	6	27	27	0	7	
9	Madureira	10	2	1	7	15	30	−15	5	
10	Bonsucesso	10	1	3	6	14	23	−9	5	
11	Canto do Rio	10	1	0	9	19	40	−21	2	

Updated to match(es) played on June 20, 1948. Source: RSSSF.com
Rules for classification: 1) points; 2) goal difference; 3) wins; 4) number of goals scored.

=== Playoffs ===
24 June 1948 Final	Fluminense	4 – 0	Vasco da Gama	General Severiano, Rio de Janeiro
	Orlando Pingo de Ouro 46' 70'; Simões 80'; Rodrigues 89'			Attendance: 6,991; Referee: Mário Vianna

27 June 1948 Final	Vasco da Gama	2 – 1	Fluminense	Gávea, Rio de Janeiro
	Dimas 36'; Nestor 50'		Orlando Pingo de Ouro 60'	Attendance: 11,016; Referee: Alberto da Gama Malcher

30 June 1948 Final	Fluminense	1 – 0	Vasco da Gama	General Severiano, Rio de Janeiro
	Orlando Pingo de Ouro 8'			Attendance: 14,381; Referee: Carlos de Oliveira Montijo

== Championship ==
Pos	Team	Pld	W	D	L	GF	GA	GD	Pts	Qualification or relegation
1	Botafogo	20	17	2	1	59	24	+35	36	Champions
2	Vasco da Gama	20	17	0	3	62	26	+36	34	
3	Fluminense	20	12	4	4	62	32	+30	28	
4	Flamengo	20	13	2	5	59	36	+23	28	
5	Bangu	20	8	3	9	43	43	0	19	
6	América	20	7	2	11	31	39	−8	18 (Note: América won the points of a loss against São Cristóvão due to one of São Cristóvão's players being ineligible.)	
7	São Cristóvão	20	7	2	11	41	52	−11	14	
8	Canto do Rio	20	5	2	13	32	62	−30	12	
9	Bonsucesso	20	5	1	14	35	58	−23	11	
10	Olaria	20	5	1	14	46	76	−30	11	
11	Madureira	20	3	3	14	29	51	−22	9	

Updated to match(es) played on December 12, 1948. Source: RSSSF.com
Rules for classification: 1) points; 2) goal difference; 3) wins; 4) number of goals scored.
