= 1962 Torneio Rio-São Paulo =

Torneio Rio-São Paulo
- Season: 1962
- Champions: Botafogo (1st title)
- Matches played: 23
- Goals scored: 70 (3.04 per match)
- Top goalscorer: Amarildo (Botafogo) – 7 goals

The 1962 Torneio Rio São Paulo was the 15th edition of the Torneio Rio-São Paulo. It was disputed between 14 February to 17 March.

== Participants ==
Team	City	Nº participations	Best result
America	Rio de Janeiro	12	6th (1951)
Botafogo	Rio de Janeiro	12	Runners-up: 1960, 1961
Corinthians	(São Paulo (state)) São Paulo	15	Champions: 1950, 1953, 1954
Flamengo	Rio de Janeiro	14	Champions: 1961
Fluminense	Rio de Janeiro	14	Champions: 1957, 1960
Palmeiras	(São Paulo (state)) São Paulo	15	Champions: 1933, 1951
Portuguesa	(São Paulo (state)) São Paulo	15	Champions: 1952, 1955
São Paulo	(São Paulo (state)) São Paulo	15	Runners-up: 1933
Vasco da Gama	Rio de Janeiro	15	Champions: 1958

== Format ==
The tournament were disputed in a two stages. In the first, clubs were split in two groups: Group A, with the teams of Rio de Janeiro, and Group B, with the teams of São Paulo. The two clubs with the best performance in this each group were qualified to the final round.

== Tournament ==
Following is the summary of the 1962 Torneio Rio-São Paulo tournament:

=== First round ===
Group A

Pos	Team	Pld	W	D	L	GF	GA	GD	Pts	Qualification
1	Botafogo	4	3	0	1	11	5	+6	6	Qualified to final round
2	Flamengo	4	2	2	0	5	3	+2	6	Qualified to final round
3	America	4	2	1	1	5	4	+1	5	
4	Vasco da Gama	4	1	1	2	6	9	−3	3	
5	Fluminense	4	0	0	4	3	9	−6	0	

Source: RSSSF
Rules for classification: 1) points; 2) tiebreaker match; 3) wins; 4) goal difference; 5) goals for.

Group B

Pos	Team	Pld	W	D	L	GF	GA	GD	Pts	Qualification
1	(São Paulo (state)) Palmeiras	4	2	1	1	7	4	+3	5	Qualified to final round
2	(São Paulo (state)) São Paulo	4	1	3	0	6	5	+1	5	Qualified to final round
3	(São Paulo (state)) Corinthians	3	1	1	1	4	6	−2	3	
4	(São Paulo (state)) Portuguesa	3	0	1	2	5	7	−2	1	

Source: RSSSF
Rules for classification: 1) points; 2) tiebreaker match; 3) wins; 4) goal difference; 5) goals for.

Note: Palmeiras and São Paulo played an extra match to define the first place of the group. As the match ended in a 1–1, the next criteria was used (number of wins).

=== Final round ===
Pos	Team	Pld	W	D	L	GF	GA	GD	Pts
1	Botafogo (C)	3	3	0	0	6	2	+4	6
2	(São Paulo (state)) São Paulo	3	1	1	1	5	5	0	3
3	(São Paulo (state)) Palmeiras	3	1	0	2	5	5	0	2
4	Flamengo	3	0	1	2	2	6	−4	1

Source: RSSSF
Rules for classification: 1) points; 2) Tiebreaker match; 3) wins; 4) goal difference; 5) goals for.
(C) Champions

== Final standings ==
Pos	Team	Pld	W	D	L	GF	GA	GD	Pts
1	Botafogo (C)	7	6	0	1	17	7	+10	12
2	(São Paulo (state)) São Paulo	8	2	5	1	12	11	+1	9
3	(São Paulo (state)) Palmeiras	8	3	2	3	12	9	+3	8
4	Flamengo	7	2	3	2	7	9	−2	7
5	America	4	2	1	1	5	4	+1	5
6	(São Paulo (state)) Corinthians	3	1	1	1	4	6	−2	3
7	Vasco da Gama	4	1	1	2	6	9	−3	3
8	(São Paulo (state)) Portuguesa	3	0	1	2	5	7	−2	1
9	Fluminense	4	0	0	4	3	9	−6	0

Source: RSSSF
Rules for classification: 1) points; 2) tiebreaker match; 3) wins; 4) goal difference; 5) goals for.
(C) Champions
