= 1961 Campeonato Carioca =

Campeonato Carioca
- Season: 1961
- Champions: Botafogo
- Taça Brasil: Botafogo
- Matches played: 122
- Goals scored: 282 (2.31 per match)
- Top goalscorer: Amarildo (Botafogo) - 18 goals
- Biggest home win: América 4-0 São Cristóvão (August 9, 1961); Botafogo 4-0 São Cristóvão (August 20, 1961); Flamengo 5-1 Olaria (October 4, 1961); América 4-0 Flamengo (October 7, 1961); Botafogo 4-0 Vasco da Gama (November 19, 19761)
- Biggest away win: Madureira 0-4 Flamengo (August 6, 1961); Portuguesa 2-6 Vasco da Gama (August 10, 1961)
- Highest scoring: Portuguesa 2-6 Vasco da Gama (August 10, 1961)

The 1961 edition of the Campeonato Carioca kicked off on July 30, 1961 and ended on December 28, 1961. It was organized by FCF (Federação Carioca de Futebol, or Carioca Football Federation). Twelve teams participated. Botafogo won the title for the 11th time. no teams were relegated.

== System ==
The tournament would be divided in two stages:

- First round: The twelve teams all played against each other in a single round-robin format. The eight best teams qualified to the Second round.
- Second round: The remaining eight teams all played in a double round-robin format against each other. The team with the most points in the sum of both stages won the title.

== Championship ==
=== First round ===
Pos	Team	Pld	W	D	L	GF	GA	GD	Pts	Qualification or relegation
1	Botafogo	11	7	4	0	24	8	+16	18	Qualified
2	Vasco da Gama	11	5	4	2	16	7	+9	14	Qualified
3	Flamengo	11	6	2	3	22	13	+9	14	Qualified
4	Bangu	11	4	5	2	8	7	+1	13	Qualified
5	América	11	4	4	3	13	8	+5	12	Qualified
6	Olaria	11	5	2	4	10	10	0	12	Qualified
7	Fluminense	11	5	2	4	13	14	−1	12	Qualified
8	São Cristóvão	11	4	3	4	8	13	−5	11	Qualified
9	Portuguesa	11	4	2	5	14	15	−1	10	
10	Canto do Rio	11	3	3	5	7	13	−6	9	
11	Bonsucesso	11	2	2	7	7	19	−12	6	
12	Madureira	11	0	1	10	5	20	−15	1	

Updated to match(es) played on September 24, 1961. Source: RSSSF.com
Rules for classification: 1) points; 2) goal difference; 3) wins; 4) number of goals scored.

=== Second round ===
Pos	Team	Pld	W	D	L	GF	GA	GD	Pts
1	Botafogo	14	11	2	1	30	10	+20	24
2	Flamengo	14	6	4	4	21	16	+5	16
3	Fluminense	14	5	6	3	14	14	0	16
4	Vasco da Gama	14	7	2	5	18	19	−1	16
5	Bangu	14	6	3	5	18	13	+5	15
6	América	14	4	2	8	14	17	−3	10
7	Olaria	14	3	3	8	14	24	−10	9
8	São Cristóvão	14	1	4	9	6	22	−16	6

Updated to match(es) played on December 28, 1961. Source: RSSSF.com
Rules for classification: 1) points; 2) goal difference; 3) wins; 4) number of goals scored.

=== Final standings ===
Pos	Team	Pld	W	D	L	GF	GA	GD	Pts	Qualification or relegation
1	Botafogo	25	18	6	1	54	18	+36	42	Champions
2	Flamengo	25	12	6	7	43	29	+14	30	
3	Vasco da Gama	25	12	6	7	34	26	+8	30	
4	Fluminense	25	10	8	7	27	28	−1	28	
5	Bangu	25	10	8	7	26	20	+6	28	
6	América	25	8	6	11	27	25	+2	22	
7	Olaria	25	8	5	12	24	34	−10	21	
8	São Cristóvão	25	5	7	13	14	35	−21	17	
9	Portuguesa	11	4	2	5	14	15	−1	10	
10	Canto do Rio	11	3	3	5	7	13	−6	9	
11	Bonsucesso	11	2	2	7	7	19	−12	6	
12	Madureira	11	0	1	10	5	20	−15	1	

Updated to match(es) played on December 28, 1961. Source: RSSSF.com
Rules for classification: 1) points; 2) goal difference; 3) wins; 4) number of goals scored.
