= 1962 Campeonato Carioca =

Campeonato Carioca
- Season: 1962
- Champions: Botafogo
- Taça Brasil: Botafogo
- Matches: 156
- Goals: 437 (2.8 per match)
- Top goalscorer: Saulzinho (Vasco da Gama) - 18 goals
- Biggest home win: Flamengo 7-0 Canto do Rio (July 10, 1962); Vasco da Gama 7-0 Campo Grande (September 21, 1962)
- Biggest away win: Portuguesa 0-7 Fluminense (November 11, 1962)
- Highest scoring: Flamengo 7-0 Canto do Rio (July 10, 1962); Flamengo 5-2 América (July 20, 1962); Botafogo 5-2 São Cristóvão (September 2, 1962); Vasco da Gama 7-0 Campo Grande (September 21, 1962); Portuguesa 0-7 Fluminense (November 11, 1962); Madureira 1-6 Botafogo (November 14, 1962)

The 1962 edition of the Campeonato Carioca kicked off on June 30, 1962 and ended on December 16, 1962. It was organized by FCF (Federação Carioca de Futebol, or Carioca Football Federation). Thirteen teams participated. Botafogo won the title for the 12th time. no teams were relegated.

== System ==
The tournament would be disputed in a double round-robin format, with the team with the most points winning the title.

== Championship ==
| Pos | Team | Pld | W | D | L | GF | GA | GD | Pts | Qualification or relegation |
|---|---|---|---|---|---|---|---|---|---|---|
| 1 | Botafogo | 24 | 17 | 5 | 2 | 49 | 14 | +35 | 39 | Champions |
| 2 | Flamengo | 24 | 18 | 2 | 4 | 57 | 15 | +42 | 38 | |
| 3 | Fluminense | 24 | 17 | 2 | 5 | 47 | 15 | +32 | 36 | |
| 4 | Vasco da Gama | 24 | 15 | 5 | 4 | 51 | 19 | +32 | 35 | |
| 5 | Bangu | 24 | 12 | 6 | 6 | 37 | 25 | +12 | 30 | |
| 6 | Olaria | 24 | 10 | 7 | 7 | 36 | 24 | +12 | 27 | |
| 7 | América | 24 | 8 | 8 | 8 | 33 | 35 | −2 | 24 | |
| 8 | Bonsucesso | 24 | 9 | 3 | 12 | 32 | 45 | −13 | 21 | |
| 9 | Campo Grande | 24 | 5 | 7 | 12 | 28 | 48 | −20 | 17 | |
| 10 | São Cristóvão | 24 | 6 | 5 | 13 | 32 | 46 | −14 | 17 | |
| 11 | Portuguesa | 24 | 3 | 6 | 15 | 13 | 50 | −37 | 12 | |
| 12 | Madureira | 24 | 2 | 6 | 16 | 12 | 50 | −38 | 10 | |
| 13 | Canto do Rio | 24 | 0 | 6 | 18 | 10 | 53 | −43 | 6 | |

Updated to match(es) played on December 16, 1962. Source: RSSSF.com
Rules for classification: 1) points; 2) goal difference; 3) wins; 4) number of goals scored.
